= List of Ichneumonini genera =

These 357 genera belong to Ichneumonini, a tribe of ichneumon wasps in the family Ichneumonidae.

== Ichneumonini genera ==
- Acanthobenyllus Heinrich, 1938
- Achaius Cameron, 1903
- Achaiusoides Tereshkin, 2011
- Acolobus Wesmael, 1845
- Aculichneumon Heinrich, 1937
- Aculicoxa Gauld, 1984
- Adelotropis Waterston, 1921
- Aeneonaenaria Heinrich, 1974
- Aethiamblys Heinrich, 1967
- Aethianoplis Heinrich, 1969
- Aethioplites Heinrich, 1938
- Aethioplitops Heinrich, 1969
- Afrobystra Heinrich, 1969
- Afrocoelichneumon Heinrich, 1938
- Afrolongichneumon Heinrich, 1969
- Afromelanichneumon Heinrich, 1938
- Afromevesia Roman, 1924
- Afrotrogus Heinrich, 1938
- Aglaojoppa Cameron, 1901
- Algathia Cameron, 1902
- Allonotus Cameron, 1907
- Alystria Cameron, 1904
- Amblyaeneus Heinrich, 1965
- Amblyjoppa Cameron, 1902
- Amblysmenus Heinrich, 1975
- Amblyteles Wesmael, 1845
- Anisobas Wesmael, 1845
- Anisopygus Kriechbaumer, 1888
- Aoplus Tischbein, 1874
- Apatetor Saussure, 1890
- Apatetorides Heinrich, 1938
- Archboldiella Heinrich, 1934
- Atanyjoppa Cameron, 1901
- Auberteterus Diller, 1981
- Aucklandella Cameron, 1909
- Aulojoppa Cameron, 1907
- Auritus Constantineanu, 1969
- Bambuscopus Heinrich, 1934
- Baranisobas Heinrich, 1972
- Barichneumon Thomson, 1893
- Barichneumonites Heinrich, 1934
- Benyllus Cameron, 1903
- Bonthainiella Heinrich, 1934
- Bovijoppa Heinrich, 1965
- Bureschias Heinrich, 1936
- Bystra Cameron, 1902
- Callajoppa Cameron, 1903
- Calleupalamus Heinrich, 1938
- Carinodes Hancock, 1926
- Catadelphops Heinrich, 1962
- Catadelphus Wesmael, 1854
- Celebarches Heinrich, 1934
- Celebichneumon Heinrich, 1934
- Celebijoppa Heinrich, 1934
- Centeterichneumon Heinrich, 1938
- Ceratojoppa Cameron, 1905
- Cesandria Koçak, 2009
- Charmedia Wahl & Sime, 2002
- Chasmias Ashmead, 1900
- Chasmopygium Heinrich, 1967
- Chiaglas Cameron, 1902
- Clitiga Cameron, 1905
- Clypeocava Heinrich, 1934
- Clypeodromus Tereshkin, 1992
- Cnemojoppa Cameron, 1907
- Cobunus Uchida, 1926
- Coelapatetor Heinrich, 1967
- Coelichneumon Thomson, 1893
- Coelichneumonops Heinrich, 1958
- Coelojoppa Cameron, 1904
- Coeloleptops Heinrich, 1967
- Compsophorus Saussure, 1890
- Conocalama Hopper, 1939
- Conopyge Kreichbaumer, 1898
- Cornuprocerus Diller, 1981
- Cornutoplisus Heinrich, 1957
- Corymbichneumon Morley, 1919
- Cosmiojoppa Cameron, 1902
- Crathiorada Heinrich, 1965
- Cratichneumon Thomson, 1893
- Cratojoppa Cameron, 1901
- Crypteffigies Heinrich, 1961
- Cryptojoppa Kriechbaumer, 1898
- Cryptoplites Heinrich, 1938
- Crytea Cameron, 1906
- Ctenichneumon Thomson, 1894
- Ctenichneumonops Heinrich, 1968
- Ctenocalops Heinrich, 1967
- Ctenocalus Szépligeti, 1908
- Ctenochares Förster, 1869
- Cushmaniella Heinrich, 1934
- Daggoo Wahl & Sime, 2002
- Dammermaniella Heinrich, 1934
- Dammermaniellops Heinrich, 1974
- Darachosia Cameron, 1903
- Darymna Cameron, 1904
- Degithina Cameron, 1900
- Deniya Cameron, 1905
- Dentichasmias Heinrich, 1969
- Dentichasmiops Heinrich, 1969
- Denticrytea Heinrich, 1969
- Depressopyga Heinrich, 1969
- Deuterolabops Heinrich, 1975
- Deuterotypus Heinrich, 1930
- Diacantharius Schmiedeknecht, 1902
- Diaschisaspis Förster, 1869
- Diashisaspis
- Dicaelognathus Gokhman, 1990
- Dilleria Tereshkin, 1994
- Dilopharius Townes, 1966
- Dimaetha Cameron, 1901
- Diphyus Kriechbaumer, 1890
- Dothenia Wahl & Sime, 2002
- Eccoptosage Kriechbaumer, 1898
- Ectopimorpha Viereck, 1912
- Eleebichneumon Gauld, 1984
- Elysioreiga Heinrich, 1965
- Eristicus Wesmael, 1845
- Euheresiarches Heinrich, 1934
- Eupalamus Wesmael, 1845
- Eurydacus Townes, 1966
- Eutanyacra Cameron, 1903
- Evirchomella Heinrich, 1969
- Exephanes Wesmael, 1845
- Facydes Cameron, 1901
- Fileanta Cameron, 1901
- Foveosculum Heinrich, 1938
- Gareila Heinrich, 1980
- Gathetus Cameron, 1901
- Gavrana Cameron, 1906
- Genaemirum Heinrich, 1936
- Gibbobystra Heinrich, 1969
- Gibbosoplites
- Gnamptopelta Hopper, 1939
- Goedartia Boie, 1841
- Gyrodonta Cameron, 1901
- Gyrodontichneumon Heinrich, 1965
- Hedyjoppa Cameron, 1904
- Hemibystra Heinrich, 1969
- Hemibystrops Heinrich, 1969
- Hemihoplis Heinrich, 1960
- Hemiphaisura Heinrich, 1967
- Hepialichneumon Dong, Wang, Yang, Yang & Shen, 1993
- Hepiopelmus Wesmael, 1845
- Heresiarches Wesmael, 1859
- Hintelmannia Diller & Schonitzer, 1997
- Hiorada Cameron, 1902
- Holcichneumon Cameron, 1911
- Holcojoppa Cameron, 1902
- Holojoppa Szépligeti, 1900
- Homotherus Förster, 1869
- Hoplismenus Gravenhorst, 1829
- Humbert Wahl & Sime, 2002
- Hybophorellus Schultz, 1911
- Hymenura Townes, 1965
- Hytophatnus Cameron, 1907
- Ichneumon Linnæus, 1758
- Ileanta Cameron, 1899
- Ileantella Heinrich, 1968
- Imeria R. M. King & H. Rob.
- Ischnojoppa Kriechbaumer, 1898
- Jacotitypus Heinrich, 1967
- Joppa Fabricius, 1804
- Joppocryptus Viereck, 1913
- Lachmetha Cameron, 1903
- Laderrica Wahl & Sime, 2002
- Lagavula Wahl & Sime, 2002
- Lareiga Cameron, 1903
- Larischia Heinrich, 1969
- Legnatia Cameron, 1903
- Leptojoppa Cameron, 1901
- Leptomalaisia Heinrich, 1965
- Leptophatnus Cameron, 1906
- Leptops Schoenherr, C.J., 1834
- Leptotogea Heinrich, 1969
- Liaodontus Diller, 1994
- Lichmeres Townes, 1946
- Limerodes Wesmael, 1845
- Limerodops Heinrich, 1949
- Limonethe Townes, 1946
- Liojoppa Szépligeti, 1908
- Liojoppites Heinrich, 1967
- Lissolongichneumon Heinrich, 1969
- Lissophadnus Cameron, 1907
- Lissosculpta Heinrich, 1934
- Listrodromus Wesmael, 1845
- Lobaegis Townes, 1946
- Londokia
- Longichneumon Heinrich, 1934
- Lophojoppa Brèthes, 1927
- Losgna Cameron, 1903
- Luteocoelius Heinrich, 1968
- Lymantrichneumon Heinrich, 1968
- Lynteria Cameron, 1904
- Macrojoppa Kriechbaumer, 1898
- Madagasgavrana Heinrich, 1938
- Madagasichneumon Heinrich, 1938
- Magwengiella Bachmaier & Diller, 1985
- Malaisichneumon Heinrich, 1965
- Maraces Cameron, 1902
- Marlisia Heinrich, 1975
- Matara Holmgren, 1868
- Matinangarches Heinrich, 1934
- Megajoppa Szépligeti, 1900
- Melanichneumon Thomson, 1893
- Menkokia Heinrich, 1934
- Merolides Brèthes, 1909
- Mesophadnus Cameron, 1907
- Metallichneumon Wahl & Sime, 2002
- Micrandria Heinrich, 1934
- Microlongichneumon Heinrich, 1969
- Microsage Kriechbaumer, 1898
- Mokajoppa Wahl & Sime, 2002
- Monodontichneumon Heinrich, 1969
- Monontos Uchida, 1926
- Myocious Wahl & Sime, 2002
- Naenaria Cameron, 1903
- Naenarides Heinrich, 1969
- Naenarosculum Heinrich, 1968
- Narthecura Townes, 1946
- Neamblyaeneus Heinrich, 1965
- Neamblymorpha Heinrich, 1960
- Neischnus Heinrich, 1952
- Neocratojoppa Heinrich, 1969
- Neodiphyus Heinrich, 1977
- Neofacydes Heinrich, 1960
- Neoheresiarches Uchida, 1937
- Neolareiga Heinrich, 1980
- Neotypus Förster, 1869
- Nesostenodontus Cushman, 1922
- Netanyacra Heinrich, 1968
- Nonpropodeum Heinrich, 1934
- Notacma Townes, 1946
- Obtusodonta Heinrich, 1962
- Odontojoppa Cameron, 1903
- Oedicephalus Cresson, 1868
- Oezdemirus Özdikmen & Turgut, 2006
- Ogulnia Cameron, 1904
- Oreohoplis Townes, 1966
- Orgichneumon Heinrich, 1961
- Oriphatnus Heinrich, 1967
- Orotylus Holmgren, 1890
- Ortezia Cresson, 1873
- Paracoelichneumon Heinrich, 1978
- Paraditremops Heinrich, 1977
- Paraethecerus Bruch, 1926
- Parvaoplus Heinrich, 1969
- Patrocloides Heinrich, 1961
- Patroclus Cresson, 1873
- Pectinorex Graf, 1976
- Pedinopelte Kriechbaumer, 1898
- Pentelophus Townes, 1966
- Pepsijoppa Heinrich, 1936
- Phaeneumon Gauld, 1984
- Phaisura Cameron, 1906
- Phaisurella Heinrich, 1938
- Phaisurellops Heinrich, 1967
- Pithotomus Kriechbaumer, 1888
- Plagiotrypes Ashmead, 1900
- Platyjoppa Uchida, 1932
- Platylabops Heinrich, 1950
- Poecilodromops Heinrich, 1975
- Poecilodromus Heinrich, 1975
- Poecilojoppa Kriechbaumer, 1898
- Poecilojoppoides Heinrich, 1934
- Procerochasmias Heinrich, 1938
- Projoppa Townes, 1936
- Protichneumon Thomson, 1893
- Protoleptops Heinrich, 1967
- Protopelmus Heinrich, 1959
- Provancherides Heinrich, 1968
- Pseudalomya Telenga, 1930
- Pseudeupalamus Heinrich, 1980
- Pseudevirchoma Heinrich, 1969
- Pseudischnojoppa Heinrich, 1967
- Pseudoamblyteles Heinrich, 1926
- Pseudocillimops Heinrich, 1969
- Pseudocillimus Roman, 1920
- Pseudocoelichneumon Heinrich, 1967
- Pseudomaraces Heinrich, 1975
- Pseudoplatylabops Heinrich, 1967
- Pseudoplatylabus Smits van Burgst, 1920
- Pseudotogea Heinrich, 1969
- Psilomastax Tischbein, 1868
- Punctileptops Heinrich, 1967
- Pyramidamblys Heinrich, 1967
- Quandrus Wahl & Sime, 2002
- Queequeg Wahl & Sime, 2002
- Raninia Diller, 1985
- Rhadinodonta Szépligeti, 1908
- Rhadinodontoplisus Heinrich, 1938
- Rhadinodontops Heinrich, 1969
- Rhysaspis Tischbein, 1874
- Rictichneumon Heinrich, 1961
- Rimbusia Heinrich, 1980
- Rubicundiella Heinrich, 1961
- Rugosculpta Heinrich, 1968
- Saltagenes Diller, 1995
- Saranaca Wahl & Sime, 2002
- Satrius Tosquinet, 1903
- Semitogea Heinrich, 1969
- Serratosculum Heinrich, 1969
- Setanta Cameron, 1901
- Setantops Heinrich, 1969
- Seyrighoplites Heinrich, 1938
- Seyrigichneumon Heinrich, 1938
- Seyrigiella Heinrich, 1938
- Solitosculum Heinrich, 1968
- Spilichneumon Thomson, 1894
- Spilothyrateles Heinrich, 1967
- Spinallonotus Heinrich, 1967
- Spinamblys Heinrich, 1969
- Spinellamblys Heinrich, 1969
- Stenaoplus Heinrich, 1938
- Stenapatetor Heinrich, 1938
- Stenarches Heinrich, 1934
- Stenarchops Heinrich, 1968
- Stenichneumon Thomson, 1893
- Stenichneumonopsis Heinrich, 1934
- Stenobarichneumon Heinrich, 1961
- Stenobenyllus Heinrich, 1938
- Stenogynaia Heinrich, 1965
- Stenolonche Kriechbaumer, 1898
- Stirexephanes Cameron, 1912
- Stirojoppa Cameron, 1911
- Sycaonia Cameron, 1903
- Syspasis Townes, 1965
- Tashtego Wahl & Sime, 2002
- Tetragonochora Kriechbaumer, 1898
- Thascia Cameron, 1904
- Thaumatocephalus Heinrich, 1930
- Thaumatoplites Heinrich, 1969
- Thaumatoplitops Heinrich, 1969
- Thymebatis Brèthes, 1909
- Thyrateles Perkins, 1953
- Thyridoplites Heinrich, 1969
- Tmetogaster Hopper, 1939
- Togea Uchida, 1926
- Togeella Heinrich, 1980
- Torquaoplus Heinrich, 1969
- Tricholabus Thomson, 1894
- Tricyphus Kriechbaumer, 1898
- Triptognathops Heinrich, 1978
- Triptognathus Berthoumieu, 1904
- Trogichneumon Heinrich, 1968
- Trogomorpha Ashmead, 1900
- Trogopyga Heinrich, 1969
- Trogus Panzer, 1806
- Ulesta Cameron, 1903
- Uloola Gauld, 1984
- Validentia Heinrich, 1934
- Virgichneumon Heinrich, 1977
- Vulgichneumon Heinrich, 1961
- Xanthosomnium Wahl & Sime, 2002
- Xestojoppa Cameron, 1901
- Yeppoona Gauld, 1984
- Zanthojoppa Cameron, 1901
