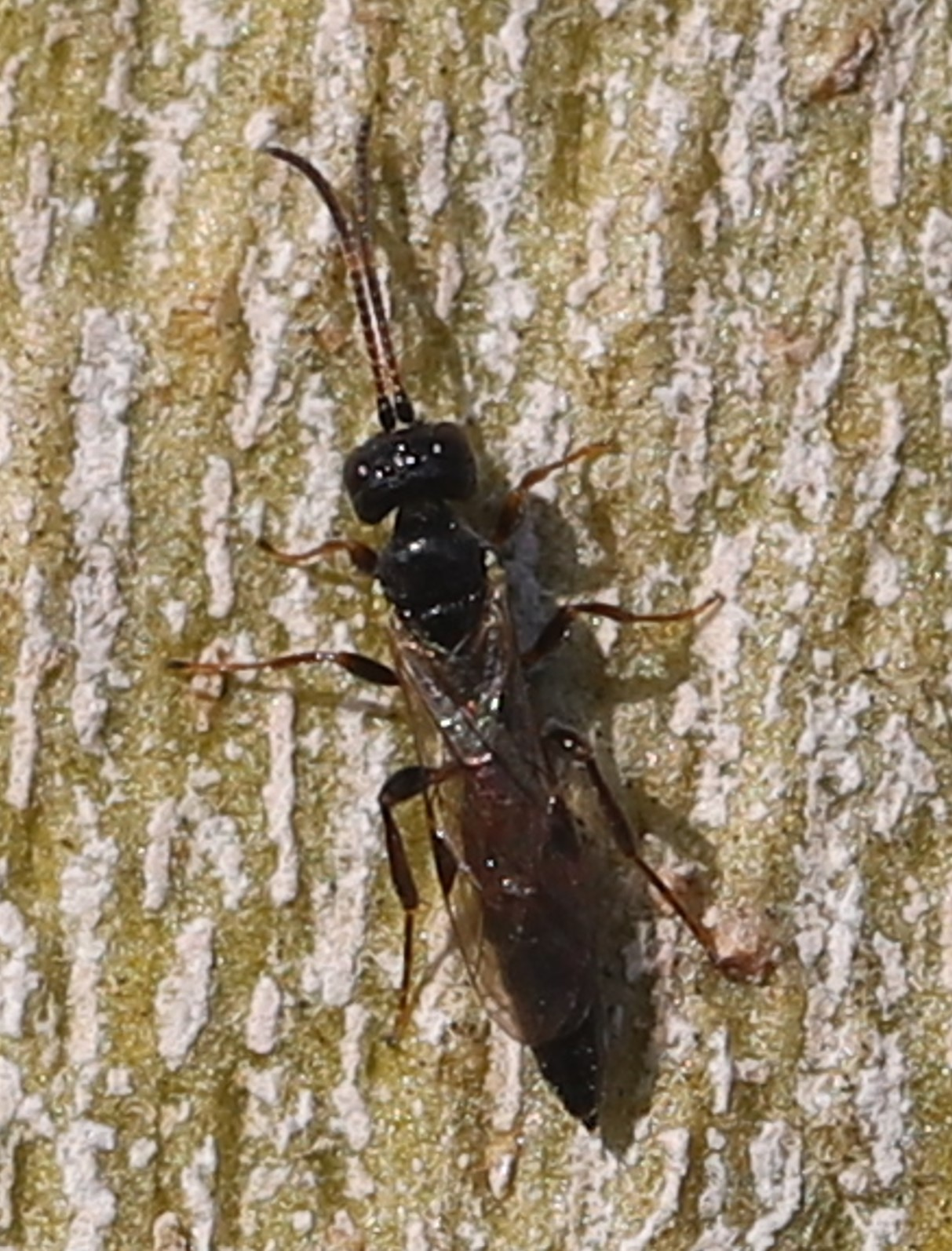
- Tycherus brunneus photographed in Walldorf, Germany

Scientific classification
- Domain: Eukaryota
- Kingdom: Animalia
- Phylum: Arthropoda
- Class: Insecta
- Order: Hymenoptera
- Family: Ichneumonidae
- Subfamily: Ichneumoninae
- Tribe: Phaeogenini; Förster, 1869

= Phaeogenini =

Tribe of wasps

Phaeogenini is a tribe of ichneumon wasps in the family Ichneumonidae.

== Genera ==
These 34 genera belong to the tribe Phaeogenini:

- Aethecerus Wesmael, 1845
- Akymichneumon Gauld, 1984
- Arearia Seyrig, 1952
- Baeosemus Förster, 1869
- Centeterus Wesmael, 1845
- Chauvinia Heinrich, 1938
- Colpognathus Wesmael, 1845
- Diadromus Wesmael, 1845
- Dicaelodontus Diller, 1994
- Dicaelotus Wesmael, 1845
- Dilleritomus Aubert, 1979
- Dirophanes Förster, 1869
- Eparces Förster, 1869
- Epitomus Förster, 1869
- Eriplatys Förster, 1869
- Hemichneumon Wesmael, 1857
- Herpestomus Wesmael, 1845
- Heterischnus Wesmael, 1859
- Hoplophaeogenes Heinrich, 1938
- Jethsura Cameron, 1902
- Kibalus Rousse, van Noort & Diller, 2013
- Lusius Tosquinet, 1903
- Maxodontus Diller, 1994
- Mevesia Holmgren, 1890
- Misetus Wesmael, 1845
- Nematomicrus Wesmael, 1845
- Oiorhinus Wesmael, 1845
- Oronotus Wesmael, 1845
- Phaeogenes Wesmael, 1845
- Phairichneumon Gauld, 1984
- Stenodontus Chen & Gong 1986
- Terebraella Heinrich, 1972
- Trachyarus Thomson, 1891
- Tycherus Förster, 1869
