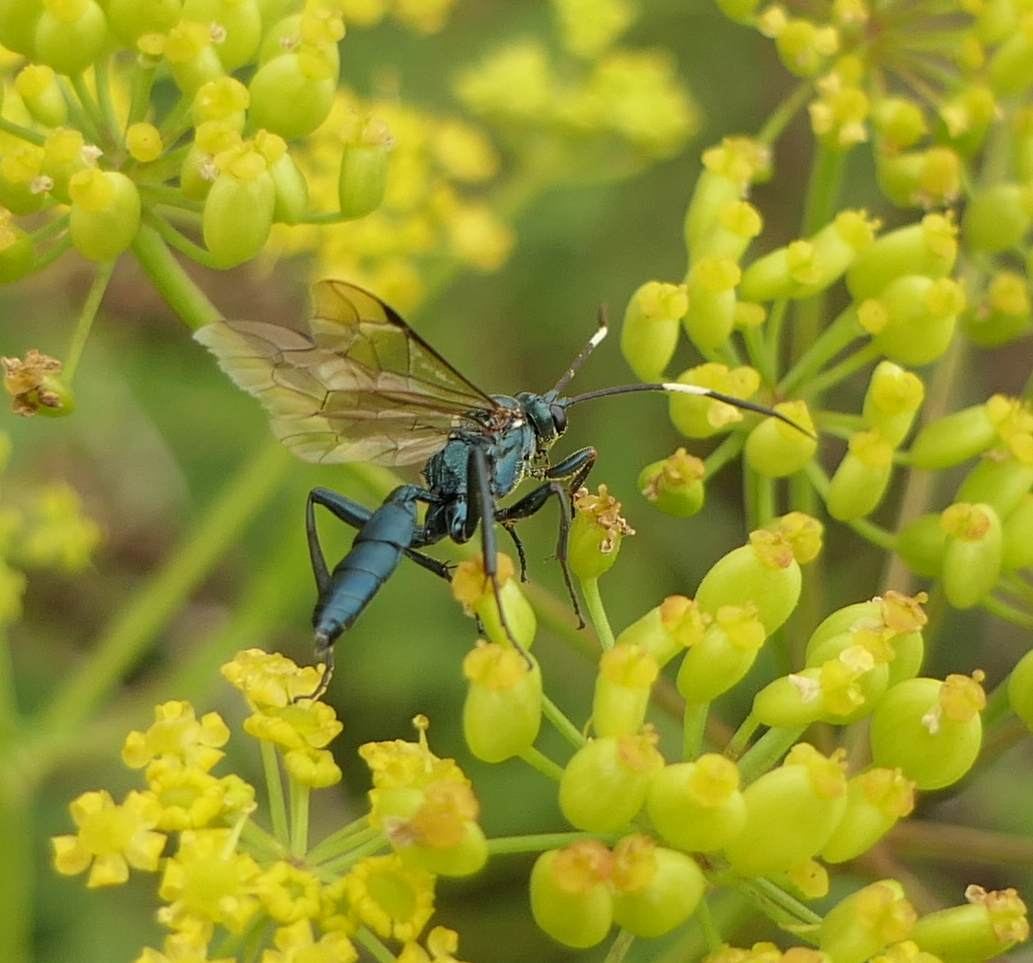
- Platylabus clarus, Canada

Scientific classification
- Domain: Eukaryota
- Kingdom: Animalia
- Phylum: Arthropoda
- Class: Insecta
- Order: Hymenoptera
- Family: Ichneumonidae
- Subfamily: Ichneumoninae
- Tribe: Platylabini; Berthoumieu

= Platylabini =

Tribe of wasps

Platylabini is a tribe of ichneumon wasps in the family Ichneumonidae. There are at least 40 genera and about 8 described species in Platylabini.

== Genera ==
These 40 genera belong to the tribe Platylabini:

- Acantholabus Heinrich, 1974
- Afrectopius Heinrich, 1936
- Ambloplisus Heinrich, 1930
- Apaeleticus Wesmael, 1845
- Asthenolabus Heinrich, 1951
- Carlsonia Heinrich, 1973
- Clypeolabus Heinrich, 1974
- Cotiheresiarches Telenga, 1929
- Cratolaboides Tereshkin, 2009
- Cratolabus Heinrich, 1974
- Cyclolabellus Heinrich, 1974
- Cyclolabus Heinrich, 1936
- Dentilabus Heinrich, 1974
- Ectopius Wesmael, 1859
- Ectopoides Heinrich, 1951
- Heinrichiellus Tereshkin, 2009
- Hirtolabus Heinrich, 1974
- Hoploplatystylus Schmiedeknecht, 1912
- Hypomecus Wesmael, 1845
- Lamprojoppa Cameron, 1901
- Levansa Townes, 1961
- Linycus Cameron, 1903
- Lissolaboides Heinrich, 1974
- Neeurylabia Heinrich, 1967
- Neolevansa Gauld, 1984
- Neolinycus Heinrich, 1971
- Notoplatylabus Heinrich, 1936
- Pachyjoppa Cameron, 1901
- Pagarenes Cameron, 1903
- Platybirmania Heinrich, 1974
- Platylabus Wesmael, 1845
- Platymischos Tischbein, 1868
- Poecilostictus Ratzeburg, 1852
- Pristicerops Heinrich, 1961
- Pristiceros Gravenhorst, 1829
- Probolus Wesmael, 1845
- Pyramidophorus Tischbein, 1882
- Rhyssolabus
- Spanophatnus Cameron, 1905
- Tropicolabus Heinrich, 1959
