= Alomyini =

Scientific classification
- Domain: Eukaryota
- Kingdom: Animalia
- Phylum: Arthropoda
- Class: Insecta
- Order: Hymenoptera
- Family: Ichneumonidae
- Subfamily: Ichneumoninae
- Tribe: Alomyini; Förster

Tribe of wasps

Alomyini is a tribe of ichneumon wasps in the family Ichneumonidae. There are two genera in Alomyini.

== Genera ==
These two genera belong to the tribe Alomyini:

- Alomya Panzer, 1806
- Megalomya Uchida, 1940
