= Heterolabis =

Heterolabis may refer to:

- Heterolabis Kriechbaumer, a junior synonym of the ichneumonid wasp genus Homotherus
- Heterolabis Borelli, a homonym of the preceding name and synonym of the earwig genus Euborellia
