= Menkokia blandii =

Scientific classification
- Kingdom: Animalia
- Phylum: Arthropoda
- Class: Insecta
- Order: Hymenoptera
- Family: Ichneumonidae
- Genus: Menkokia
- Species: M. blandii

Binomial name
- Menkokia blandii (Cresson, 1864)

Species of wasp

Menkokia blandii is a species of ichneumon wasp in the family Ichneumonidae.
