= Capitojoppa =

Scientific classification
- Kingdom: Animalia
- Phylum: Arthropoda
- Class: Insecta
- Order: Hymenoptera
- Family: Ichneumonidae
- Genus: Capitojoppa
- Species: C. amazonica

Binomial name
- Capitojoppa amazonica Claridge, Kaunisto & Sääksjärvi, 2023

Species of wasp

Capitojoppa is a monotypic genus of parasitoid wasp described in 2023. Its sole species is Capitojoppa amazonica. It belongs to the subfamily Ichneumoninae within the family Ichneumonidae.
