= Eurylabus =

Scientific classification
- Domain: Eukaryota
- Kingdom: Animalia
- Phylum: Arthropoda
- Class: Insecta
- Order: Hymenoptera
- Family: Ichneumonidae
- Subfamily: Ichneumoninae
- Tribe: Eurylabini
- Genus: Eurylabus; Wesmael, 1845

Genus of wasps

Eurylabus is a genus of ichneumon wasps in the family Ichneumonidae. There are about 11 described species in Eurylabus.

== Species ==
These 11 species belong to the genus Eurylabus:

- Eurylabus charlottae Heinrich, 1974
- Eurylabus dholadharensis Gupta, 1955
- Eurylabus indolarvatus Heinrich, 1974
- Eurylabus kiashii Uchida, 1956
- Eurylabus larvatus (Christ, 1791) (Europe)
- Eurylabus malaisei Heinrich, 1974
- Eurylabus nakayai Uchida, 1956
- Eurylabus quadratus Uchida, 1926
- Eurylabus torvus Wesmael, 1845 (Europe)
- Eurylabus tristis (Gravenhorst, 1829) (Europe)
- Eurylabus victoriae Heinrich, 1974 (temperate Asia)
