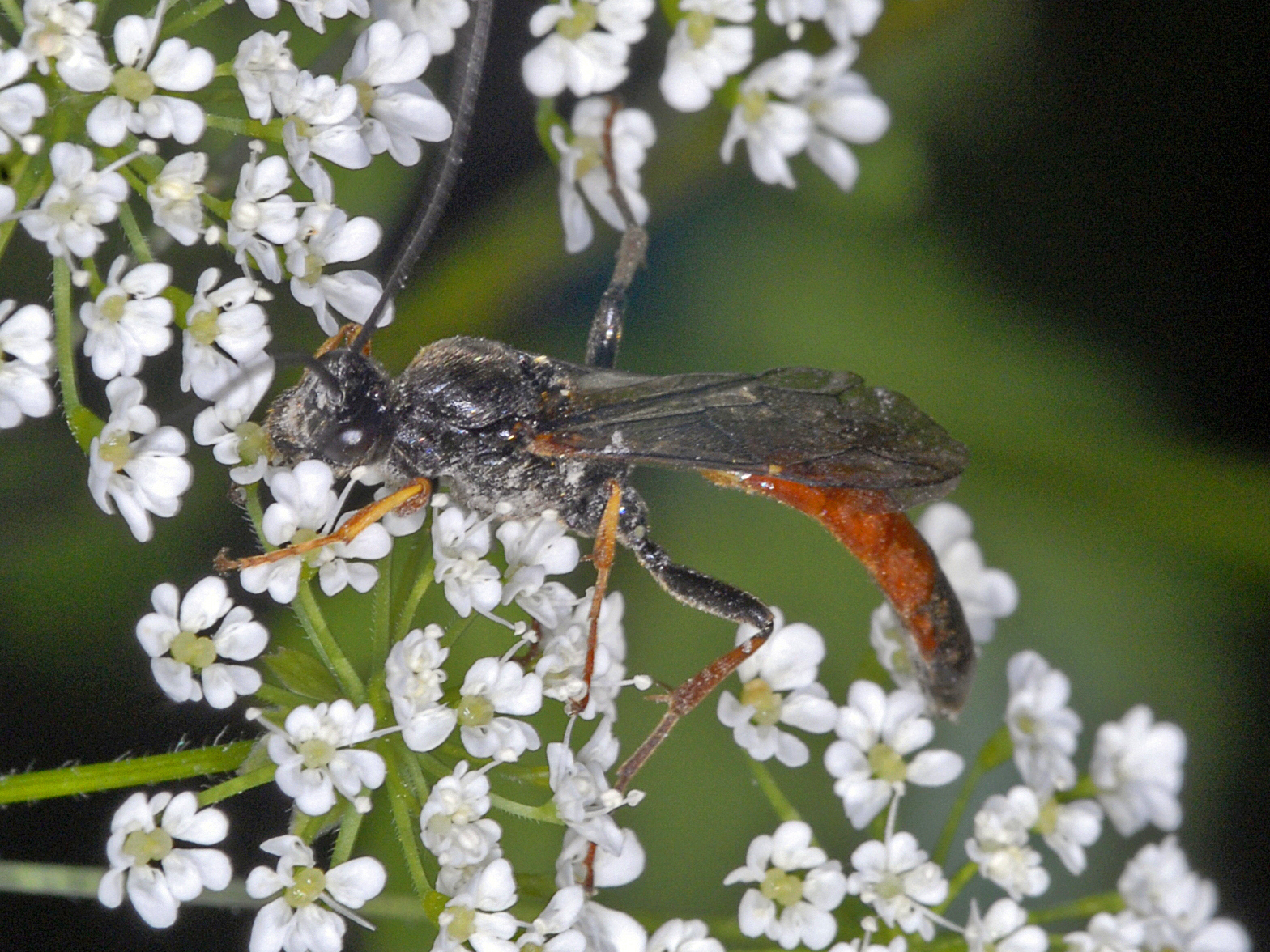
- Alomya cf. debellator

Scientific classification
- Kingdom: Animalia
- Phylum: Arthropoda
- Clade: Pancrustacea
- Class: Insecta
- Order: Hymenoptera
- Family: Ichneumonidae
- Subfamily: Ichneumoninae
- Genus: Alomya; Panzer, 1806

Synonyms
- Halomya Billberg, 1820

= Alomya =

Genus of wasps

Alomya is a genus of the parasitic wasp in the family Ichneumonidae.

== Species ==
- Alomya cheni He & Chen, 1990
- Alomya debellator (Fabricius, 1775)
- Alomya japonica Uchida, 1929
- Alomya punctulata (Schellenberg, 1802)
- Alomya pygmaea Heinrich
- Alomya semiflava Stephens, 1835
- Alomya telenga Abdinbekova, 1961
