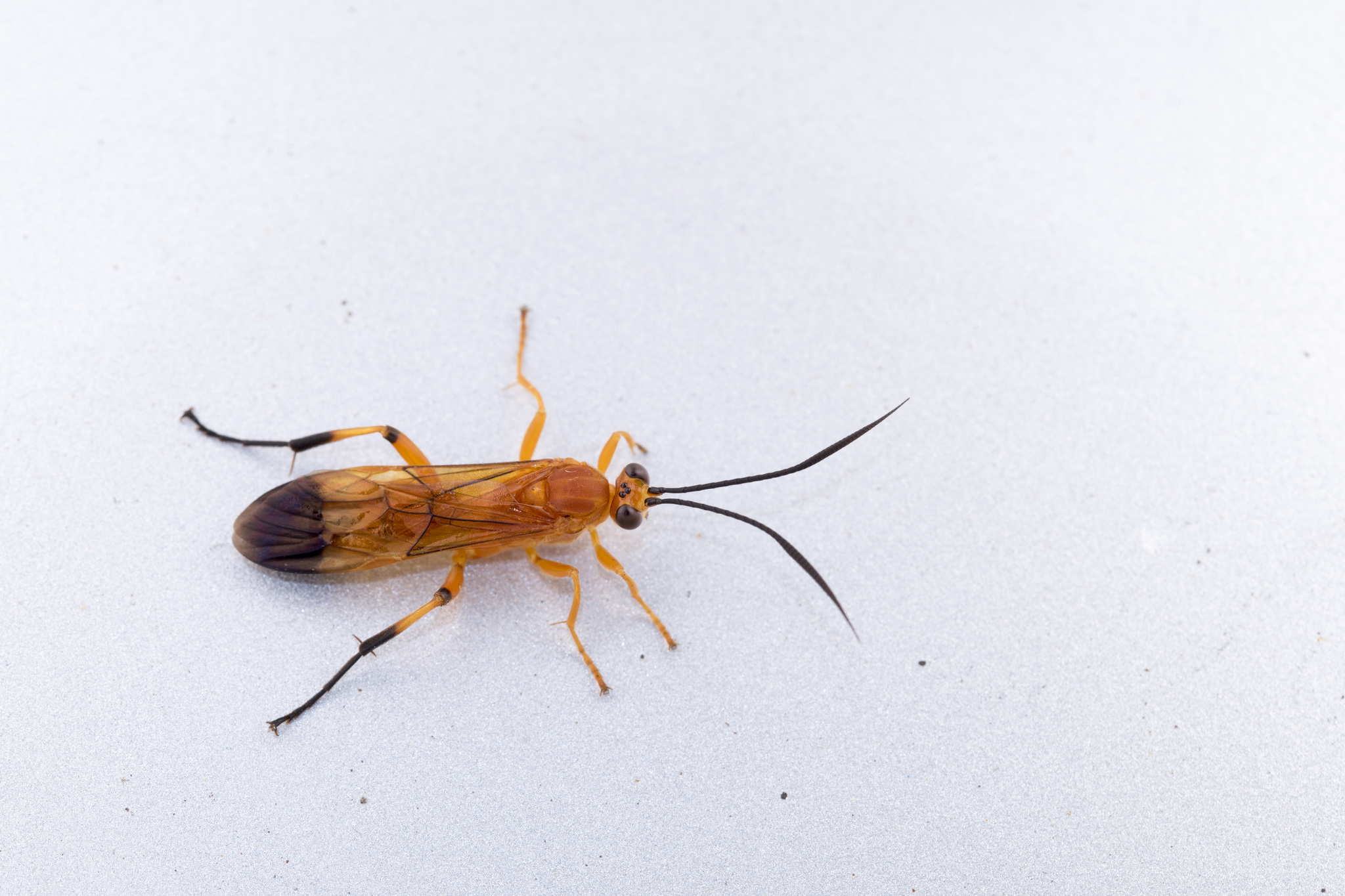
- Dimaetha tibialis

Scientific classification
- Kingdom: Animalia
- Phylum: Arthropoda
- Clade: Pancrustacea
- Class: Insecta
- Order: Hymenoptera
- Family: Ichneumonidae
- Subfamily: Ichneumoninae
- Tribe: Ichneumonini
- Genus: Dimaetha; Cameron, 1901

= Dimaetha =

Genus of wasps

Dimaetha is a genus of wasps belonging to the family Ichneumonidae. They are found in Taiwan.

== Taxonomy ==
Dimaetha contains the following species:

- Dimaetha tibialis
