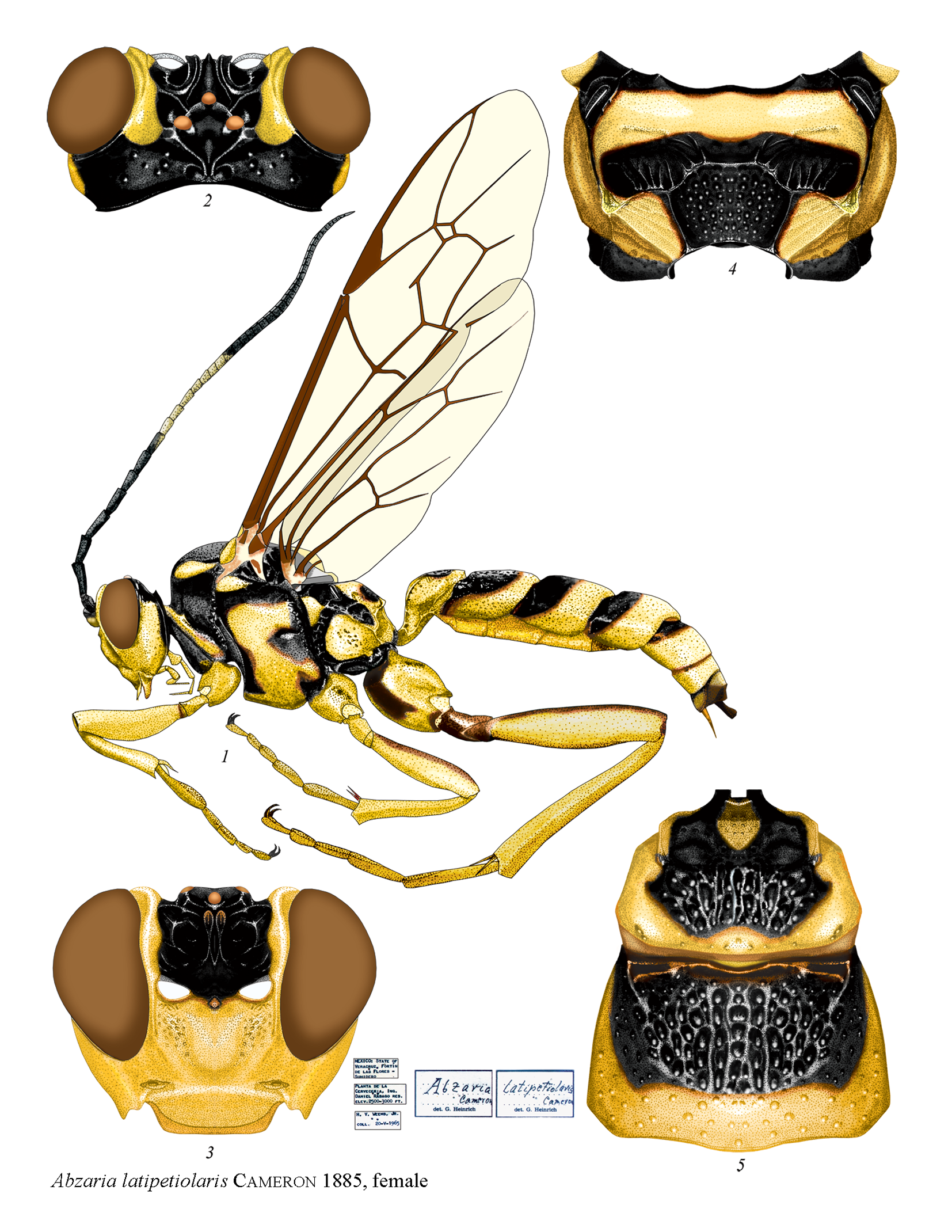

Scientific classification
- Kingdom: Animalia
- Phylum: Arthropoda
- Clade: Pancrustacea
- Class: Insecta
- Order: Hymenoptera
- Family: Ichneumonidae
- Subfamily: Ichneumoninae
- Tribe: Abzariini
- Genus: Abzaria; Cameron, 1885

= Abzaria =

Genus of wasps

Abzaria is a genus of ichneumon wasps in the family Ichneumonidae. There are at least two described species in Abzaria.

== Species ==
These two species belong to the genus Abzaria:

- Abzaria latipetiolaris Cameron, 1885
- Abzaria petiolaris
