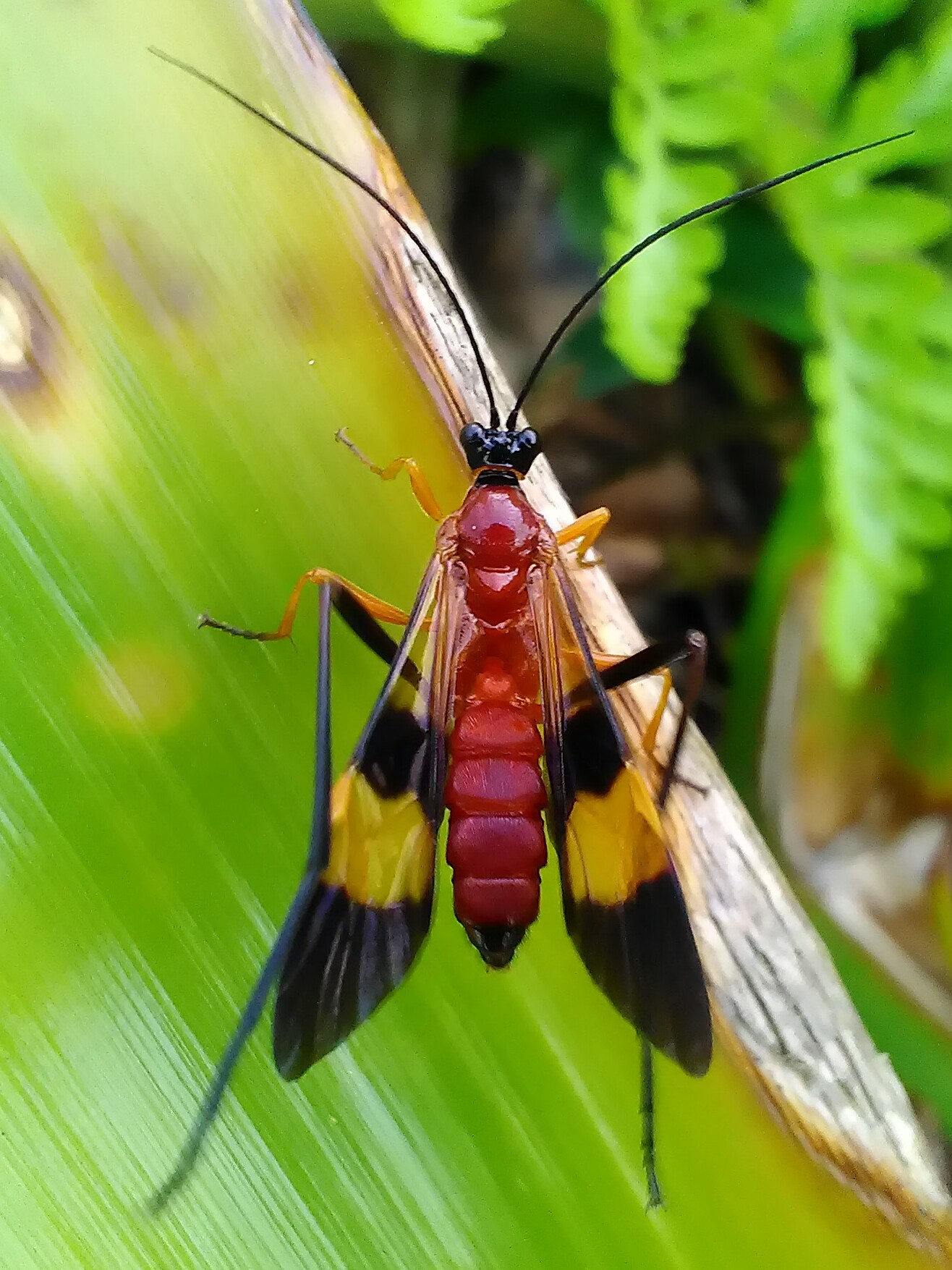
- Macrojoppa sp. photographed in Serra do Guararu, Brazil

Scientific classification
- Domain: Eukaryota
- Kingdom: Animalia
- Phylum: Arthropoda
- Class: Insecta
- Order: Hymenoptera
- Family: Ichneumonidae
- Subfamily: Ichneumoninae
- Tribe: Ichneumonini
- Genus: Macrojoppa; Kriechbaumer, 1898

= Macrojoppa =

Genus of insects

Macrojoppa is a genus of Ichneumonidae wasp.

== Description ==
They are parasites of Papilionidae and Nymphalidae

== Taxonomy ==
Macrojoppa contains 46 described species, including the following:

- Macrojoppa blandita
- Macrojoppa bogatensis
- Macrojoppa concinna
- Macrojoppa fascipennis
- Macrojoppa inclyta
- Macrojoppa violacea
- Macrojoppa picta
- Macrojoppa polysticta
- Macrojoppa pulcherrima
- Macrojoppa scutellaris
- Macrojoppa stapedifera
- Macrojoppa subbifasciata
- Macrojoppa rufa
