= Dirophanes =

Scientific classification
- Kingdom: Animalia
- Phylum: Arthropoda
- Class: Insecta
- Order: Hymenoptera
- Family: Ichneumonidae
- Genus: Dirophanes; Förster, 1869

Genus of insects

Dirophanes is a genus of parasitoid wasps belonging to the family Ichneumonidae.

The species of this genus are found in Europe and Northern America.

Species:

- Dirophanes anoukae Hower, 2006
- Dirophanes benjamini Hower, 2006
