= Zanthojoppa =

Scientific classification
- Domain: Eukaryota
- Kingdom: Animalia
- Phylum: Arthropoda
- Class: Insecta
- Order: Hymenoptera
- Family: Ichneumonidae
- Genus: Zanthojoppa; Cameron, 1901

Genus of parasitoid wasps

Zanthojoppa is a genus of parasitoid wasps belonging to the family Ichneumonidae.

The species of this genus are found in Europe.

Species:

- Zanthojoppa lutea (Gravenhorst, 1829)
- Zanthojoppa popae Heinrich, 1975
