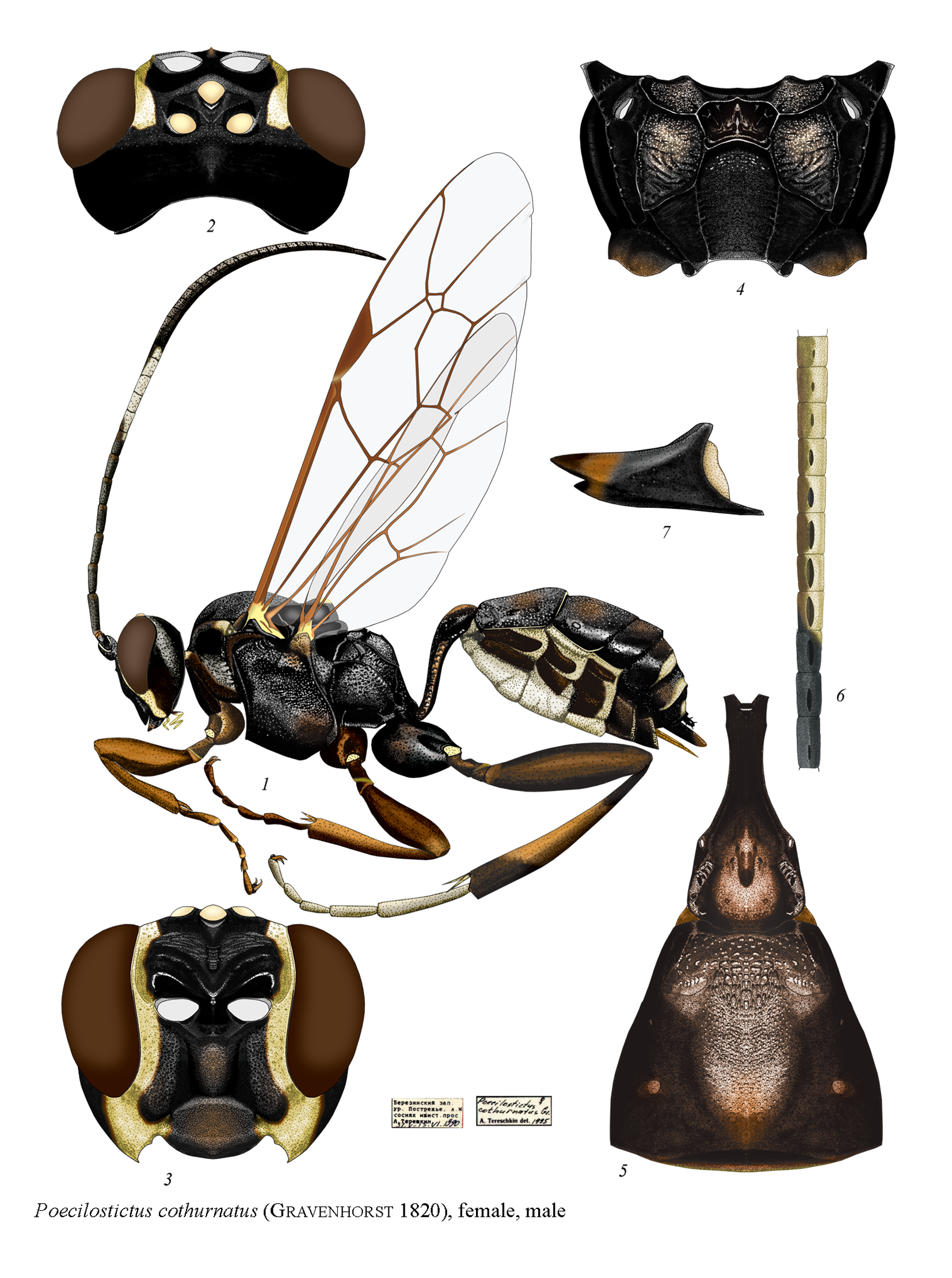
- Poecilostictus cothurnatus

Scientific classification
- Kingdom: Animalia
- Phylum: Arthropoda
- Class: Insecta
- Order: Hymenoptera
- Family: Ichneumonidae
- Genus: Poecilostictus; Ratzeburg, 1852

Synonyms
- Idiostolis Förster, 1869; Neoplatylabus Heinrich, 1936; Poecilostichus Ashmead, 1900

= Poecilostictus =

Genus of insects

Poecilostictus is a genus of parasitoid wasps belonging to the family Ichneumonidae.

The species of this genus are found in Europe.

Species:

- Poecilostictus cothurnatus (Gravenhorst, 1829)
- Poecilostictus decoratus Heinrich, 1974
