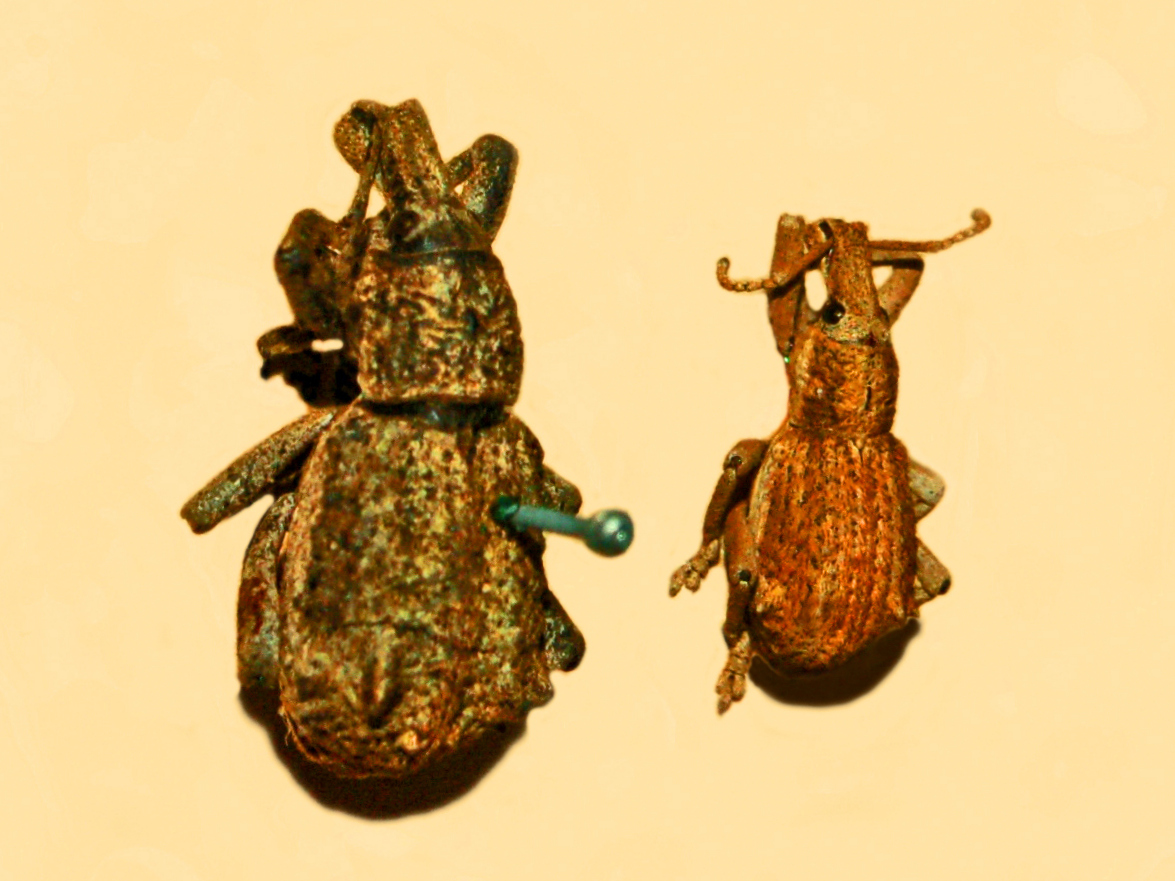
- Leptops iliaca from Australia. Mounted specimen on display at the Museo Civico di Storia Naturale di Genova

Scientific classification
- Kingdom: Animalia
- Phylum: Arthropoda
- Class: Insecta
- Order: Coleoptera
- Suborder: Polyphaga
- Infraorder: Cucujiformia
- Family: Curculionidae
- Genus: Leptops; Schonherr, 1834

= Leptops =

Genus of beetles

Leptops is a genus of weevils belonging the family Curculionidae.

== Species ==
- Leptops iliaca (Francis Polkinghorne Pascoe)
