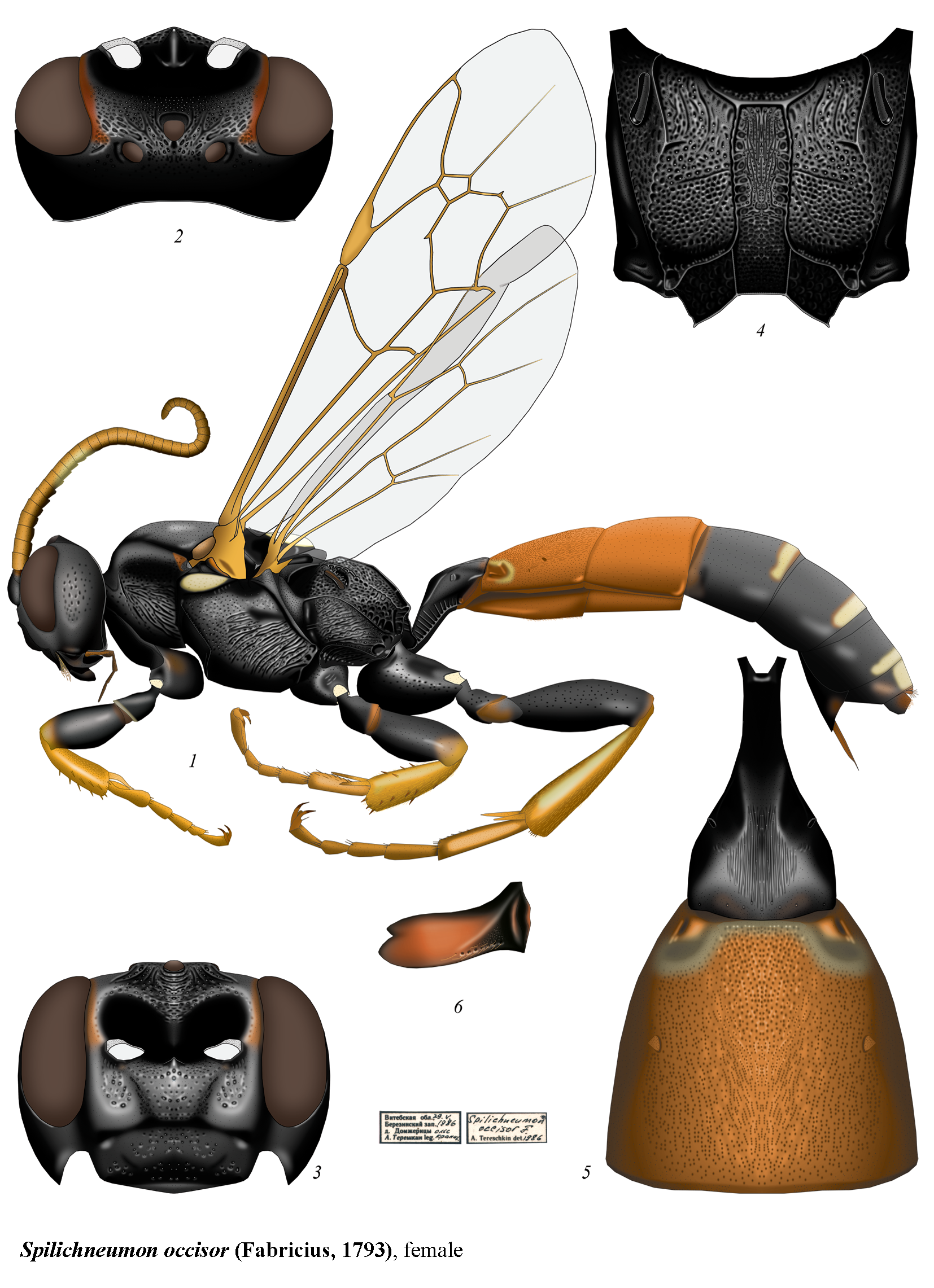

Scientific classification
- Domain: Eukaryota
- Kingdom: Animalia
- Phylum: Arthropoda
- Class: Insecta
- Order: Hymenoptera
- Family: Ichneumonidae
- Tribe: Ichneumonini
- Genus: Spilichneumon; Thomson, 1894

= Spilichneumon =

Genus of wasps

Spilichneumon is a genus of ichneumon wasps in the family Ichneumonidae. There are at least 30 described species in Spilichneumon.

== Species ==
These 33 species belong to the genus Spilichneumon:

- Spilichneumon ammonius (Gravenhorst, 1820)^{c g}
- Spilichneumon anurus (Thomson, 1888)^{c g}
- Spilichneumon borealis (Provancher, 1882)^{c g}
- Spilichneumon bronteus (Cresson, 1864)^{c g}
- Spilichneumon celenae Perkins, 1953^{c g}
- Spilichneumon celsiae (Tischbein, 1878)^{c g}
- Spilichneumon darjeelingensis Cameron, 1905^{c g}
- Spilichneumon doii Uchida, 1930^{c g}
- Spilichneumon flavicornis (Kiss, 1933)^{c g}
- Spilichneumon genalis Horstmann & Yu, 1999^{c g}
- Spilichneumon inconstans (Cresson, 1864)^{c g}
- Spilichneumon jezoensis Uchida, 1926^{c g}
- Spilichneumon johansoni (Holmgren, 1871)^{c g}
- Spilichneumon juxtus (Cresson, 1864)^{c g}
- Spilichneumon kodiakensis (Ashmead, 1902)^{c}
- Spilichneumon limnophilus (Thomson, 1888)^{c g}
- Spilichneumon nigrifrons (Holmgren, 1878)^{c g}
- Spilichneumon nubivagus (Cresson, 1867)^{c g}
- Spilichneumon obater (Kokujev, 1909)^{c g}
- Spilichneumon occisorius (Fabricius, 1793)^{c g}
- Spilichneumon pelloponesius Heinrich, 1972^{c g}
- Spilichneumon pernigricornis Heinrich, 1971^{c g}
- Spilichneumon physcoteloides Heinrich, 1961^{c g}
- Spilichneumon pici (Berthoumieu, 1894)^{c g}
- Spilichneumon primarius (Kokujev, 1909)^{c g}
- Spilichneumon pygmaeus Heinrich, 1978^{c g}
- Spilichneumon simplicidens (Thomson, 1888)^{c g}
- Spilichneumon spilosomae (Mocsary, 1886)^{c g}
- Spilichneumon superbus (Provancher, 1886)^{c g}
- Spilichneumon taos (Cresson, 1877)^{c g}
- Spilichneumon tennecabunensis (Heinrich, 1929)^{c g}
- Spilichneumon valdetypicus Heinrich, 1961^{c g}
- Spilichneumon victoriae Heinrich, 1965^{c g}

Data sources: i = ITIS, c = Catalogue of Life, g = GBIF, b = Bugguide.net
