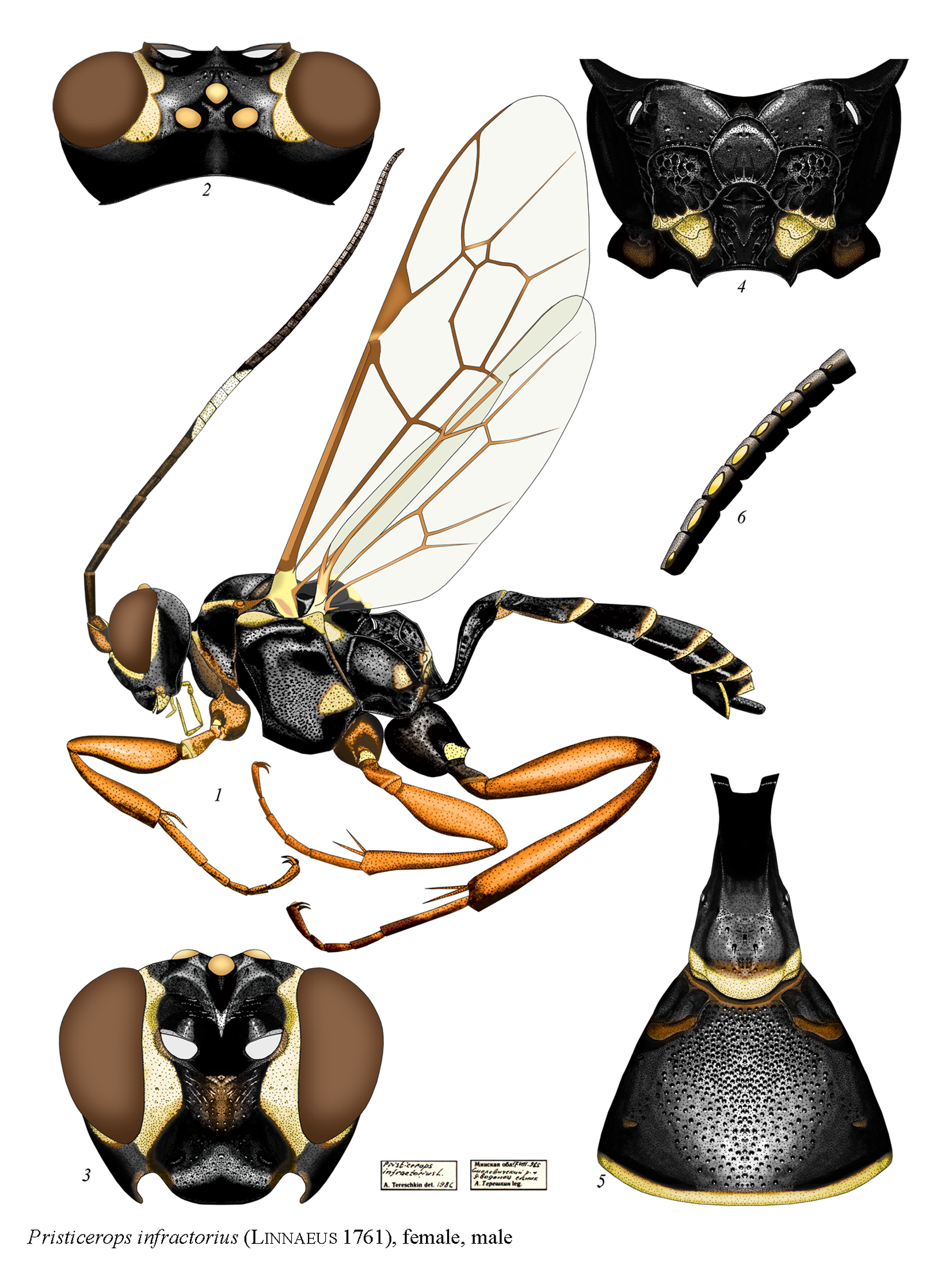
- Pristicerops infractorius

Scientific classification
- Domain: Eukaryota
- Kingdom: Animalia
- Phylum: Arthropoda
- Class: Insecta
- Order: Hymenoptera
- Family: Ichneumonidae
- Genus: Pristicerops; Heinrich, 1961

= Pristicerops =

Genus of insects

Pristicerops is a genus of parasitoid wasps belonging to the family Ichneumonidae.

The species of this genus are found in Europe.

Species:

- Pristicerops albosignatus (Habermehl, 1920)
- Pristicerops bakeri (Davis, 1898)
