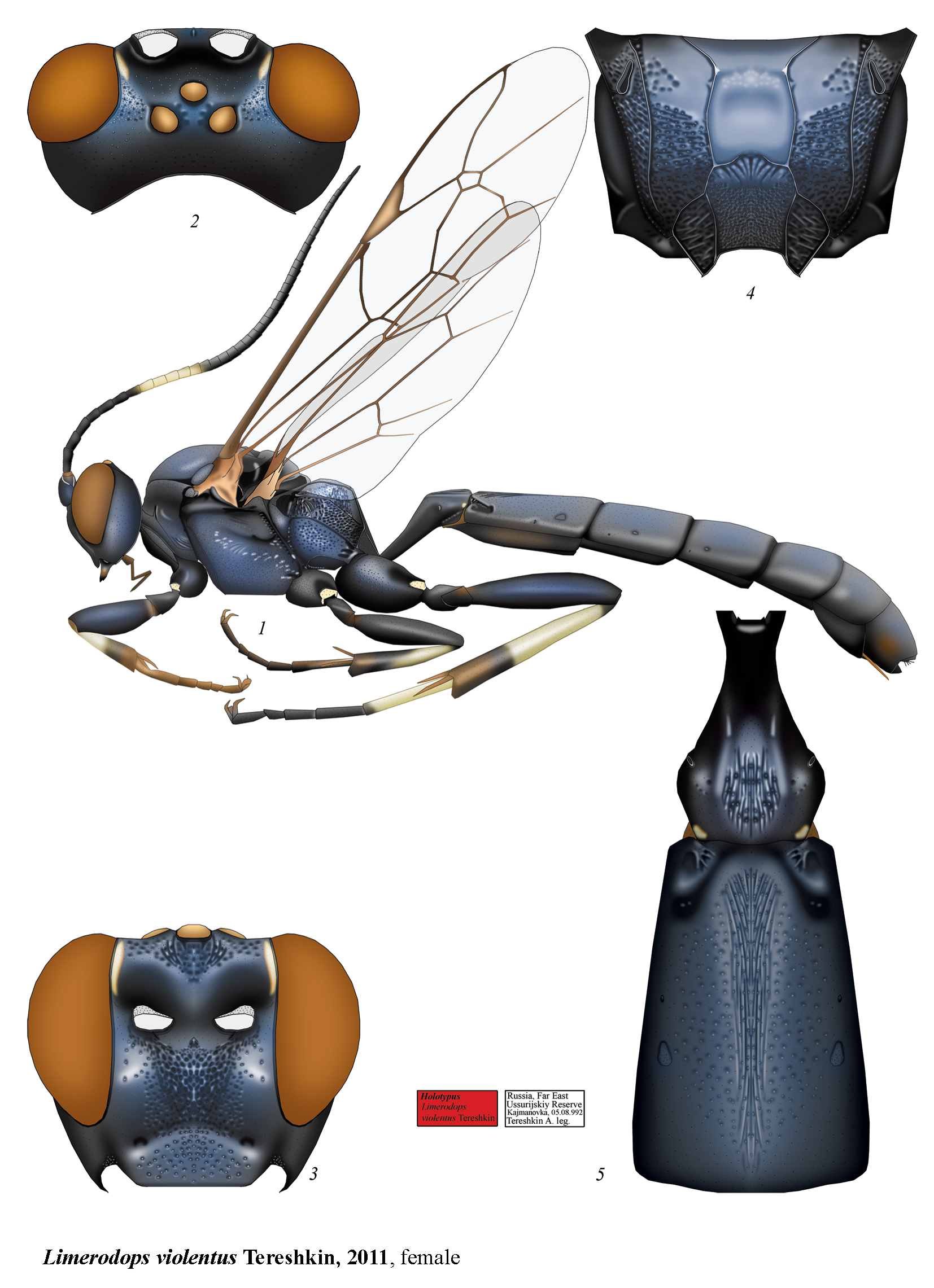

Scientific classification
- Domain: Eukaryota
- Kingdom: Animalia
- Phylum: Arthropoda
- Class: Insecta
- Order: Hymenoptera
- Family: Ichneumonidae
- Tribe: Ichneumonini
- Genus: Limerodops; Heinrich, 1949

= Limerodops =

Genus of wasps

Limerodops is a genus of ichneumon wasps in the family Ichneumonidae. There are about five described species in Limerodops.

== Species ==
These five species belong to the genus Limerodops:

- Limerodops belangeri (Cresson, 1877)^{c g b}
- Limerodops elongatus (Brischke, 1865)^{c g}
- Limerodops mariannae Heinrich, 1961^{c g b}
- Limerodops subsericans (Gravenhorst, 1820)^{c g}
- Limerodops unilineatus (Gravenhorst, 1829)^{c g}

Data sources: i = ITIS, c = Catalogue of Life, g = GBIF, b = Bugguide.net
