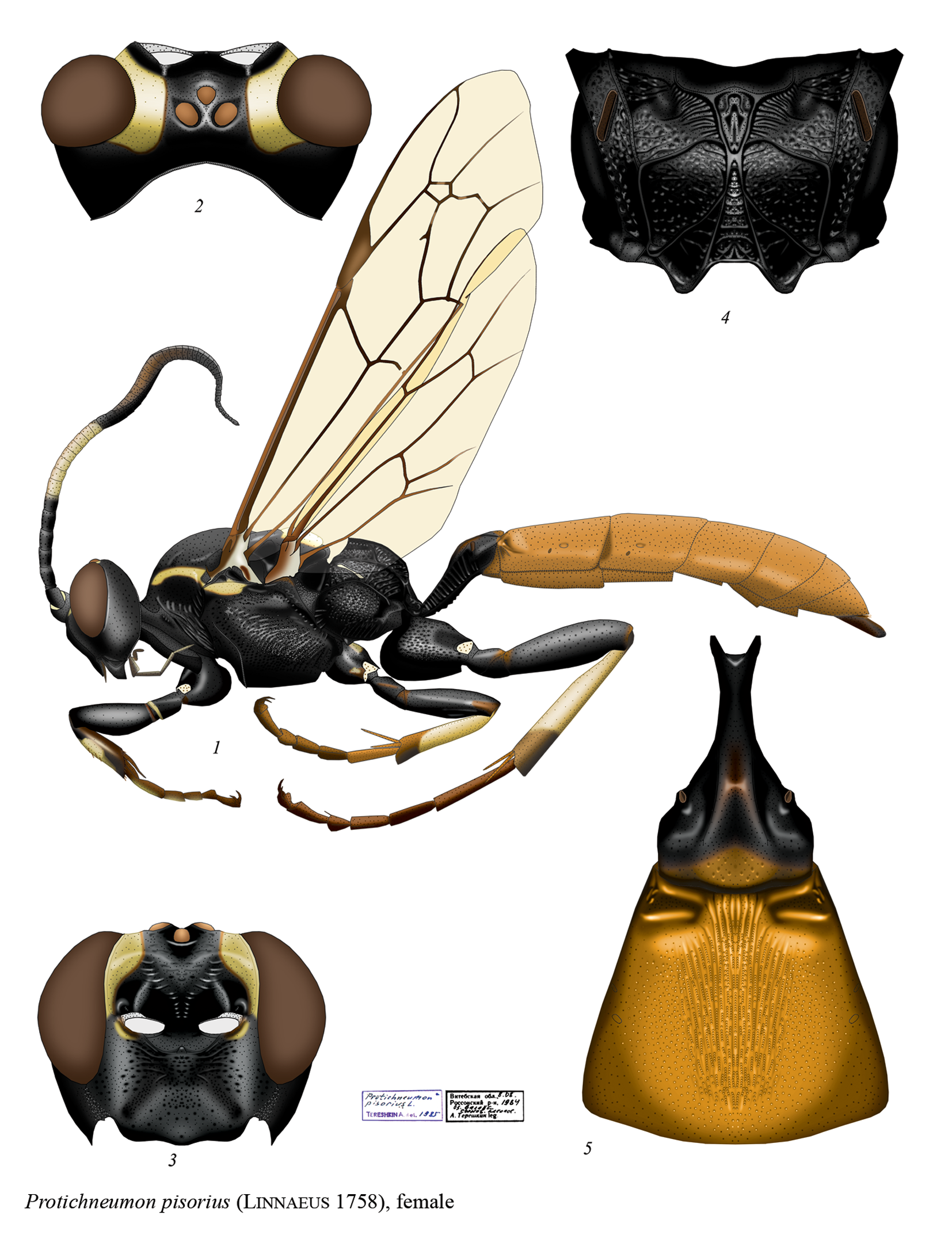
- Protichneumon pisorius

Scientific classification
- Domain: Eukaryota
- Kingdom: Animalia
- Phylum: Arthropoda
- Class: Insecta
- Order: Hymenoptera
- Family: Ichneumonidae
- Genus: Protichneumon; Thomson, 1893

= Protichneumon =

Genus of insects

Protichneumon is a genus of parasitoid wasps belonging to the family Ichneumonidae.

The species of this genus are found in Europe, Japan and Northern America.

Species:

- Protichneumon charlottae Heinrich, 1966
- Protichneumon chinensis (Uchida, 1937)
