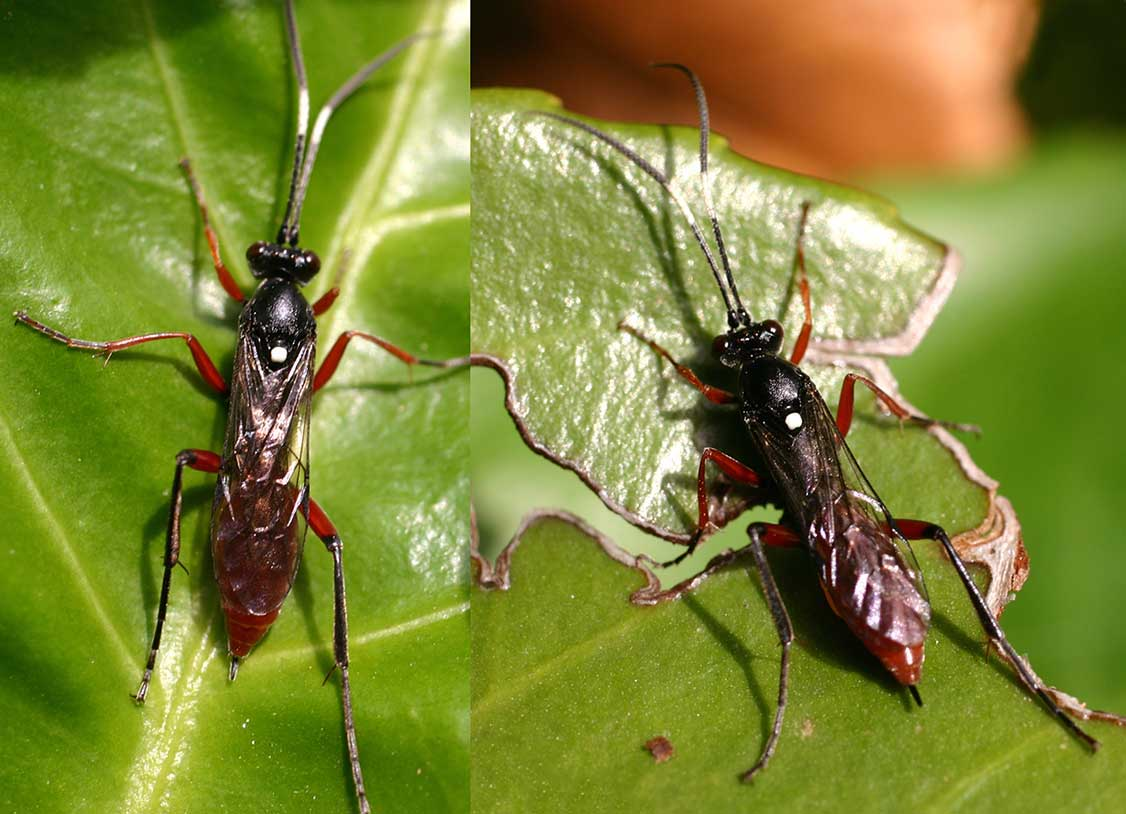
- Hoplismenus bispinatorius

Scientific classification
- Domain: Eukaryota
- Kingdom: Animalia
- Phylum: Arthropoda
- Class: Insecta
- Order: Hymenoptera
- Family: Ichneumonidae
- Genus: Hoplismenus; Gravenhorst, 1829

= Hoplismenus =

Genus of insects

Hoplismenus is a genus of parasitoid wasps belonging to the family Ichneumonidae.

The species of this genus are found in Europe and North America.

Species:

- Hoplismenus arizonensis Swift, 1946
- Hoplismenus axillatorius (Thunberg, 1822)
- Hoplismenus bidentatus (Gmelin, 1790)
- Hoplismenus birmanicus Heinrich, 1975
- Hoplismenus bispinatorius (Thunberg, 1822)
- Hoplismenus caucasicus (Clement, 1927)
- Hoplismenus coreanus Uchida, 1926
- Hoplismenus cornix Kriechbaumer, 1890
- Hoplismenus flagellator Riedel, 2020
- Hoplismenus hemimelas Heinrich, 1978
- Hoplismenus infulatus Kusigemati, 1988
- Hoplismenus istrianus (Clement, 1927)
- Hoplismenus jalapensis (Cameron, 1885)
- Hoplismenus krapinesis (Hensch, 1928)
- Hoplismenus lamprolabus Wesmael, 1857
- Hoplismenus morulus (Say, 1829)
- Hoplismenus obscurus Kriechbaumer, 1895
- Hoplismenus passivus (Cresson, 1874)
- Hoplismenus perarduus Porter, 1986
- Hoplismenus pica Wesmael, 1855
- Hoplismenus piliventris (Cameron, 1885)
- Hoplismenus polyleucos Heinrich, 1961
- Hoplismenus praeruptus Swift, 1946
- Hoplismenus rufipes (Cameron, 1904)
- Hoplismenus rutilus (Cresson, 1864)
- Hoplismenus scutellatus (Smith, 1858)
- Hoplismenus simulator Kokujev, 1909
- Hoplismenus terrificus Wesmael, 1848
- Hoplismenus tyrolensis (Clement, 1927)
