= Phaeogenes =

Scientific classification
- Kingdom: Animalia
- Phylum: Arthropoda
- Clade: Pancrustacea
- Class: Insecta
- Order: Hymenoptera
- Family: Ichneumonidae
- Genus: Phaeogenes; Wesmael, 1845

Genus of wasps

Phaeogenes is a genus of parasitoid wasps belonging to the family Ichneumonidae.

The species of this genus are found in Eurasia and Northern America.

== Selected species ==
- Phaeogenes acaudus (Provancher, 1882)
- Phaeogenes alternans Wesmael, 1845
