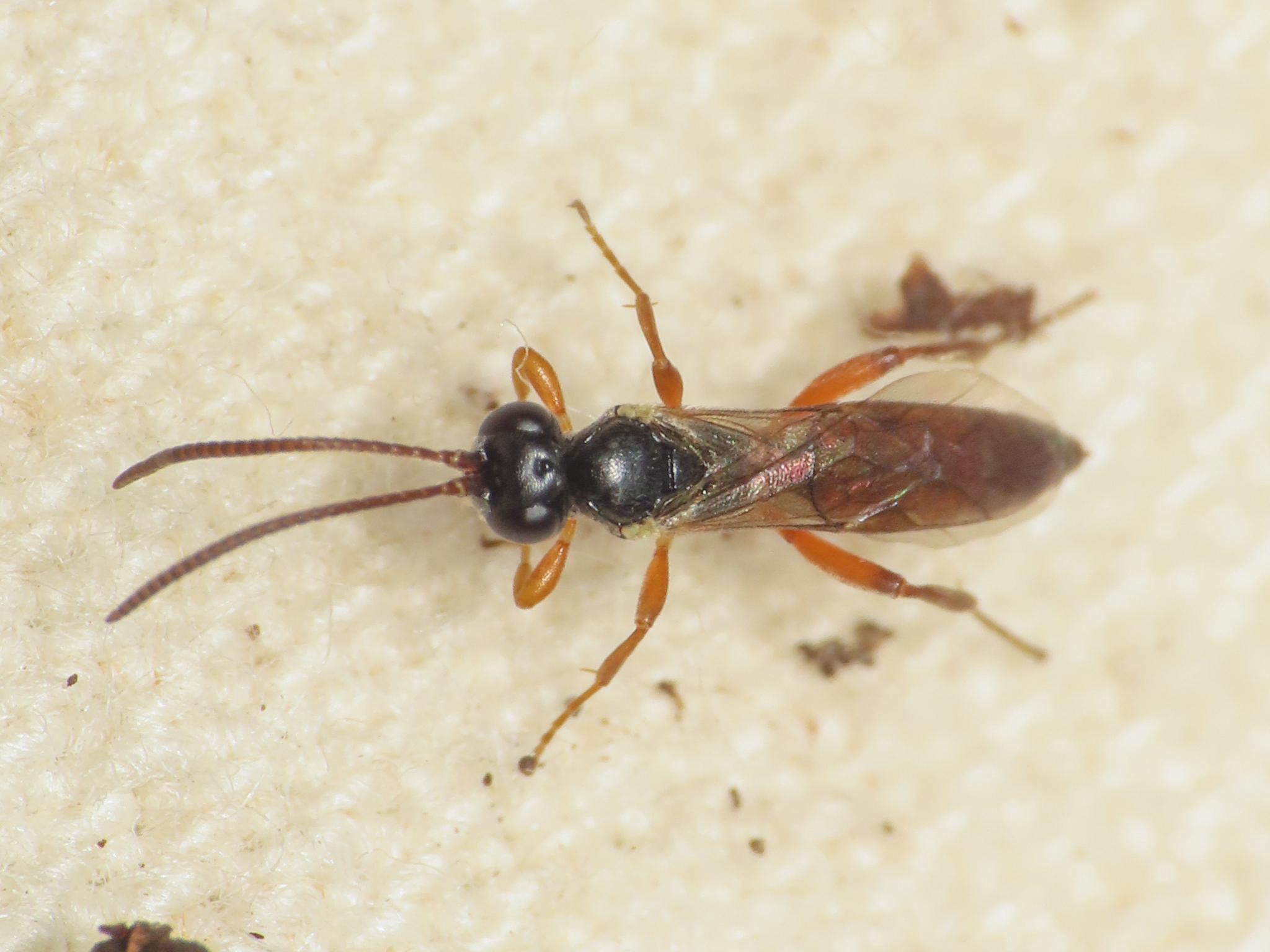
- Herpestomus minimus

Scientific classification
- Kingdom: Animalia
- Phylum: Arthropoda
- Class: Insecta
- Order: Hymenoptera
- Family: Ichneumonidae
- Genus: Herpestomus; Wesmael, 1845

Synonyms
- Harpestomus Ashmead, 1900

= Herpestomus =

Genus of wasps

Herpestomus is a genus of parasitoid wasps belonging to the family Ichneumonidae.

The species of this genus are found in Europe.

== Species ==
The following species are recognised in the genus Herpestomus:

- Herpestomus albomaculatus Strobl, 1901
- Herpestomus arridens (Gravenhorst, 1829)
- Herpestomus brunnicans Brischke, 1862
- Herpestomus brunnicornis (Gravenhorst, 1829)
- Herpestomus crassicornis Schmiedeknecht, 1903
- Herpestomus dichrous Schmiedeknecht, 1903
- Herpestomus henrytownesi Diller, 1983
- Herpestomus impressus Brischke, 1865
- Herpestomus jugicola Strobl, 1901
- Herpestomus maya Diller, 2005
- Herpestomus minimus (Berthoumieu, 1901)
- Herpestomus nasutus Wesmael, 1845
- Herpestomus nitidus Constantineanu, 1961
- Herpestomus pupivorus Gokhman, 1995
- Herpestomus schwarzi Diller, 2005
- Herpestomus sierramorenator Selfa, 1995
- Herpestomus wesmaeli Perkins, 1953
