= Tycherus =

Scientific classification
- Domain: Eukaryota
- Kingdom: Animalia
- Phylum: Arthropoda
- Class: Insecta
- Order: Hymenoptera
- Family: Ichneumonidae
- Genus: Tycherus; Förster, 1869

Genus of parasitoid wasps

Tycherus is a genus of parasitoid wasps belonging to the family Ichneumonidae.

The species of this genus are found in Europe and North America.

Species:

- Tycherus acutus (Gravenhorst, 1829)
- Tycherus amaenus (Wesmael, 1845)
