= Menkokia =

Scientific classification
- Domain: Eukaryota
- Kingdom: Animalia
- Phylum: Arthropoda
- Class: Insecta
- Order: Hymenoptera
- Family: Ichneumonidae
- Tribe: Ichneumonini
- Genus: Menkokia; Heinrich, 1934

Genus of wasps

Menkokia is a genus of ichneumon wasps in the family Ichneumonidae. There are at least four described species in Menkokia.

== Species ==
These four species belong to the genus Menkokia:

- Menkokia blandii (Cresson, 1864)
- Menkokia major (Heinrich, 1934)
- Menkokia minor (Heinrich, 1934)
- Menkokia minorisimilis (Heinrich, 1934)
