= Hypomecus =

Scientific classification
- Domain: Eukaryota
- Kingdom: Animalia
- Phylum: Arthropoda
- Class: Insecta
- Order: Hymenoptera
- Family: Ichneumonidae
- Genus: Hypomecus; Wesmael, 1845

Genus of insects

Hypomecus is a genus of parasitoid wasps belonging to the family Ichneumonidae.

The species of this genus are found in Europe and Northern America.

Species:

- Hypomecus quadriannulatus (Gravenhorst, 1829)
