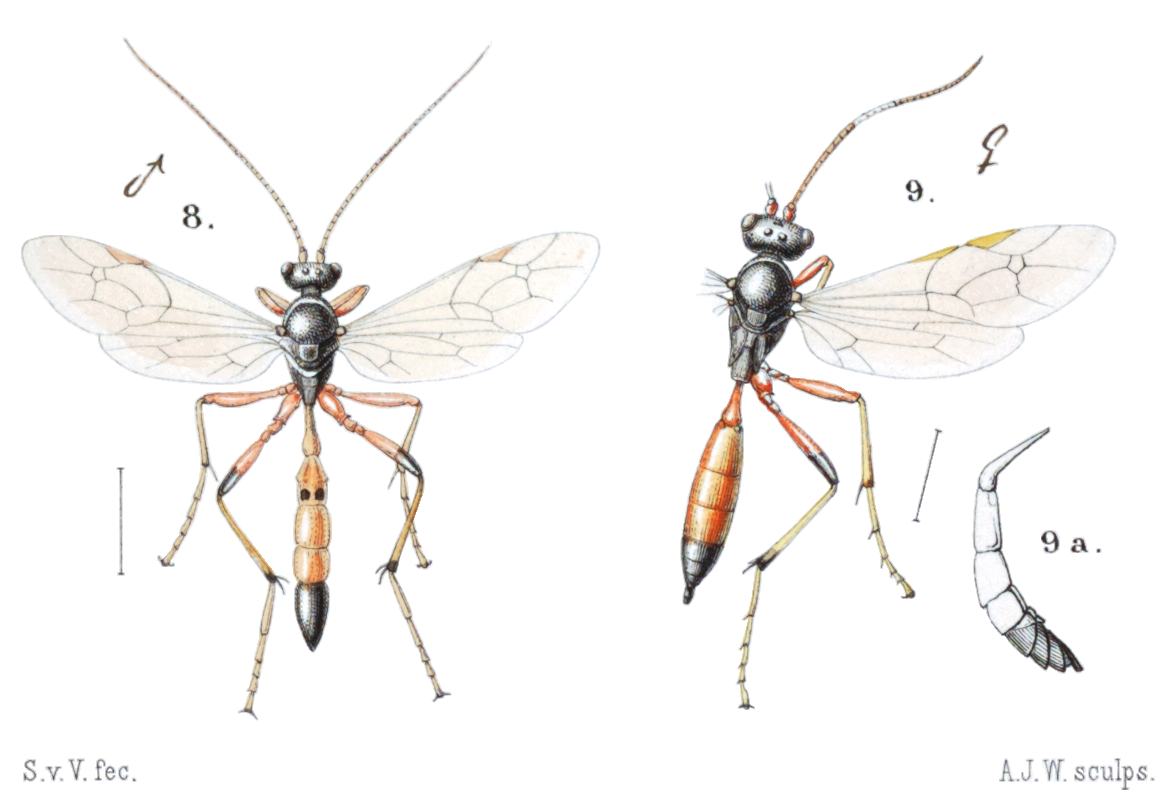
- Oronotus

Scientific classification
- Domain: Eukaryota
- Kingdom: Animalia
- Phylum: Arthropoda
- Class: Insecta
- Order: Hymenoptera
- Family: Ichneumonidae
- Genus: Oronotus; Wesmael, 1845

= Oronotus =

Genus of insects

Oronotus is a genus of parasitoid wasps belonging to the family Ichneumonidae.

The species of this genus are found in Europe and Africa.

Species:

- Oronotus albomaculatus Ashmead
- Oronotus binotatus (Gravenhorst, 1829)
