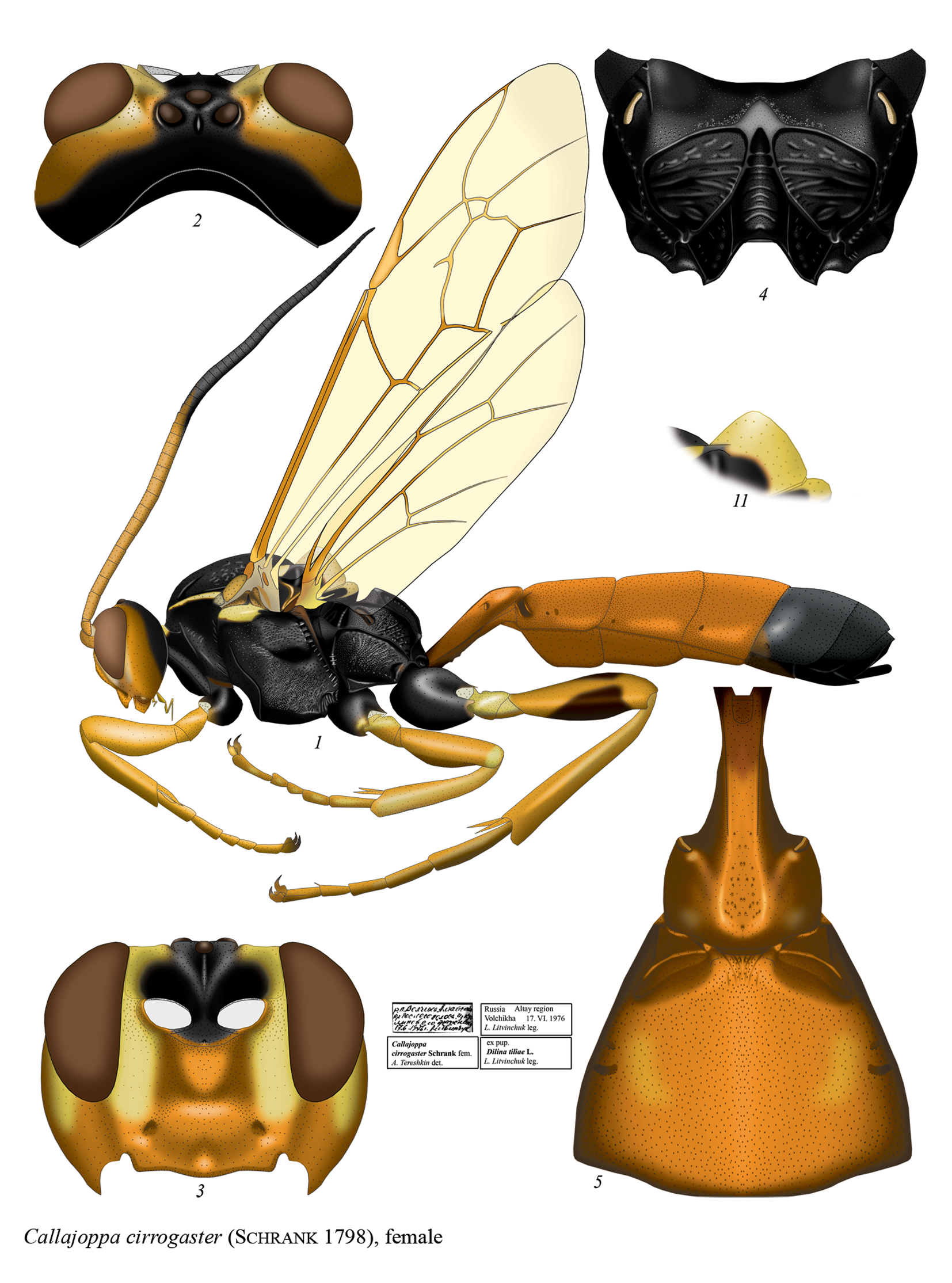

Scientific classification
- Domain: Eukaryota
- Kingdom: Animalia
- Phylum: Arthropoda
- Class: Insecta
- Order: Hymenoptera
- Family: Ichneumonidae
- Genus: Callajoppa; Cameron, 1903

= Callajoppa =

Genus of wasps

Callajoppa is a genus of parasitoid wasps belonging to the family Ichneumonidae.

The genus was first described by Peter Cameron in 1903.

The species of this genus are found in Europe and Japan.

Species:

- Callajoppa cirrogaster
- Callajoppa exaltatoria
