= Dicaelotus =

Scientific classification
- Domain: Eukaryota
- Kingdom: Animalia
- Phylum: Arthropoda
- Class: Insecta
- Order: Hymenoptera
- Family: Ichneumonidae
- Genus: Dicaelotus; Wesmael, 1845

Genus of insects

Dicaelotus is a genus of parasitoid wasps belonging to the family Ichneumonidae.

The species of this genus are found in Europe, Africa and Northern America.

Species:

- Dicaelotus albicinctus Habermehl, 1935
- Dicaelotus asantesana Rousse, van Noortan Noort & Diller, 2013
