= Chasmias =

Scientific classification
- Domain: Eukaryota
- Kingdom: Animalia
- Phylum: Arthropoda
- Class: Insecta
- Order: Hymenoptera
- Family: Ichneumonidae
- Genus: Chasmias

Genus of insects

Chasmias is a genus of parasitoid wasps belonging to the family Ichneumonidae.

The species of this genus are found in Europe, Japan and North America.

Species:

- Chasmias fuscus Uchida, 1926
- Chasmias lugens (Gravenhorst, 1829)
- Chasmias motatorius (Fabricius, 1775)
