= Trachyarus =

Scientific classification
- Kingdom: Animalia
- Phylum: Arthropoda
- Class: Insecta
- Order: Hymenoptera
- Family: Ichneumonidae
- Genus: Trachyarus; Thomson, 1891

Genus of parasitoid wasps

Trachyarus is a genus of parasitoid wasps belonging to the family Ichneumonidae.

The species of this genus are found in Europe.

Species:

- Trachyarus anceps (Berthoumieu, 1906)
- Trachyarus bacillatus Gokhman, 2007
