= Paraethecerus =

Paraethecerus sexmaculatus

Scientific classification
- Kingdom: Animalia
- Phylum: Arthropoda
- Class: Insecta
- Order: Coleoptera
- Suborder: Polyphaga
- Infraorder: Cucujiformia
- Family: Cerambycidae
- Genus: Paraethecerus
- Species: P. sexmaculatus

Binomial name
- Paraethecerus sexmaculatus Bruch, 1926

Genus of beetles

Paraethecerus sexmaculatus is a species of beetle in the family Cerambycidae, the only species in the genus Paraethecerus.
