= Notosemus =

Scientific classification
- Domain: Eukaryota
- Kingdom: Animalia
- Phylum: Arthropoda
- Class: Insecta
- Order: Hymenoptera
- Family: Ichneumonidae
- Genus: Notosemus; Förster, 1869

Genus of wasps

Notosemus is a genus of parasitoid wasps belonging to the family Ichneumonidae. There are about eight described species in Notosemus, found in Europe.

Species:

- Notosemus albimaculatus Sheng & Sun, 2016
- Notosemus bohemani (Wesmael, 1855)
- Notosemus inornatus Gokhman, 1993
- Notosemus planus Sheng & Sun, 2016
- Notosemus polyambonios Kusigemati, 1986
- Notosemus rufomaculatus (Cameron, 1903)
- Notosemus variegatus (Tosquinet, 1903)
- Notosemus wugongicus Sheng & Sun, 2016
