= Xanthosomnium =

Scientific classification
- Kingdom: Animalia
- Phylum: Arthropoda
- Clade: Pancrustacea
- Class: Insecta
- Order: Hymenoptera
- Family: Ichneumonidae
- Genus: Xanthosomnium; Wahl & Sime, 2002
- Species: X. froesei

Binomial name
- Xanthosomnium froesei Wahl & Sime, 2002

Genus of wasps

Xanthosomnium is a monotypic genus of wasps belonging to the family Ichneumonidae. The only species is Xanthosomnium froesei, named after German electronic musician Edgar Froese & his band Tangerine Dream.

The species is found in Central America.
