= Heterischnus =

Scientific classification
- Domain: Eukaryota
- Kingdom: Animalia
- Phylum: Arthropoda
- Class: Insecta
- Order: Hymenoptera
- Family: Ichneumonidae
- Genus: Heterischnus; Wesmael, 1859

Genus of wasps

Heterischnus is a genus of parasitoid wasps belonging to the family Ichneumonidae.

The species of this genus are found in Europe, North America, and Africa.

Species:

- Heterischnus africanus (Heinrich, 1936)
- Heterischnus anomalus (Wesmael, 1857)
- Heterischnus bicolorator (Aubert, 1965)
- Heterischnus coloradensis (Cushman, 1920)
- Heterischnus debilis (Gravenhorst, 1829)
- Heterischnus filiformis (Gravenhorst, 1829) - Xestia collina is its known host.
- Heterischnus huardi (Provancher, 1875)
- Heterischnus mexicanus Claridge, 2021
- Heterischnus mfongosi Rousse & van Noort, 2013
- Heterischnus mkomazi Rousse & van Noort, 2013
- Heterischnus olsoufieffi (Heinrich, 1938)
