= Colpognathus =

Scientific classification
- Kingdom: Animalia
- Phylum: Arthropoda
- Clade: Pancrustacea
- Class: Insecta
- Order: Hymenoptera
- Family: Ichneumonidae
- Genus: Colpognathus; Wesmael, 1845

Genus of insects

Colpognathus is a genus of parasitoid wasps belonging to the family Ichneumonidae.

The species of this genus are found in Europe and Northern America.

Species:

- Colpognathus annulicornis Ashmead
- Colpognathus capitatus (Berthoumieu, 1892)
