= Exephanes =

Scientific classification
- Domain: Eukaryota
- Kingdom: Animalia
- Phylum: Arthropoda
- Class: Insecta
- Order: Hymenoptera
- Family: Ichneumonidae
- Genus: Exephanes; Wesmael, 1845

Genus of insects

Exephanes is a genus of parasitoid wasps belonging to the family Ichneumonidae.

The species of this genus are found in Europe and Northern America.

Species:

- Exephanes californicus Heinrich, 1961
- Exephanes deliquus (Kokujev, 1909)
- Exephanes tauricus Hinz, 2000
