= Thyrateles =

Scientific classification
- Domain: Eukaryota
- Kingdom: Animalia
- Phylum: Arthropoda
- Class: Insecta
- Order: Hymenoptera
- Family: Ichneumonidae
- Genus: Thyrateles; Perkins, 1953

Genus of insects

Thyrateles is a genus of parasitoid wasps belonging to the family Ichneumonidae.

The species of this genus are found in Europe, Australia and Northern America.

Species:

- Thyrateles amoenapex Heinrich, 1961
- Thyrateles caliginops Heinrich, 1961
