= Hemichneumon =

Scientific classification
- Domain: Eukaryota
- Kingdom: Animalia
- Phylum: Arthropoda
- Class: Insecta
- Order: Hymenoptera
- Family: Ichneumonidae
- Genus: Hemichneumon; Wesmael, 1857

Genus of insects

Hemichneumon is a genus of parasitoid wasps belonging to the family Ichneumonidae.

The species of this genus are found in Europe.

Species:

- Hemichneumon subdolus Wesmael, 1857
