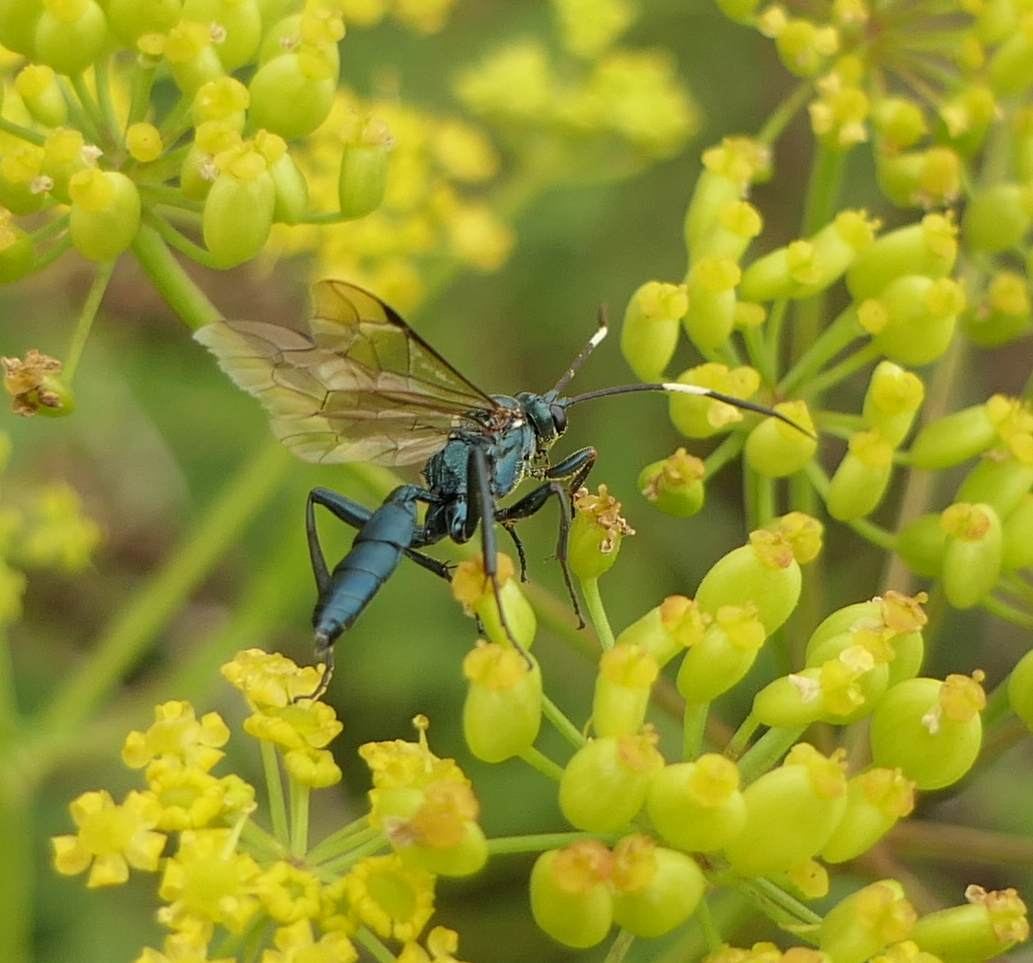
- Platylabus clarus, Canada

Scientific classification
- Domain: Eukaryota
- Kingdom: Animalia
- Phylum: Arthropoda
- Class: Insecta
- Order: Hymenoptera
- Family: Ichneumonidae
- Genus: Platylabus; Wesmael, 1845

= Platylabus =

Genus of insects

Platylabus is a genus of parasitoid wasps belonging to the family Ichneumonidae.

The genus has cosmopolitan distribution.

== Platylabus species ==
These 131 species are members of the genus Platylabus.

- Platylabus abbreviatus Heinrich, 1962
- Platylabus alaskae Heinrich, 1962
- Platylabus alboannulatus Uchida, 1932
- Platylabus altaicus Heinrich, 1978
- Platylabus altitudinis Turner, 1919
- Platylabus arcticus Roman, 1924
- Platylabus arizonae Heinrich, 1962
- Platylabus atricornis Pic, 1926
- Platylabus auriculatus Kriechbaumer, 1890
- Platylabus balearicus Hedwig, 1939
- Platylabus basicinctus Heinrich, 1974
- Platylabus baueri Riedel, 2008 (Europe)
- Platylabus berndi Heinrich, 1962
- Platylabus bicinctus Heinrich, 1974
- Platylabus bobadillai Porter, 1986
- Platylabus borealis Holmgren, 1871 (Europe)
- Platylabus breviscutellatus Heinrich, 1974
- Platylabus brilliantus Kusigemati, 1986 (temperate Asia)
- Platylabus cabrerai Berthoumieu, 1903
- Platylabus caeruleus (Cameron, 1901)
- Platylabus calidus Berthoumieu, 1904
- Platylabus captiosus Heinrich, 1974
- Platylabus cariniscutis (Cameron, 1904)
- Platylabus charlottae Heinrich, 1974
- Platylabus chiapus (Cresson, 1874)
- Platylabus clarus (Cresson, 1867) (North America)
- Platylabus columbiae Heinrich, 1962
- Platylabus concinnus Thomson, 1888 (Europe)
- Platylabus curtorius (Thunberg, 1822) (Europe)
- Platylabus decipiens Wesmael, 1848 (Europe)
- Platylabus dilleri Heinrich, 1971
- Platylabus divinus Heinrich, 1974
- Platylabus divisatae Heinrich, 1962
- Platylabus dolorosus (Gravenhorst, 1829) (Europe)
- Platylabus dubitator Habermehl, 1917
- Platylabus duplificans Heinrich, 1962
- Platylabus eros (Cameron, 1885)
- Platylabus erythrocoxa Heinrich, 1962
- Platylabus eurygaster Holmgren, 1871
- Platylabus ferrugineus Cameron, 1903
- Platylabus flavidoclarus Heinrich, 1977
- Platylabus foxleei Heinrich, 1962 (North America)
- Platylabus fugator (Gravenhorst, 1807) (Europe)
- Platylabus fuscinerva (Cameron, 1901)
- Platylabus gigas Kriechbaumer, 1886 (Europe)
- Platylabus goliath Heinrich, 1974
- Platylabus gracilicornis (Viereck, 1903)
- Platylabus histrio Wesmael, 1855 (Europe)
- Platylabus hyperetis Heinrich, 1962
- Platylabus imitans Heinrich, 1962 (North America)
- Platylabus incabus Davis, 1898
- Platylabus infirmus Heinrich, 1974
- Platylabus intermedius Holmgren, 1871 (Europe)
- Platylabus iridipennis (Gravenhorst, 1829) (Europe)
- Platylabus judaicus Berthoumieu, 1900
- Platylabus lieftincki Heinrich, 1934
- Platylabus lissosculptus Heinrich, 1962
- Platylabus longicornis (Brischke, 1891)
- Platylabus luteatae Heinrich, 1962 (North America)
- Platylabus massajae Gribodo, 1879
- Platylabus mcclintockae Kittel, 2016
- Platylabus melanocoxa Heinrich, 1962
- Platylabus mesoleucus Heinrich, 1936 (Europe)
- Platylabus metallicus Bradley, 1903
- Platylabus micheneri Heinrich, 1962
- Platylabus minor Riedel, 2008 (Europe)
- Platylabus moestificus Berthoumieu, 1897
- Platylabus monitus (Cresson, 1868)
- Platylabus monotonops Heinrich, 1962
- Platylabus monotonus Heinrich, 1962
- Platylabus montanus Cresson, 1877
- Platylabus muticus Thomson, 1894
- Platylabus neglectus (Fonscolombe, 1847) (Europe)
- Platylabus nigricornis Uchida, 1926
- Platylabus nigrocyaneus (Gravenhorst, 1829) (Europe)
- Platylabus obator (Desvignes, 1856) (Europe)
- Platylabus odiosus Perkins, 1953 (Europe)
- Platylabus oehlkei Heinrich, 1972
- Platylabus okui Uchida, 1956
- Platylabus opaculus Thomson, 1888 (Europe)
- Platylabus opiparus (Cameron, 1885)
- Platylabus ornatus (Provancher, 1875)
- Platylabus pallidens Wesmael, 1853 (Europe)
- Platylabus parvimaculatus (Cameron, 1903)
- Platylabus parvulus Berthoumieu, 1904
- Platylabus pedatorius Fabricius, 1793 (Europe)
- Platylabus perexiguus Heinrich, 1973 (Europe)
- Platylabus permodestus Heinrich, 1962
- Platylabus polymelas Heinrich, 1962
- Platylabus pseudhistrio Heinrich, 1962
- Platylabus pseudogoliath Heinrich, 1974
- Platylabus pseudopumilio Riedel, 2008 (Europe)
- Platylabus pulcher Cushman, 1922
- Platylabus pullus Wesmael, 1853 (Europe)
- Platylabus pumilio Holmgren, 1871 (Europe)
- Platylabus punctifrons Thomson, 1888 (Europe)
- Platylabus rubeus Valemberg, 1976
- Platylabus rubricapensis Provancher, 1882 (North America)
- Platylabus rubristernatus Heinrich, 1962
- Platylabus ruficoxatus Riedel, 2008 (Europe)
- Platylabus rufus Wesmael, 1845 (Europe)
- Platylabus semiopacus Heinrich, 1962
- Platylabus septemcingulatus Heinrich, 1974
- Platylabus serratae Heinrich, 1962
- Platylabus sexmaculatae Heinrich, 1962
- Platylabus shanicus Heinrich, 1974
- Platylabus sphageti Heinrich, 1971
- Platylabus spiraculus Uchida, 1926
- Platylabus stolidus Perkins, 1953
- Platylabus submarginatus Magretti, 1896
- Platylabus subpinguis (Cameron, 1885)
- Platylabus subrubricus Heinrich, 1962
- Platylabus sulci Gregor, 1940
- Platylabus taiwanus Kusigemati, 1986 (temperate Asia)
- Platylabus takeuchii Uchida, 1930 (temperate Asia)
- Platylabus tenuicornis (Cresson, 1868) (Europe)
- Platylabus tenuiformis Heinrich, 1962
- Platylabus thalhammeri Strobl, 1901
- Platylabus theresae Pic, 1914
- Platylabus tibialis Ashmead, 1901
- Platylabus transversus Bridgman, 1889 (Europe)
- Platylabus tricingulatus (Gravenhorst, 1820) (Europe)
- Platylabus uranius (Dalman, 1823) (Europe)
- Platylabus vaferops Heinrich, 1962
- Platylabus vibicariae Kriechbaumer, 1888
- Platylabus vibratorius (Thunberg, 1822) (Europe)
- Platylabus victorianus Heinrich, 1974
- Platylabus virescens (Cresson, 1874)
- Platylabus volubilis (Gravenhorst, 1829) (Europe)
- Platylabus wienkeri (Ratzeburg, 1844) (Europe)
- Platylabus zagoriensis Heinrich, 1930
