= Centeterus =

Scientific classification
- Domain: Eukaryota
- Kingdom: Animalia
- Phylum: Arthropoda
- Class: Insecta
- Order: Hymenoptera
- Family: Ichneumonidae
- Genus: Centeterus; Wesmael, 1845

Genus of insects

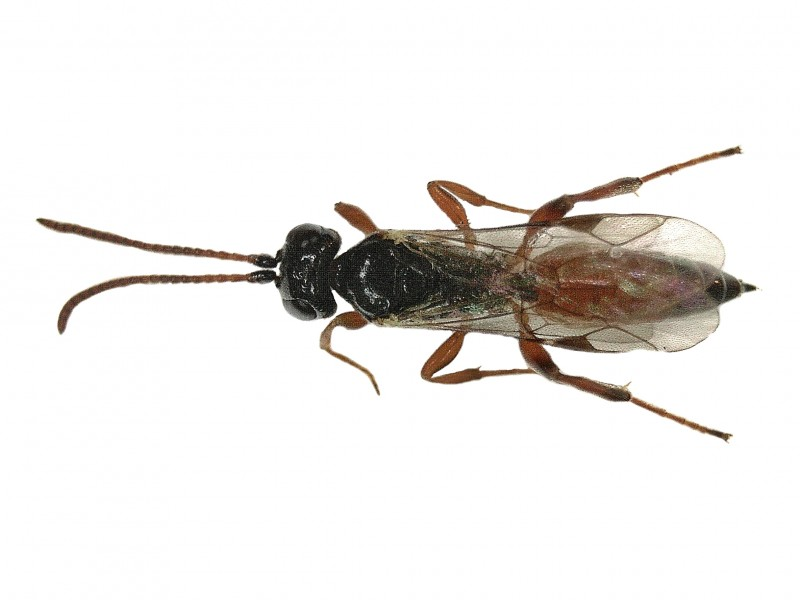

Centeterus is a genus of parasitoid wasps belonging to the family Ichneumonidae.

The species of this genus are found in Europe and Northern America.

Species:

- Centeterus alpinus (Cameron, 1885)
- Centeterus balearicus (Kriechbaumer, 1894)
