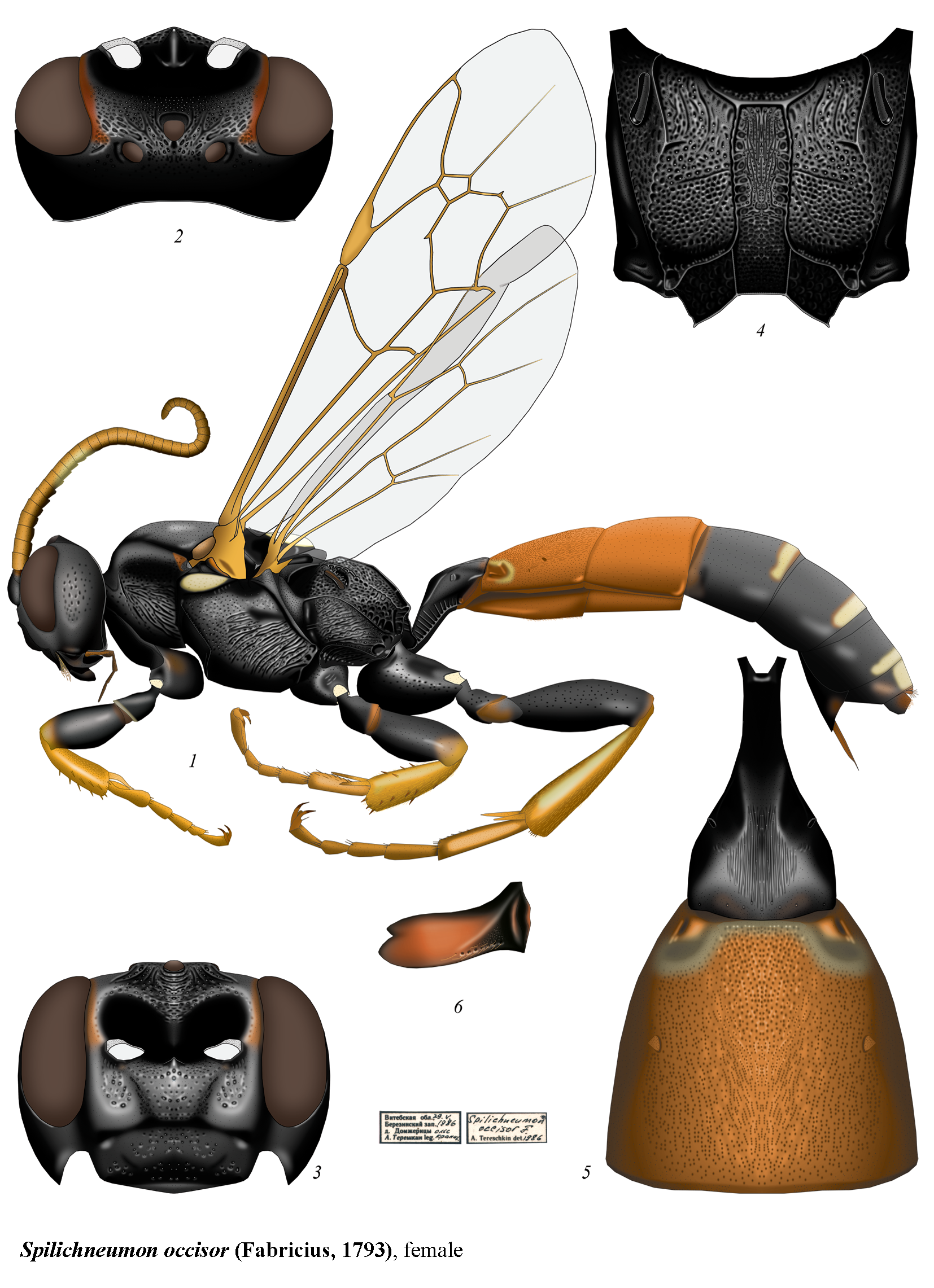
- Spilichneumon

Scientific classification
- Kingdom: Animalia
- Phylum: Arthropoda
- Clade: Pancrustacea
- Class: Insecta
- Order: Hymenoptera
- Family: Ichneumonidae
- Subfamily: Ichneumoninae; Latreille, 1802

Tribes
- Abzariini Santos & Wahl, 2021; Alomyini Förster; Eurylabini Heinrich; Ichneumonini Latreille, 1802; Notosemini Townes; Phaeogenini Förster; Platylabini Berthoumieu

= Ichneumoninae =

Subfamily of wasps

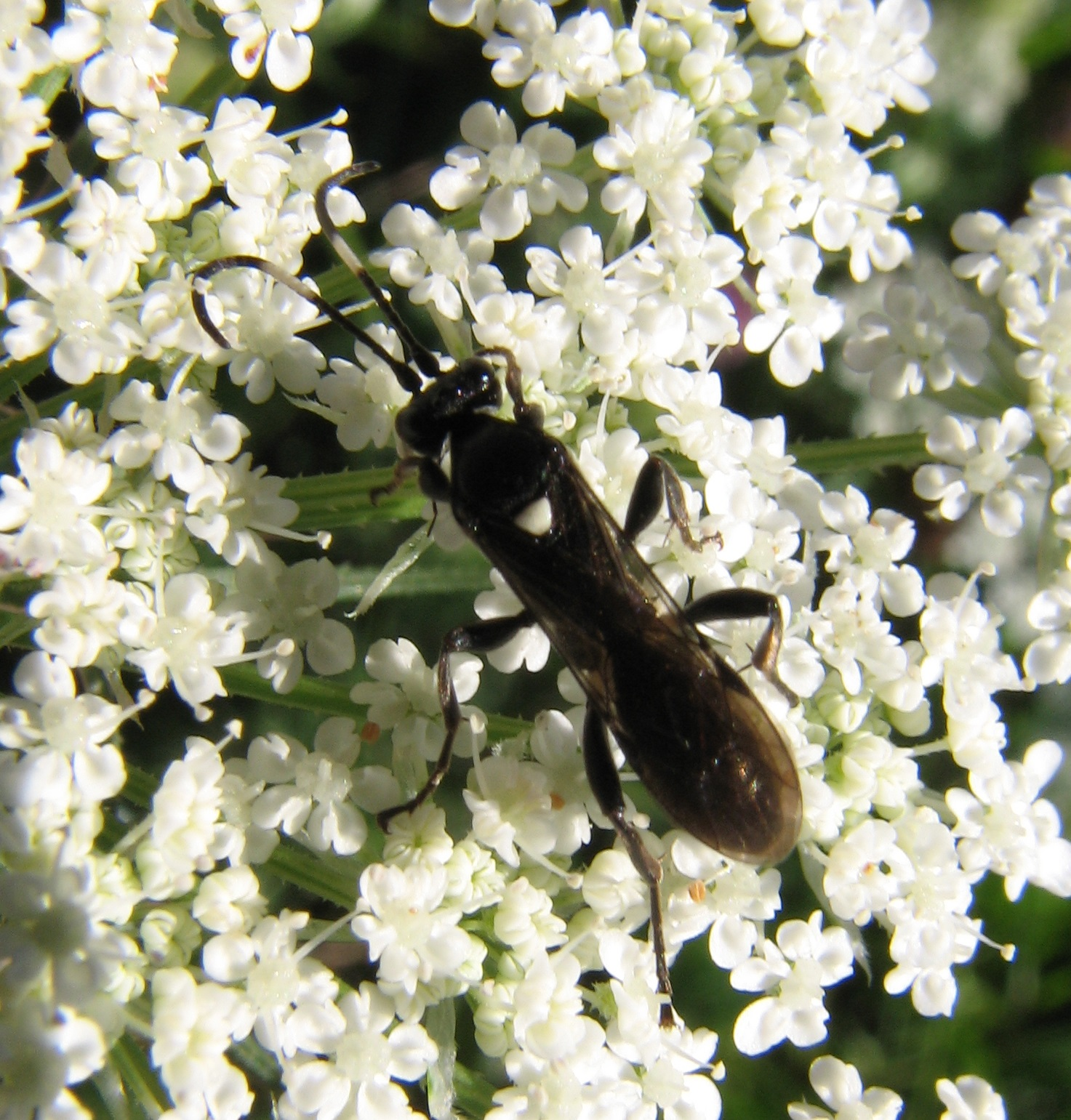
Vulgichneumon brevicinctor, female

Ichneumoninae is a worldwide subfamily of the parasitic wasp family Ichneumonidae.

Ichneumoninae are koinobiont or idiobiont endoparasitoids of Lepidoptera. It is the second largest subfamily of Ichneumonidae, with 373 genera. Ichneumonines are often large, conspicuous colourful insects. They have a 5-sided areolet, a dorso-ventrally flattened abdomen, a short or absent sternaulus and the clypeus is truncate, exposing the labium.

There are more than 420 genera and 4375 described species in Ichneumoninae.

Ichneumoninae was formerly made up of 15 tribes, but research published in 2021 determined that the tribes Ceratojoppini, Clypeodromini, Compsophorini, Ctenocalini, Goedartiini, Heresiarchini, Ischnojoppini, Joppocryptini, Listrodromini, and Oedicephalini should be incorporated into Ichneumonini as junior synonyms. After these tribes were merged and two new tribes were added, Ichneumoninae consisted of 7 tribes, with Ichneumonini the largest by far with well over 300 genera.

Some of the more common Ichneumoninae genera observed in iNaturalist are Amblyteles, Coelichneumon, Cratichneumon, Ichneumon, Limonethe, Trogus, and Vulgichneumon, all in the tribe Ichneumonini.

== See also ==
- List of Ichneumoninae genera
