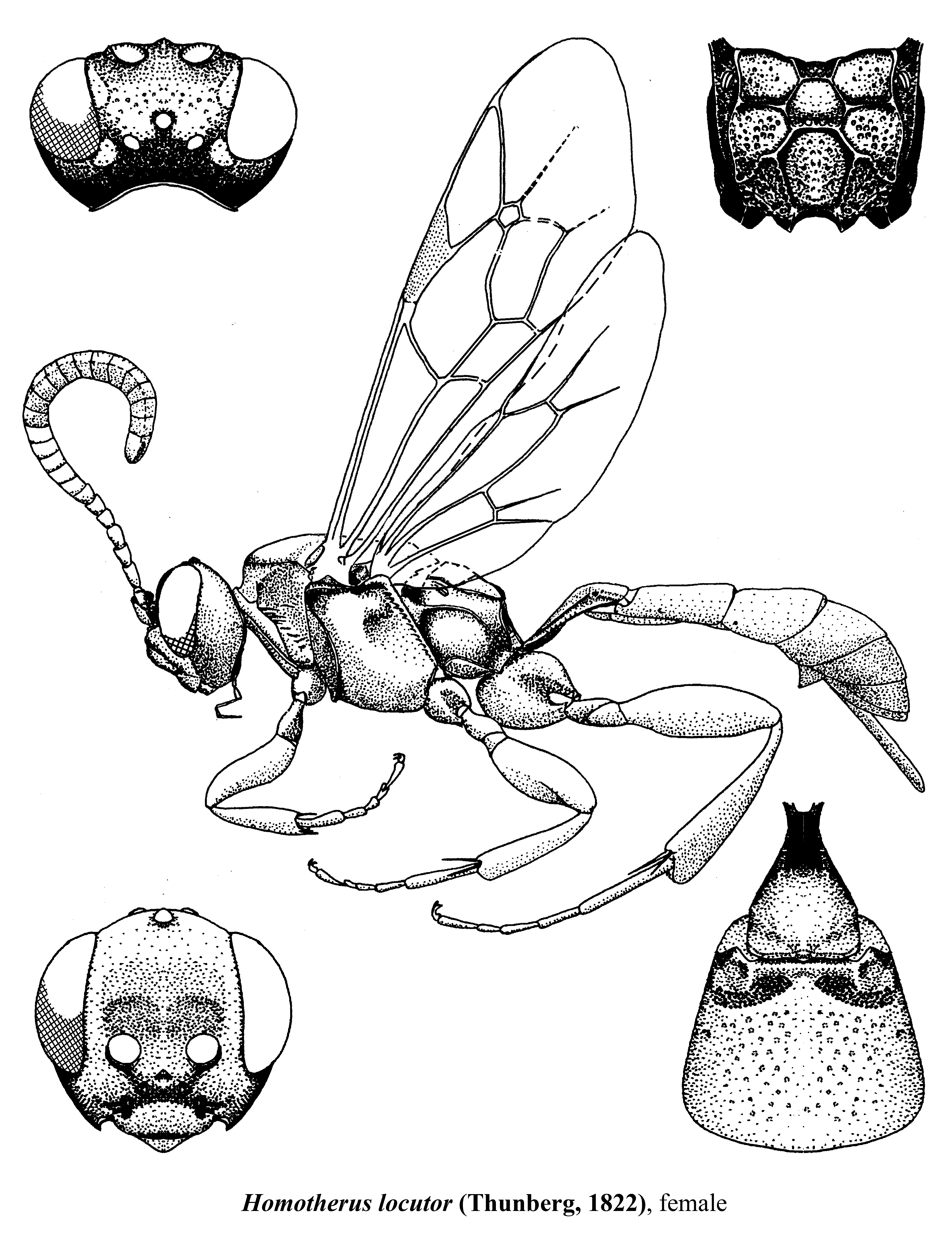
- Homotherus locutor

Scientific classification
- Domain: Eukaryota
- Kingdom: Animalia
- Phylum: Arthropoda
- Class: Insecta
- Order: Hymenoptera
- Family: Ichneumonidae
- Genus: Homotherus; Förster, 1869

= Homotherus =

Genus of insects

Homotherus is a genus of parasitoid wasps belonging to the family Ichneumonidae.

The species of this genus are found in Europe and Northern America.

== Selected species ==
- Homotherus berthoumieui (Pic, 1899)
- Homotherus erythromelas (McLachlan, 1878)
