= Royal Entomological Society Handbooks =

Book series

Handbooks for the Identification of British Insects is a series of books produced by the Royal Entomological Society (RES). The aim of the Handbooks is to provide illustrated identification keys to the insects of Britain, together with concise morphological, biological and distributional information. The series also includes several Check Lists of British Insects. All books contain line drawings, with the most recent volumes including colour photographs. In recent years, new volumes in the series have been published by Field Studies Council, and benefit from association with the AIDGAP identification guides and Synopses of the British Fauna.

== Full list of titles ==
=== Vol : 1 - Small Orders ===
Title	Edition	Vol	Date	Auth	Pages
Thysanura and Diplura		Vol 1 Pt 2	1954	Delany, M.J.	7
Dermaptera and Orthoptera	1st	Vol 1 Pt 5	1949	Hincks, W.D.	20
Dermaptera and Orthoptera	2nd	Vol 1 Pt 5	1956	Hincks, W.D.	24
Plecoptera		Vol 1 Pt 6	1950	Kimmins, D.E.	18
Psocids Psocoptera (Booklice and Barklice)	1st	Vol 1 Pt 7	1974	New, T.R.	102
Psocids Psocoptera (Booklice and Barklice)	2nd	Vol 1 Pt 7	2006	New, T.R.	146
Ephemeroptera		Vol 1 Pt 9	1950	Kimmins, D.E.	18
Odonata	1st	Vol 1 Pt 10	1949	Fraser, F.C.	48
Odonata	2nd	Vol 1 Pt 10	1956	Fraser, F.C.	49
Thysanoptera		Vol 1 Pt 11	1976	Mound, L.A.; Morison, G.D.; Pitkin, B.R. & Palmer, J.M.	76
Mecoptera, Megaloptera and Neuroptera		Vol 1 Pt 12-13	1959	Fraser, F.C.	40
Trichoptera, Hydroptilidae		Vol 1 Pt 14a	1978	Marshall, J.E.	31
Fleas (Siphonaptera)	1st	Vol 1 Pt 16	1957	Smit, F. G. A. M.	94
Fleas (Siphonaptera)	2nd	Vol 1 Pt 16	2007	Whitaker, A.P.	vi, 178
The adult Trichoptera (caddisflies) of Britain and Ireland	1st	Vol 1 Pt 17	2012	Barnard, P. & Ross, E.	192

=== Vol : 2 - Hemiptera ===
Title	Edition	Vol	Date	Auth	Pages
Cicadomorpha-Cicadellidae, Membracidae, Cercopidae and Cicadellidae (except Deltocephaline and Typhlocybinae)		Vol 2 Pt 2a	1965	Le Quesne, W.J	64
Cicadomorpha-Cicadellidae (Deltocephaline)		Vol 2 Pt 2b	1969	Le Quesne, W.J	84
Cicadomorpha-Cicadellidae (Typhlocybinae)		Vol 2 Pt 2c	1981	Le Quesne, W.J.; Payne, K.R.	95
Fulgoromorpha		Vol 2 Pt 3	1960	Le Quesne, W.J.	68
Aphidoidea-Chaitophoridae and Callaphididae		Vol 2 Pt 4a	1976	Stroyan, H.L.G.	130
Psylloidea (Adults)		Vol 2 Pt 5a	1979	White, I.M.; Hodkinson, I.D.	79
Psylloidea (nymphal stages)		Vol 2 Pt 5b	1982	White, I.M.; Hodkinson, I.D.	50
Aphids - Pterocommatinae and Aphidinae (Aphidinae)		Vol 2 Pt 6	1984	Stroyan, H.L.G.	232
Aphids - Macrosiphini (Aphidinae)		Vol 2 Pt 7	2010	Blackman, R. L.	414
Aphids - Anoeciinae, Lachninae, Eriosomatinae, Phyloemyzinae, Thelazinae, Hormaphildinae, Mindarinae		Vol 2 Pt 8	2019	Blackman, R., Dransfield, R.D.; Brightwell, R.	viii, 216

=== Vol : 4 - Coleoptera ===
Title	Edition	Vol	Date	Auth	Pages
Coleoptera. Introduction and Key to Families		Vol 4 Pt 1	1956	Crowson, R.A.	48
British Coleoptera larvae. A guide to the families and major subfamilies.		Vol 4 Pt 1a	2019	Peter M. Hammond, Jane E. Marshall, Michael L. Cox, Leslie Jessop, Beulah H. Garner & Maxwell V.L. Barclay	280
The Carabidae (ground beetles) of Britain and Ireland	1st	Vol 4 Pt 2	1974	Lindroth, C.H	148
The Carabidae (ground beetles) of Britain and Ireland	2nd	Vol 4 Pt 2	2007	Luff, M.	iv, 247
Coleoptera: Hydradephaga		Vol 4 Pt 3	1953	Balfour-Browne, F.	33
Keys to adults of the water beetles of Britain and Ireland (Part 1)		Vol 4 Pt 5	2011	Foster, G.N.; Friday, L.E.	144
Keys to adults of the water beetles of Britain and Ireland (Part 2)		Vol 4 Pt 5b	2014	Foster, G.N.; Bilton, D.T.; Friday, L.E.	126
Coleoptera: Clambidae		Vol 4 Pt 6a	1966	Johnson, C.	13
Staphylinidae-Piestinae		Vol 4 Pt 8a	1954	Tottenham, C.E.	79
Pselaphidae		Vol 4 Pt 9	1957	Pearce, E.J.	32
Coleoptera: Histeroidea. Sphaeritidae and Histeridae		Vol 4 Pt 10	1963	Halstead, D.G.H.	16

=== Vol : 5 - Coleoptera ===
Title	Edition	Vol	Date	Auth	Pages
Buprestidae		Vol 5 Pt 1b	1977	Levey, B.	8
Heteroceridae		Vol 5 Pt 2c	1973	Clarke, R.O.S.	15
Dermestidae and Derodontidae		Vol 5 Pt 3	1993	Peacock, E.R.	144
Rhizophagidae		Vol 5 Pt 5a	1977	Peacock, E.R.	19
Phalacridae		Vol 5 Pt 5b	1958	Thompson, R.T.	17
Kateretidae & Nitidulidae: Meligethinae (Pollen beetles)		Vol 5 Pt 6a	1996	Kirk-Spriggs, A.H.	157
Coccinellidae and Sphindidae		Vol 5 Pt 7	1953	Pope, R.D.	12
Lagriidae-Meloidae		Vol 5 Pt 9	1954	Buck, F.D.	30
Tenebrionidae		Vol 5 Pt 10	1975	Brendell, M.J.D.	10
Dung Beetles and Chafers (Scarabaeoidea)	1st	Vol 5 Pt 11	1956	Britton, E.B.	29
Dung Beetles and Chafers (Scarabaeoidea)	2nd	Vol 5 Pt 11	1986	Jessop, L	53
Cerambycidae		Vol 5 Pt 12	1952	Duffy, E.A.J.	18
Scolytidae & Platypodidae		Vol 5 Pt 15	1953	Duffy, E.A.J.	20
Orthocerous weevils (Curculionoidae - Nemonychidae, Anthribidae, Urodontidae, Attelabidae & Apionidae)		Vol 5 Pt 16	1990	Morris, M.G	108
Curculionidae: Entiminae (Broad-nosed weevils)		Vol 5 Pt 17a	1997	Morris, M.G	106
Curculionidae: Raymondionyminae - Smicronychinae (True weevils - part 1)		Vol 5 Pt 17b	2002	Morris, M.G	149
Curculionidae: Ceutorhynchinae (True weevils - part 2)		Vol 5 Pt 17c	2008	Morris, M.G	149
Curculioninae, Baridinae, Orobitidinae (True weevils - part 3)		Vol 5 Pt 17d	2012	Morris, M.G	136
British Scraptiidae		Vol 5 Pt 18	2009	Levey, B.	32

=== Vol : 6 - Hymenoptera ===
Title	Edition	Vol	Date	Auth	Pages
Introduction and key to families		Vol 6 Pt 1	1977	Richards, O.W.	100
Symphyta (except Tenthredinidae)	1st	Vol 6 Pt 2a	1951	Benson, R.B.	
Symphyta (except Tenthredinidae)	2nd	Vol 6 Pt 2a	1981	Quinlan, J.; Gauld, I.D.	67
Hymenoptera Symphyta section (b)		Vol 6 Pt 2b	1951	Benson, R.B.	88
Hymenoptera Symphyta section (c)		Vol 6 Pt 2c	1958	Benson, R.B.	114
Bethyloidea-Embolemidae, Bethylidae and Dryinidae		Vol 6 Pt 3a	1976	Perkins, J.F.	38
Scolioidea, Vespoidea and Sphecoidea (Hymenoptera, Aculeata)		Vol 6 Pt 3b	1980	Richards, O.W.	118
Formicidae		Vol 6 Pt 3c	1975	Bolton, B.; Collingwood, C.A.	34
Spider wasps (Pompilidae)		Vol 6 Pt 4	1988	Day, M.C.	
Hymenoptera: Cuckoo wasps (Chrysididae)		Vol 6 Pt 5	1984	Morgan, D.	37
Hymenoptera: The Vespoid Wasps		Vol 6 Pt 6	2014	Archer, M.	82

=== Vol : 7 - Hymenoptera: Ichneumonoidea ===
Title	Edition	Vol	Date	Auth	Pages
Pimpline ichneumon-flies (Ichneumonidae: Pimplinae)		Vol 7 Pt 1	1988	Fitton, M. G., M. R. Shaw & I. D. Gauld	110
Ichneumonidae- key to subfamilies and Ichneumoninae (except Ichneumonini)		Vol 7 Pt 2ai	1959	Perkins, J.F.	116
Ichneumonidae- Ichneumoninae (Ichneumonini), Alomyinae, Agriotypinae and Lycorininae		Vol 7 Pt 2aii	1960	Perkins, J.F.	96
Ichneumonidae- Orthopelmatinae and Anomaloninae		Vol 7 Pt 2b	1977	Gauld, I.D. & Mitchell, P.A.	32
The Banchine Wasps (Ichneumonidae: Banchinae) of the British Isles		Vol 7 Pt 4	2017	Brock, J.P.	150
Classification and Biology of Braconid Wasps (Hymenoptera: Braconidae)		Vol 7 Pt 11	1991	Shaw, M.R.; Huddleston, T.	126
Ichneumonid Wasps (Hymenoptera: Ichneumonidae): their Classification and Biology		Vol 7 Pt 12	2018	Broad, G.R.; Shaw, M.R.; Fitton, M.G.	424

=== Vol : 8 - Hymenoptera: Cynipoidea, Chalcidoidea & Proctotrupoidea ===
Title	Edition	Vol	Date	Auth	Pages
Cynipoidea- key to families and subfamilies and Cynipidae (Cynipinae)		Vol 8 Pt 1a	1963	Eady, R.D. & Quinlan, J.	81
Cynipoidea-Eucoilidae		Vol 8 Pt 1b	1978	Quinlan, J.	58
Cynipoidea - Charipidae, Ibaliidae & Figitidae		Vol 8 Pt 1c	1986	Fergusson, N.D.M.	55
Chalcidoidea - Chalcidoidea		Vol 8 Pt 2a	1968	Ferriere, C.; Kerrich, G.J.	40
Chalcidoidea - Elasmidae & Eulophidae		Vol 8 Pt 2b	1968	Askew, R.R.	39
Proctotrupoidea - Diapriidae (Diapriinae)		Vol 8 Pt 3di	1980	Nixon, G.E.J.	55
Proctotrupoidea - Diapriidae (Belytinae)		Vol 8 Pt 3dii	1957	Nixon, G.E.J.	107

=== Vol : 9 - Diptera: Nematocera & Brachycera ===
Title	Edition	Vol	Date	Auth	Pages
Diptera. Introduction and key to families	1st	Vol 9 Pt 1	1949	Oldroyd, H.	49
Diptera. Introduction and key to families	2nd	Vol 9 Pt 1	1954	Oldroyd, H.	49
Diptera. Introduction and key to families	3rd	Vol 9 Pt 1	1970	Oldroyd, H.	104
Tipulidae to Chironomidae		Vol 9 Pt 2	1950	Coe, R.L, Freeman, P. & Mattingly, P.F.	216
Mycetophilidae (Bolitophilinae, Ditomyiinae, Diadocidiinae, Keroplatinae, Sciophilinae & Manotinae)		Vol 9 Pt 3	1980	Hutson, A.M.; Ackland, D.M.; Kidd, L.N.	111
Tabanoidea and Asiloidea		Vol 9 Pt 4	1969	Oldroyd, H.	132
Dolichopodidae		Vol 9 Pt 5	1978	d'Assis-Fonseca, E.C.M.	90
Sciarid flies (Sciaridae)		Vol 9 Pt 6	1983	Freeman, P.	68
Scatopsidae & Bibionidae		Vol 9 Pt 7	1985	Freeman, P.; Lane, R.P	74
Fungus gnats (Diptera:Mycetophilidae, Mycetophilinae)		Vol 9 Pt 8	2022	Chandler, P.	398

=== Vol : 10 - Diptera: Cyclorrhapha ===
Title	Edition	Vol	Date	Auth	Pages
Syrphidae		Vol 10 Pt 1	1953	Coe, R.L.	98
Lonchopteridae		Vol 10 Pt 2ai	1969	Smith, K.G.V.	9
Pipunculidae		Vol 10 Pt 2c	1966	Coe, R.L.	83
Conopidae		Vol 10 Pt 3a	1969	Smith, K.G.V.	19
Tachinidae and Calliphoridae		Vol 10 Pt 4a	1954	van Emden, F.I.	133
Tachinidae		Vol 10 Pt 4ai	1993	Belshaw, R.	170
Muscidae		Vol 10 Pt 4b	1968	d'Assis-Fonseca, E.C.M.	118
Tephritid Flies		Vol 10 Pt 5a	1988	White, I. M.	134
Sepsidae		Vol 10 Pt 5c	1979	Pont, A.C.	35
Lesser dung flies (Sphaeroceridae)		Vol 10 Pt 5e	1988	Pitkin, B.R.	175
Agromyzidae		Vol 10 Pt 5g	1972	Spencer, K.A.	136
Scuttle flies (Phoridae, except Megaselia)		Vol 10 Pt 6	1983	Disney, R.H.L	81
Keds, flat-flies & bat-flies (Hippoboscidae & Nycteribiidae)		Vol 10 Pt 7	1984	Hutson, A.M	84
Scuttle-flies (Megaselia)		Vol 10 Pt 8	1989	Disney, R.H.L	155
Immature stages of British flies		Vol 10 Pt 14	1989	Smith, K.G.V.	80
British Lonchaeidae		Vol 10 Pt 15	2008	MacGowan & Rotheray	142
Blow Flies (Diptera: Calliphoridae, Polleniidae, Rhiniidae)		Vol 10 Pt 16	2021	Sivell, Olga	206

=== Vol : 11 & 12 - Checklists of British Insects ===
Title	Edition	Vol	Date	Auth	Pages
Checklist of British Insects, pt. 1: Small Orders and Hemiptera		Vol 11 Pt 1	1964	Kloet, G.S.; Hincks, W.D.	xv, 119
Checklist: Lepidoptera		Vol 11 Pt 2	1972	Kloet, G.S.; Hincks, W.D	viii, 153
Checklist: Coleoptera and Strepsiptera		Vol 11 Pt 3	1977	Pope, R.D	xiv, 105
Checklist: Hymenoptera		Vol 11 Pt 4	1978	Kloet, G.S.; Hincks, W.D.; Fitton, M.G. et al.	x, 159.
Checklist: Diptera & Siphonaptera		Vol 11 Pt 5	1976	Kloet, G.S.; Hincks, W.D.	ix, 139
Checklist: Diptera		Vol 12 Pt 1	1998	Chandler, Peter J.	234
The Staphylinidae (rove beetles) of Britain and Ireland: Part 5. Scaphidiinae, Piestinae, Oxytelinae		Vol 12 Pt 5	2009	Lott, Derek A.	100
Checklist of the Lepidoptera of the British Isles		Vol 12 Pt 6	2013	Agassiz, David JL. Beavan, Stella D & Heckford, Robert J	206
The Staphylinidae (rove beetles) of Britain and Ireland: Parts 7 and 8. Oxyporinae, Steninae, Euaesthetinae, Pseudopsinae, Paederinae, Staphylininae		Vol 12 Pt 7-8	2011	Lott, Derek A.	340

== Similar publications ==
Analogous publications exist in other countries. An equivalent identification key, Klucze do oznaczania owadów Polski (‘Keys for the identification of Polish insects’), exists in Poland. In France a multivolume series, Faune de France (‘Fauna of France’), covers the insects among other animal groups.
