= Royal Entomological Society =

British learned society

The Royal Entomological Society
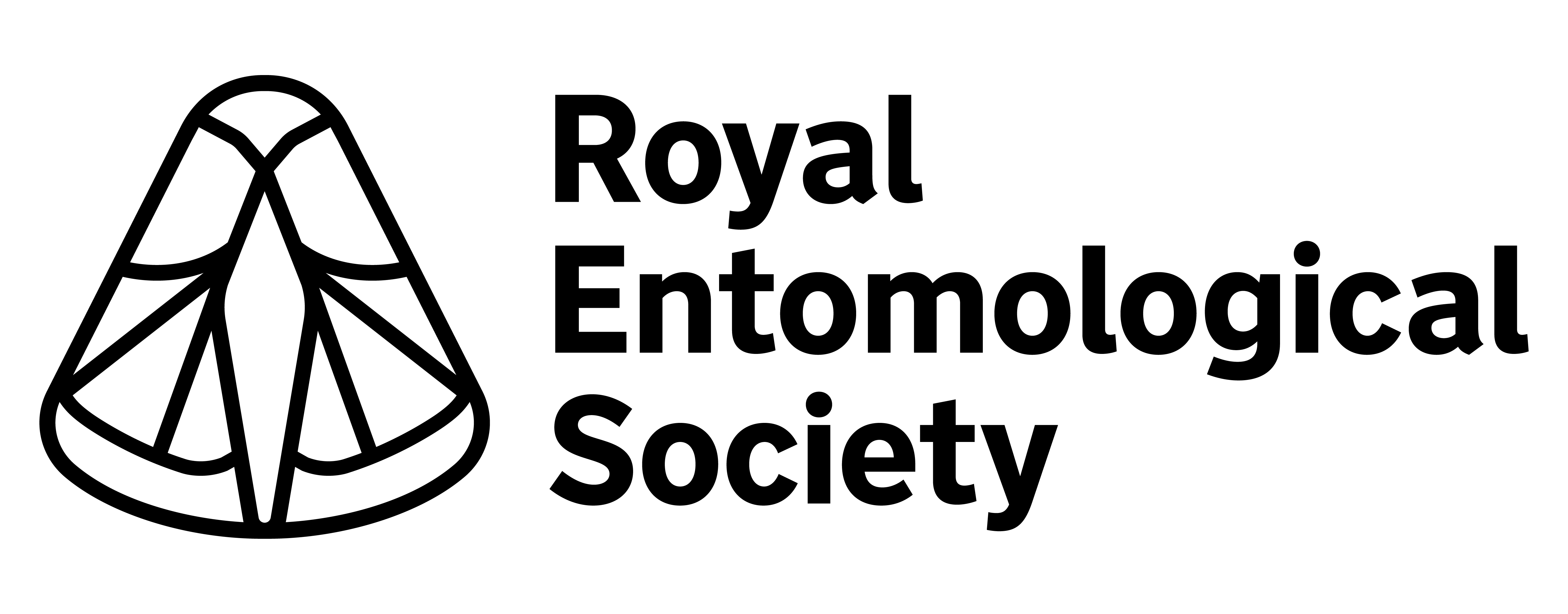
- Formation: 1833; 193 years ago (royal charter: 1885)
- Type: Learned society
- Headquarters: London, England
- President: Allan Watt
- Staff: 16
- Website: www.royensoc.co.uk

The Royal Entomological Society is a learned society devoted to the study of insects. It aims to disseminate information about insects and to improve communication between entomologists.

The society was founded in 1833 as the Entomological Society of London. It had many antecedents beginning as the Society of Entomologists of London.

== History ==
The foundation of the society began with a meeting of "gentlemen and friends of entomological science", held on 3 May 1833 in the British Museum convened by Nicholas Aylward Vigors with the presidency of John George Children. Those present were the Reverend Frederick William Hope, Cardale Babington, William Yarrell, John Edward Gray, James Francis Stephens, Thomas Horsfield, George Thomas Rudd and George Robert Gray. Letters of Adrian Hardy Haworth, George Bennett and John Curtis were read where they expressed their regrets to be unable to attend the meeting.

They decided that a society should be created for the promotion of the science of entomology in its various branches and it should be called the Entomological Society of London. J. G. Children, F. W. Hope, J. F. Stephens, W. Yarrell and G. Rudd were elected to form a committee, with G. R. Gray as secretary. J. G. Children became the first president and William Kirby (1759–1850) was made honorary president for life. The real date of the foundation of the society was more probably on 22 May 1833, when the members met in Thatched House Tavern, on St James's Street. During this meeting, George Robert Waterhouse (1810–1888) was elected librarian and curator of the insects and records. As of this meeting, foreign honorary members were elected: Johann Cristoph Friedrich Klug (1775–1856), Wilhem de Haan (1801–1855), Victor Audouin (1797–1841), Johann Ludwig Christian Gravenhorst (1777–1857), Christian Rudolph Wilhelm Wiedemann (1770–1840), Carl Eduard Hammerschmidt (1800–1874) and Alexandre Louis Lefèbvre de Cérisy (1798–1867). William Blandell Spence (1813–1900) received the task of maintaining of the relations with continental entomologists.

The society started to assemble a library, an early addition being the personal library of Adrian Hardy Haworth (1767–1833), purchased by John Obadiah Westwood (1805–1893) on behalf of the society. The insect collection also increased.

In September 1834, the society numbered 117 honorary members and 10 full members. Women were allowed membership and benefited from the same rights as the men. A publication commenced in November 1834 under the title Transactions of the Entomological Society of London.

Secretary G. R. Gray resigned in the same year then and was replaced by J. O. Westwood. Under the impulse of this last entomologist, who had many functions, the society made great strides. It was in particular attended regularly by Charles Darwin (1809–1882) on his return from the voyage on H.M.S. Beagle: he became a member of the council and vice-president in 1838. J. O. Westwood left his functions in 1848 and was replaced by Edward Doubleday (1810–1849) and William Frederick Evans. They in their turn were soon replaced. In 1849, a secretary charged to collect the minutes of the meetings was named in the person of John William Douglas (1814–1905), a position he kept until 1856. He was assisted in 1851–1852 by Henry Tibbats Stainton (1822–1892), in 1853-1854 by William Wing (1827–1855), in 1855-1856 by Edwin Shepherd who then replaced J.W. Douglas in his position. Edward Wesley Janson (1822–91), a natural history agent, publisher and entomologist was Curator of the Entomological Society collections from 1850 to 1863 and librarian from 1863 to 1874.

Edward Mason Janson (1847–1880) took over the post of curator from Frederick Smith (1805–1879) who then left to work in the British Museum. H. T. Stainton, who was involved more and more in the life of the society, seemed to have some problems working with E. M. Janson. He was replaced by W. Wing in 1852. In this year, the society moved from its building at 17, Old Bond Street to 12, Bedford Row. The following year, three of the four most responsible for the society were replaced: Edward Newman (1801–1876) took the place of J. O. Westwood as president, Samuel Stevens (1817–1899) took the place of W. Yarrell as treasurer and W. Wing the place of H. T. Stainton as secretary.

In 1885 Queen Victoria granted the society its royal charter. In 1933, the society's centenary year, King George V granted it the privilege of adding the word "Royal" to its title, making it the Royal Entomological Society.

== Structure and activities ==
The society's patron was Her Majesty The Queen and its vice-patron is The Earl of Selborne. The society is governed by its council, which is chaired by the society's president, according to a set of by-laws. The members of council, the president and the other officers are elected from the society's fellowship and membership. The aim of the Royal Entomological Society is the improvement and diffusion of entomological science. This is achieved through publications, scientific meetings, supporting and funding entomological expeditions, and public events. The society maintains an entomological library at its headquarters in St Albans, UK. and convenes over 15 special interest groups, covering a range of scientific fields within entomology.

With the support of over 60 partner organisations, the society organises Insect Week, an annual initiative to engage the public with the importance of insects and entomology, through hundreds of events and activities across the UK. The society has also organised Insect Festivals, a series of one day events in York and Bristol celebrating insects and entomology. In 2016 the society held the EntoSci conference EntoSci16 with Harper Adams University to promote entomology to 14 to 18 year olds, and again in 2018.

In 2022 the society announced it would sponsor a garden at the 2023 RHS Chelsea Flower Show with the charity Project Giving Back, the garden will be designed by Tom Massey and will have habitats for different types of insects and a laboratory to study them. At the show the garden won a Silver-gilt medal and was built by Landscape Associates. The garden was relocated to Stratford Cross in East London in opened to the public in Summer 2024.

The society engages with policy makers, in 2023 it published a peer-reviewed paper Grand Challenges in Entomology, identifying high priority challenges for the future of insect science. The society submitted evidence to the UK Parliament Science, Innovation and Technology Committee's report on Insect decline and UK food security, published in March 2024.

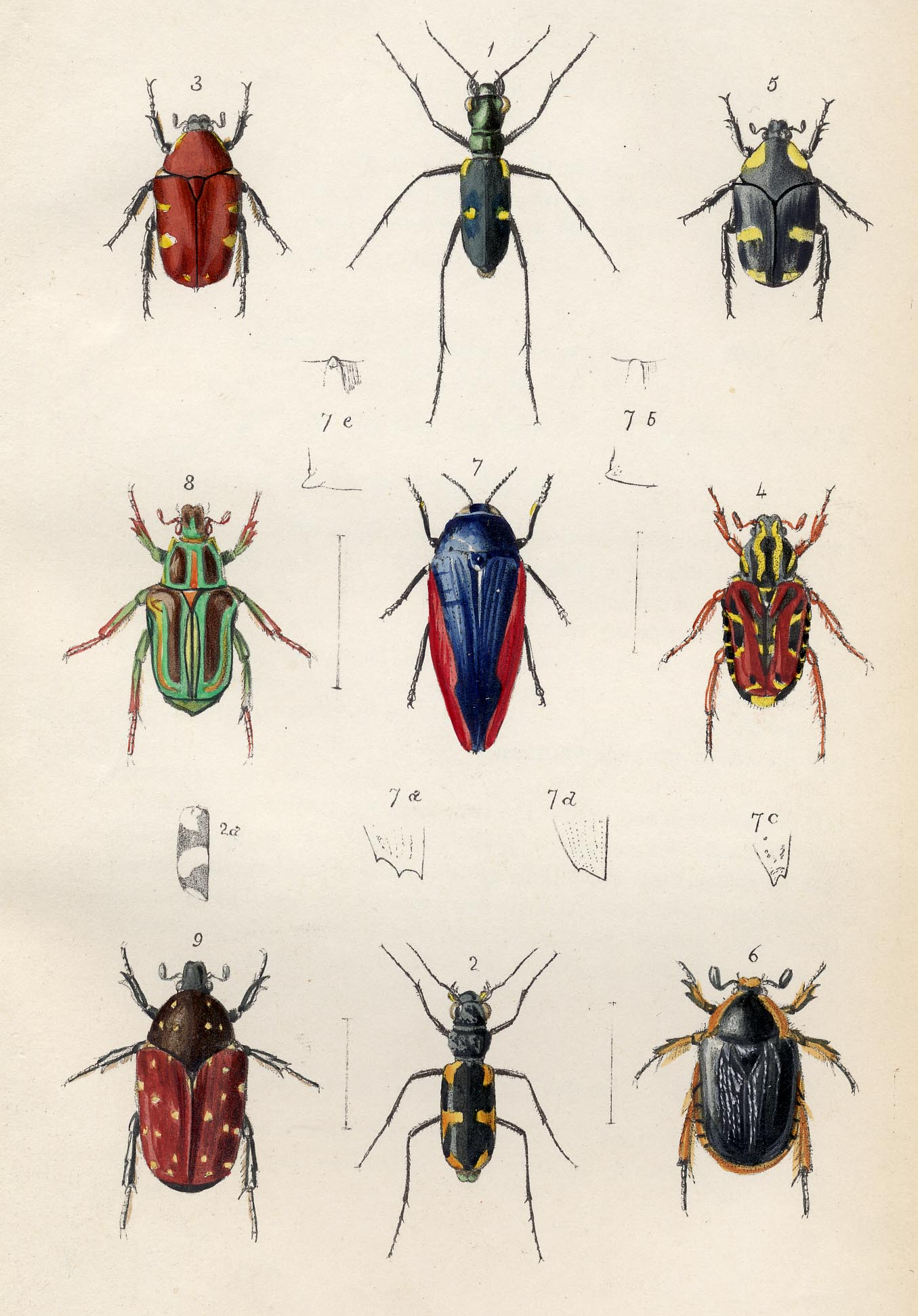
Plate from Transactions of the Entomological Society for 1848

== Publications ==
The society publishes seven scientific journals in partnership with Wiley:

- Agricultural and Forest Entomology
- Ecological Entomology
- Insect Conservation and Diversity
- Insect Molecular Biology
- Medical and Veterinary Entomology
- Physiological Entomology
- Systematic Entomology

Members and fellows receive the quarterly entomological news journal Antenna.

The society also publishes a series of handbooks on the identification of insects. The aim of these handbooks is to provide illustrated identification keys to the insects of Britain, together with concise morphological, biological and distributional information. The series also includes several Check Lists of British Insects. All books contain line drawings, with the most recent volumes including colour photographs. In recent years, new volumes in the series have been published by Field Studies Council, and benefit from association with the AIDGAP identification guides and Synopses of the British Fauna. In 2023 the society announced a new publishing partnership with CABI for the handbooks.

The society has also published general interest books about insects. In 2011 The Royal Entomological Society Book of British Insects was published with Wiley-Blackwell, aiming to summarise all of the then 558 taxonomic families of British insects, and in 2015 published Minibeast Magic:How to Catch Invertebrates with Tricks and Treats by Roma Oxford. In 2023 the society partnered with Bonnier books on Insectarium by Prof. Dave Goulson and published RES Insects with DK, written by over 80 members of the society and covering over 300 insect species.

== Fellowship ==
The Royal Entomological Society has an international membership and invites applications for Fellowship from those who have made a substantial contribution to entomology, through publications or other evidence of achievement. Applications are referred to a Committee of Council, who then forward a recommendation to Council. Fellows are entitled to make use of the title "Fellow of the Royal Entomological Society" and the suffix "FRES" may be regarded as an academic qualification.

== Awards ==
The RES gives out awards to recognise contribution to entomology. These include:

- Wigglesworth Memorial Lecture and Award, for outstanding services to entomology.
- Honorary Fellowship, for lifetime achievement in insect science.
- Early Career Entomologist Award, for exceptional early career contribution to insect science.
- J. O. Westwood Medal, for excellence in insect taxonomy.
- Insect Conservation Award, for outstanding contribution to insect conservation.
- Eleanor Ormerod Award, for outstanding application and practice of entomology.
- Journal Awards, for the best papers published in each of the RES journals.
- Alfred Russel Wallace Award, for an outstanding insect doctorate thesis.
- Teaching Awards, for outstanding entomology teaching.
- Student Award, for science communication to the general public.

== Badge ==
Original Royal Entomological Society badge

On the foundation of the Entomological Society in 1833 William Kirby was made Honorary Life President and Stylops melittae (then known as Stylops kirbyi) was adopted as the society's symbol. The seal was first used for a letter by the society to William Kirby, which was signed by the President and 30 members in 1836 to thank him for presenting the society with a cabinet containing his entire insect collection. William Kirby was responsible for classifying the Strepsiptera as a separate order. The society's badge has remained almost unchanged since its first use until the Society's rebrand in 2022.

== Officers ==
=== Honorary life Presidents ===
- 1833–1850: William Kirby
- 1883–1893: John Obadiah Westwood
- 1933–1943: Edward Bagnall Poulton

=== Presidents ===
The following persons have been presidents of the society:

- 1833–1834: John George Children
- 1835–1836: Frederick William Hope
- 1837–1838: James Francis Stephens
- 1839–1840: Frederick William Hope
- 1841–1842: William Wilson Saunders
- 1843–1844: George Newport
- 1845–1846: Frederick William Hope
- 1847–1848: William Spence
- 1849–1850: George Robert Waterhouse
- 1852–1853: John Obadiah Westwood
- 1853–1854: Edward Newman
- 1855–1856: John Curtis
- 1856–1857: William Wilson Saunders
- 1858–1859: John Edward Gray
- 1860–1861: John William Douglas
- 1862–1863: Frederick Smith
- 1864–1865: Francis Polkinghorne Pascoe
- 1866–1867: John Lubbock, 1st Baron Avebury
- 1868–1869: Henry Walter Bates
- 1870–1871: Alfred Russel Wallace
- 1872–1873: John Obadiah Westwood
- 1874–1875: Sidney Smith Saunders
- 1876–1877: John Obadiah Westwood
- 1878: Henry Walter Bates
- 1879–1880: John Lubbock, 1st Baron Avebury
- 1881–1882: Henry Tibbats Stainton
- 1883–1884: Joseph William Dunning
- 1885–1886: Robert McLachlan
- 1887–1888: David Sharp
- 1889–1890: Lord Thomas de Grey Walsingham
- 1891–1892: Frederick DuCane Godman
- 1893–1894: Henry John Elwes
- 1895–1896: Raphael Meldola
- 1897–1898: Roland Trimen
- 1899–1900: George Henry Verrall
- 1901–1902: William Weekes Fowler
- 1903–1904: Edward Bagnall Poulton
- 1905–1906: Frederick Merrifield
- 1907–1908: Charles Owen Waterhouse
- 1909–1910: Frederick Augustus Dixey
- 1911–1912: Francis David Morice
- 1913–1914: George Thomas Bethune-Baker
- 1915–1916: Nathaniel Charles Rothschild
- 1917–1918: Charles Joseph Gahan
- 1919–1920: James John Walker
- 1921–1922: Lionel Walter Rothschild
- 1923–1924: Edward Ernest Green
- 1925–1926: Edward Bagnall Poulton
- 1927–1928: James Edward Collin
- 1929–1930: Karl Jordan
- 1931–1932: Harry Eltringham
- 1933–1934: Edward Bagnall Poulton
- 1934–1935: Sheffield Airey Neave
- 1936–1937: Augustus Daniel Imms
- 1938–1939: John Claud Fortescue Fryer
- 1940–1941: Kenneth Gloyne Blair
- 1942–1943: Patrick Alfred Buxton
- 1943–1944: Edward Alfred Cockayne
- 1945–1946: Geoffrey Douglas Hale Carpenter
- 1947–1948: Carrington Bonsor Williams
- 1949–1950: Sir Vincent Brian Wigglesworth
- 1951–1952: Norman Denbigh Riley
- 1953–1954: Patrick Alfred Buxton
- 1955–1956: Wilfrid John Hall
- 1957–1958: Owain Westmacott Richards
- 1959–1960: Boris Petrovitch Uvarov
- 1961–1962: George Copley Varley
- 1963–1964: Sir Vincent Brian Wigglesworth
- 1965–1966: Eric Omar Pearson
- 1967–1968: John Stodart Kennedy
- 1969–1970: Howard Everest Hinton
- 1971–1972: Colin Gasking Butler
- 1973–1974: Anthony David Lees
- 1975–1976: Donald Livingston Gunn
- 1977–1978: John David Gillett
- 1979–1980: Reginald Charles Rainey
- 1981–1982: Helmut Fritz van Emden
- 1983–1984: Sir Thomas Richard Edmund Southwood
- 1985–1986: Trevor Lewis
- 1987–1988: Victor Frank Eastop
- 1989–1990: Jack P. Dempster
- 1991–1992: Sir Cyril Astley Clarke
- 1993–1994: Miriam Louisa Rothschild
- 1995–1996: Richard Lane
- 1997–1998: Walter M. Blaney
- 1999–2000: Roger L. Blackman
- 2001–2002: Michael Frederick Claridge
- 2002–2004: Christopher Peter Haines
- 2004–2006: Hugh David Loxdale
- 2006–2008: Jim Hardie
- 2008–2010: Linda M. Field
- 2010–2012: Stuart Edward Reynolds
- 2012–2014: Jeremy A. Thomas
- 2014–2016: John A. Pickett
- 2016–2018: Michael Hassell
- 2018–2020: Chris D. Thomas
- 2020–2022: Helen Roy
- 2022–2024: Jane Hill
- 2024-2026: Jane Stout
- 2026- : Allan Watt

== See also ==
- Fellows of the Royal Entomological Society (of London)
- Royal Entomological Society Handbooks
