= List of presidents of the Cambridge Union =

This is a list of presidents of the Cambridge Union since its foundation in 1815.

== 1815–1916 ==
Year	Term	President	College
1815	Lent	Mr E. Gambier	Trinity
1815	Easter	Lord Normanby	Trinity
1815	Michaelmas	The Hon. C. J. Shore	Trinity
1816	Lent	Mr G. Stainforth (Note: George Stainforth, born 9 March 1796; Chancellor's Medal, 1818; died 24 August 1820, aged 24; brother of Francis John Stainforth (from Alumni Cantabrigienses).)	Trinity
1816	Easter	Mr E. Leycester	St John's
1816	Michaelmas	Mr R. Whitcombe (Note: Richard Whitcombe, born 2 March 1794; Scholar 1815; BA 1817, MA 1820; Lincoln's Inn, 1820, called to the bar; died 12 November 1834 (from Alumni Cantabrigienses))	Trinity
1817	Lent	Mr W. Whewell	Trinity
1817	Easter	Mr C. Thirlwall	Trinity
1817	Michaelmas	Mr H. J. Rose	Trinity
1818	Lent	Mr B. H. Malkin	Trinity
1818	Easter	Mr T. Thorp	Trinity
1818	Michaelmas	Mr T. Baines	Trinity
1819	Lent	Mr T. Platt	Trinity
1819	Easter	Mr S. Hawkes	Trinity
1819	Michaelmas	Mr J. Cooper	Trinity
1820	Lent	Mr E. D. Rhodes	Sidney Sussex
1820	Easter	Mr E. Whiteley	Jesus
1820	Michaelmas	Mr T. Sheepshanks	Trinity
1821	Lent	Mr E. Strutt	Trinity
1821	Easter	Mr J. Punnett	Clare
1821	Michaelmas	Mr J. Furnival	Queens'
1822	Lent	Mr C. Austin	Jesus
1822	Easter	Mr C. Villiers	St John's
1822	Michaelmas	Mr W. H. Ord	Trinity
1823	Lent	Mr W. Blunt	King's
1823	Easter	Mr G. O. Townsend	King's
1823	Michaelmas	Mr J. J. Rawlinson	Trinity
1824	Lent	Mr R. C. Hildyard	St Catharine's
1824	Easter	Mr A. J. Cockburn	Trinity Hall
1824	Michaelmas	Mr J. Haughton	Pembroke
1825	Lent	Mr W. E. Tooke	Trinity
1825	Easter	Mr B. H. Kennedy	St John's
1825	Michaelmas	Mr J. Stock	Peterhouse
1826	Lent	Mr J. Wilson	Trinity
1826	Easter	Mr J. H. Smith	Corpus Christi
1826	Michaelmas	Mr C. Lillingston	Emmanuel
1827	Lent	Mr C. Buller	Trinity
1827	Easter	Mr J. Sterling	Trinity Hall
1827	Michaelmas	Mr S. H. Walpole	Trinity
1828	Lent	Mr J. Kemble	Trinity
1828	Easter	Mr R. C. Trench	Trinity
1828	Michaelmas	Mr H. H. Luscombe	Clare
1829	Lent	Mr J. W. Blakesley	Corpus Christi
1829	Easter	Mr C. Chapman	Corpus Christi
1829	Michaelmas	Mr P. H. Crutchley	Magdalene
1830	Lent	Mr L. S. Orde	Queens'
1830	Easter	Mr H. Matthew	Sidney Sussex
1830	Michaelmas	Mr L. S. Orde*	Queens'
1831	Lent	Mr W. S. O'Brien	Trinity
1831	Easter	Mr J. W. D. Dundas	Magdalene
1831	Michaelmas	Mr W. H. Brookfield	Trinity
1832	Lent	Mr C. R. Kennedy	Trinity
1832	Easter	Mr H. Alford	Trinity
1832	Michaelmas	Mr R. A. Johnstone	Trinity
1833	Lent	Hon. C. W. Henniker	St John's
1833	Easter	Mr E. Warburton	Trinity
1833	Michaelmas	Mr J. E. Heathcote	Trinity
1834	Lent	Mr W. H. Brookfield*	Trinity
1834	Lent	Hon. W. C. Henniker*	St John's
1834	Easter	Mr C. White	Magdalene
1834	Michaelmas	Mr C. G. Burke	Christ's
1835	Lent	Mr G. F. Townsend	Trinity
1835	Easter	Mr K. Macaulay	Jesus
1835	Michaelmas	Mr W. A. Mackinnon	St John's
1836	Lent	Mr W. F. Pollock	Trinity
1836	Easter	Mr T. Spankie	Trinity
1836	Michaelmas	Mr H. R. Goldfinch	Trinity
1837	Lent	Mr A. Baillie-Cochrane	Trinity
1837	Easter	Mr A. J. Ellis	Trinity
1837	Michaelmas	Mr R. N. Philipps	Christ's
1838	Lent	Mr C. J. Tindal	Trinity
1838	Easter	Sir J. Lighton	St John's
1838	Michaelmas	Mr S. T. Bartlett	Clare
1839	Lent	Mr A. J. B. Hope	Trinity
1839	Lent	Mr J. W. Donaldson	Trinity
1839	Easter	Mr C. J. Ellicott	St John's
1839	Michaelmas	Mr E. H. J. Craufurd	Trinity
1840	Lent	Mr J. H. Bastard	Trinity
1840	Easter	Mr W. Werge	St John's
1840	Michaelmas	Mr J. A. Beaumont	Trinity
1841	Lent	Mr J. R. Stock	St John's
1841	Easter	Mr W. Cunliffe-Brooks	St John's
1841	Michaelmas	Mr T. H. Bullock	King's
1842	Lent	Mr E. Rudge	St Catharine's
1842	Lent	Mr G. Crawshay	Trinity
1842	Easter	Mr J. Hardcastle	Peterhouse
1842	Michaelmas	Mr T. S. Western	Trinity
1843	Lent	Mr F. W. Gibbs	Trinity
1843	Easter	The Hon. F. S. Grimston	Magdalene
1843	Michaelmas	Mr G. W. King	Trinity
1844	Lent	Mr J. C. H. Ogier	Trinity
1844	Easter	Mr W. Blake	Trinity
1844	Michaelmas	Mr E. F. Fiske	Emmanuel
1845	Lent	Mr C. Babington	St John's
1845	Easter	Mr H. Lindsay	Trinity
1845	Michaelmas	Mr R. A. Cross	Trinity
1846	Lent	Mr J. F. Baird	Trinity
1846	Easter	Mr T. Dealtry	Trinity
1846	Michaelmas	Mr A. Garfit	Trinity
1847	Lent	The Hon. W. F. Campbell	Trinity
1847	Easter	Mr J. Ll. Davies	Trinity
1847	Michaelmas	Mr A. A. Vansittart	Trinity
1848	Lent	Mr R. H. Parr	Trinity
1848	Easter	Mr J. F. Thrupp	Trinity
1848	Michaelmas	Mr F. H. Colt	Trinity
1849	Lent	The Hon. A. Gordon	Trinity
1849	Easter	Mr W. V. Harcourt	Trinity
1849	Michaelmas	Mr J. Ll. Davies*	Trinity
1850	Lent	Mr A. H. Louis	Trinity
1850	Easter	Mr R. Temple	Trinity
1850	Michaelmas	Mr R. Stuart Lane	Gonville and Caius
1851	Lent	Mr H. Leach	Emmanuel
1851	Easter	Mr P. Laurence	Trinity
1851	Michaelmas	Mr H. A. Bright	Trinity
1852	Lent	Mr R. J. Cust	Trinity
1852	Easter	Mr J. Payn	Trinity
1852	Michaelmas	Mr F. J. A. Hort	Trinity
1853	Lent	Mr J. Lloyd	Trinity
1853	Easter	Mr A. Cohen	Magdalene
1853	Michaelmas	Mr E. Dicey	Trinity
1854	Lent	Mr C. T. Swanston	Trinity
1854	Easter	Mr H. W. Elphinstone	Trinity
1854	Michaelmas	Mr V. Lushington	Trinity
1855	Lent	Mr F. Kelly	Trinity
1855	Easter	Mr W. C. Gully	Trinity
1855	Michaelmas	Mr H. M. Butler	Trinity
1856	Lent	Mr W. D. Gardiner	Peterhouse
1856	Easter	Mr J. W. Dunning	Trinity
1856	Michaelmas	Mr E. E. Bowen	Trinity
1857	Lent	Mr C. Puller	Trinity
1857	Easter	Mr J. E. Gorst	St John's
1857	Michaelmas	Mr W. S. Smith	Trinity
1858	Lent	Mr C. A. Jones	St John's
1858	Easter	Mr R. O'Hara	Gonville & Caius
1858	Michaelmas	Mr E. H. Fisher	Trinity
1859	Lent	Mr H. C. Raikes	Trinity
1859	Easter	Mr O. Browning	King's
1859	Michaelmas	Mr T. W. Beddome	Trinity
1860	Lent	Mr C. Trotter	Trinity
1860	Easter	Mr H. Geary	Corpus Christi
1860	Michaelmas	Sir G. Young, Bart	Trinity
1861	Lent	Mr H. Sidgwick	Trinity
1861	Easter	Mr F. Ll. Bagshawe	Trinity
1861	Michaelmas	Mr G. O. Trevelyan	Trinity
1862	Lent	Mr W. M. Lane	Trinity
1862	Easter	Mr W. J. Lawrance	Trinity
1862	Michaelmas	Mr W. Everett	Trinity
1863	Lent	Mr E. L. O'Malley	Trinity
1863	Easter	Mr E. L. O'Malley*	Trinity
1863	Michaelmas	Mr A. Sidgwick	Trinity
1864	Lent	Mr R. D. Bennett	Trinity Hall
1864	Easter	Mr H. Jackson	Trinity
1864	Michaelmas	Mr C. W. Dilke	Trinity Hall
1865	Lent	Mr H. Peto	Trinity
1865	Easter	Mr J. R. Hollond	Trinity
1865	Michaelmas	Mr E. S. Shuckburgh	Emmanuel
1866	Lent	Mr C. W. Dilke*	Trinity Hall
1866	Easter	Lord E. Fitzmaurice	Trinity
1866	Michaelmas	Mr H. L. Anderton	Gonville & Caius
1867	Lent	Mr W. R. Kennedy	King's
1867	Easter	Mr W. A. Lindsay	Trinity
1867	Michaelmas	Mr G. C. Whiteley	St John's
1868	Lent	Mr A. S. Wilkins	St John's
1868	Easter	Mr J. F. Moulton	St Johns
1868	Michaelmas	Mr E. A. Owen	Trinity
1869	Lent	Mr R. T. Wright	Christ's
1869	Easter	Mr Frank Watson	St John's
1869	Michaelmas	Mr J. Kennedy	King's
1870	Lent	Mr G. Warington	Gonville & Caius
1870	Easter	Mr A. Foster	St John's
1870	Michaelmas	Mr J. E. Symes	Downing
1871	Lent	Mr W. B. Odgers	Trinity Hall
1871	Easter	Mr J. de Soyres	Gonville & Caius
1871	Michaelmas	Mr C. G. Kellner	King's
1872	Lent	Mr W. F. MacMichael	Downing
1872	Easter	Mr W. Cunningham	Trinity
1872	Michaelmas	Mr T. O. Harding	Trinity
1873	Lent	Mr F. W. Maitland	Trinity
1873	Easter	Mr W. J. Scott	Trinity
1873	Michaelmas	Mr A. W. Verrall	Trinity
1874	Lent	Mr C. S. Kenny	Downing
1874	Easter	Mr P. M. Laurence	Corpus Christi
1874	Michaelmas	Mr R. W. Jameson	Trinity
1875	Lent	Mr J. E. C. Munro	Downing
1875	Easter	Mr H. N. Martin	Christ's
1875	Michaelmas	Mr J. F. Skipper	St John's
1876	Lent	Mr J. E. C. Welldon	King's
1876	Easter	Mr J. F. Little	Downing
1876	Michaelmas	Mr R. C. Lehmann	Trinity
1877	Lent	The Hon. H. N. Waldegrave	Trinity
1877	Easter	Mr J. F. Main	Trinity
1877	Michaelmas	The Rev. A. G. Tweedie	Gonville & Caius
1878	Lent	Mr T. D. Hart	Downing
1878	Easter	Mr W. B. Milton	Trinity
1878	Michaelmas	Mr T. R. Hughes	Trinity
1879	Lent	Mr E. J. C. Morton	St John's
1879	Easter	Mr F. P. Lefroy	Trinity
1879	Michaelmas	Mr S. G. Ponsonby	Trinity
1880	Lent	Mr T. E. Scrutton	Trinity
1880	Easter	Mr J. P. Whitney	King's
1880	Michaelmas	Mr J. K. Stephen	King's
1881	Lent	Mr N. C. Hardcastle	Downing
1881	Easter	Mr Harold Cox	Jesus
1881	Michaelmas	Mr E. A. Parkyn	Christ's
1882	Lent	Mr O. Rigby	St John's
1882	Easter	Mr T. Beck	Trinity
1882	Michaelmas	Sir J. Peiris	St John's
1883	Lent	Mr F. L. Lucas	Trinity
1883	Easter	Mr J. R. Tanner	St John's
1883	Michaelmas	Mr G. S. W. Jebb	Trinity
1884	Lent	Mr W. Blain	St John's
1884	Easter	Mr W. H. Stables	Trinity
1884	Michaelmas	Mr W. A. Raleigh	King's
1885	Lent	The Hon. W. G. Scott	Trinity
1885	Easter	Mr E. A. Goulding	St John's
1885	Michaelmas	Mr J. T. Bell	Trinity Hall
1886	Lent	Mr E. J. Griffith	Downing
1886	Easter	Mr L. J. Maxse	King's
1886	Michaelmas	Mr H. Boyd-Carpenter	King's
1887	Lent	Mr L. G. B. J. Ford	King's
1887	Easter	Mr F. E. Garrett	Trinity
1887	Michaelmas	Count Strickland	Trinity
1888	Lent	Mr W. W. Grantham	Trinity
1888	Easter	Mr R. R. Ottley	Trinity
1888	Michaelmas	Mr R. J. Wilkinson	Trinity
1889	Lent	Mr F. H. Maugham	Trinity Hall
1889	Easter	Mr C. H. Bompas	Trinity
1889	Michaelmas	The Rev. E. Grose Hodge	Trinity Hall
1890	Lent	Mr W. E. Brunyate	Trinity
1890	Easter	The Hon. M. M. Macnaghten	Trinity
1890	Michaelmas	Mr J. E. McTaggart	Trinity
1891	Lent	Mr S. R. C. Bosanquet	Trinity
1891	Easter	Mr E. W. MacBride	St John's
1891	Michaelmas	Mr R. F. Graham Campbell	Trinity
1892	Lent	Mr H. W. L. O'Rorke	Trinity
1892	Easter	Mr T. A. Bertram	Gonville & Caius
1892	Michaelmas	Mr G. Davidson Kempt	St John's
1893	Lent	Mr J. H. B. Masterman	St John's
1893	Easter	Mr Peter Green	St John's
1893	Michaelmas	Mr Adolphus A. Jack	Peterhouse
1894	Lent	Mr T. C. Fisher	Trinity
1894	Easter	Mr F. G. Thomas	Sidney Sussex
1894	Michaelmas	Mr F. B. Malim	Trinity
1895	Lent	Mr J. P. Thompson	Trinity
1895	Easter	Mr M. S. D. Butler	Pembroke
1895	Michaelmas	Mr L. Stuyvesant Chanler	Trinity
1895	Michaelmas	Mr D. Shearme	Trinity
1896	Lent	Mr C. F. G. Masterman	Christ's
1896	Easter	Mr P. W. Wilson	Clare
1896	Michaelmas	Mr F. W. Lawrence	Trinity
1897	Lent	Mr Frank Butler	Pembroke
1897	Easter	Mr C. R. Buxton	Trinity
1897	Michaelmas	Mr E. W. Barnes	Trinity
1898	Lent	Mr W. Craig Henderson	Trinity
1898	Easter	Mr W. Finlay	Trinity
1898	Michaelmas	Mr B. N. Langdon-Davies	Pembroke
1899	Lent	Mr T. F. R. MacDonnell	St John's
1899	Easter	Mr J. R. P. Sclater	Emmanuel
1899	Michaelmas	Mr C. E. Guiterman	Trinity
1900	Lent	Mr A. C. Pigou	King's
1900	Easter	Mr G. F. S. Bowles	Trinity
1900	Michaelmas	Mr E. H. Young	Trinity
1901	Lent	Mr G. C. Rankin	Trinity
1901	Easter	Mr H. S. van Zijl	St John's
1901	Michaelmas	Mr F. W. Armstrong	St John's
1902	Lent	Mr D. H. Macgregor	Trinity
1902	Easter	Mr Percy B. Haigh	St John's
1902	Michaelmas	Mr E. S. Montagu	Trinity
1903	Lent	Mr J. G. Gordon	Trinity
1903	Easter	Mr Jas. Strachan	Clare
1903	Michaelmas	Mr J. Corry Arnold	St John's
1904	Lent	Mr F. E. Bray	Trinity
1904	Easter	Mr M. F. J. McDonnell	St John's
1904	Michaelmas	Mr J. T. Sheppard	King's
1905	Lent	Mr H. G. Wood	Jesus
1905	Lent	Mr J. M. Keynes	King's
1905	Easter	Mr J. K. Mozley	Pembroke
1905	Michaelmas	Mr H. W. Harris	St John's
1906	Lent	Mr S. J. M. Sampson	Trinity
1906	Easter	Mr A. C. O. Morgan	Trinity
1906	Michaelmas	Mr A. P. Hughes-Gibb	Trinity
1906	Michaelmas	Mr H. A. Holland	Trinity
1907	Lent	Mr E. G. Selwyn	King's
1907	Easter	Mr F. D. Livingstone	Peterhouse
1907	Michaelmas	Mr O. F. Grazebrook	Gonville & Caius
1908	Lent	Mr M. M. Pattison Muir	Gonville & Caius
1908	Easter	Mr W. G. Elmslie	Pembroke
1908	Michaelmas	Mr C. Bethell	Trinity
1909	Lent	Mr E. Evans	Trinity Hall
1909	Easter	Mr A. D. McNair	Gonville & Caius
1909	Michaelmas	Mr A. Ramsay	Gonville & Caius
1910	Lent	Mr J. R. M. Butler	Trinity
1910	Easter	Mr G. G. G. Butler	Trinity
1910	Michaelmas	Mr W. N. Birkett	Emmanuel
1911	Lent	Mr H. P. W. Burton	St John's
1911	Easter	Mr J. H. Allen	Jesus
1911	Michaelmas	Mr D. H. Robertson	Trinity
1912	Lent	Mr K. F. Callaghan	Gonville & Caius
1912	Easter	Mr P. Noel-Baker	King's
1912	Michaelmas	Mr H. D. Henderson	Emmanuel
1913	Lent	Mr H. Wright	Pembroke
1913	Easter	Mr H. Grose Hodge	Pembroke
1913	Michaelmas	Mr E. P. Smith	Gonville & Caius
1914	Lent	Mr D. G. Rouquette	Sidney Sussex
1914	Easter	Mr G. K. M. Butler	Trinity
1914	Michaelmas	Mr J. H. B. Nihill	Emmanuel
1915	Lent	Mr H. D. Barnard	Jesus
1915	Easter	Mr H. I. Lloyd	Emmanuel
1915	Michaelmas	Mr O. H. Hoexter	Emmanuel
1915	Michaelmas	Mr D. E. Oliver	Trinity Hall
1916	Lent	Mr W. H. Ramsbottom	Emmanuel
1916	Easter	Mr F. O. C. Potter	Trinity Hall

It was resolved at a Private Business Meeting held on Monday, May 8, 1916, to hold no elections for terminal officers in the Easter Term, nor subsequently for the duration of War, and that the functions of the Standing Committee be performed by the ex officio members of the Committee.

== 1919–1939 ==
Year	Term	President	College
1919	Easter	Mr W. L. McNair	Gonville and Caius
1919	Michaelmas	Mr J. W. Morris	Trinity Hall
1920	Lent	Mr G. H. Shakespeare	Emmanuel
1920	Easter	Mr D. M. Reid	Emmanuel
1920	Michaelmas	Mr L. A. Abraham	Peterhouse
1921	Lent	Mr E. H. F. Morris	Christ's
1921	Easter	Mr G. G. Sharp	Fitzwilliam House
1921	Michaelmas	Mr G. W. Theobald	Emmanuel
1922	Lent	Mr W. D. Johnston	Christ's
1922	Easter	Mr R. E. Watson	St Catharine's
1922	Michaelmas	Mr Ian Macpherson	Trinity
1923	Lent	Mr G. G. Phillips	Trinity
1923	Easter	Mr R. Northam	Queens'
1923	Michaelmas	Mr R. H. L. Slater	Jesus
1924	Lent	Mr S. V. T. Adams	King's
1924	Easter	Mr R. A. Butler	Pembroke
1924	Michaelmas	Mr A. P. Marshall	Gonville and Caius
1925	Lent	Mr G. W. Lloyd	Trinity
1925	Easter	Mr J. W. G. Sparrow	Trinity Hall
1925	Michaelmas	Mr D. R. Hardman	Christ's
1926	Lent	Mr A. M. Ramsey	Magdalene
1926	Easter	Mr H. G. G. Herklots	Trinity Hall
1926	Michaelmas	Mr P. A. Devlin	Christ's
1927	Lent	Mr A. L. Hutchinson	Christ's
1927	Easter	Mr M. A. B. King-Hamilton	Trinity Hall
1927	Michaelmas	Mr J. S. B. Lloyd	Magdalene
1928	Lent	Mr H. L. Elvin	Trinity Hall
1928	Easter	Mr R. E. Stevenson	St John's
1928	Michaelmas	Mr G. Crowther	Clare
1929	Lent	Mr J. G. Leathem	St John's
1929	Easter	Mr H. M. Foot	St John's
1929	Michaelmas	H. J. Sinclair, 2nd Baron Pentland	Trinity
1930	Lent	Mr K. Adam	St John's
1930	Easter	Mr C. W. Jenks	Gonville and Caius
1930	Michaelmas	Mr L. J. Gamlin	Fitzwilliam House
1931	Lent	Mr J. D. F. Green	Peterhouse
1931	Easter	Mr K. W. Britton	Clare
1931	Michaelmas	Mr F. Elwyn Jones	Gonville and Caius
1932	Lent	Mr A. H. Snell	Jesus
1932	Easter	Mr A. E. Holdsworth	Gonville and Caius
1932	Michaelmas	Mr S. S. Dhavan	Emmanuel
1933	Lent	Mr T. R. Leathem	St John's
1933	Easter	Mr M. L. Barkway	Queens'
1933	Michaelmas	Mr T. A. W. Blackwell	Magdalene
1934	Lent	Mr S. B. R. Cooke	Gonville and Caius
1934	Easter	Mr G. de Freitas	Clare
1934	Michaelmas	Mr E. H. G. Evans	Gonville and Caius
1935	Lent	Count D. M. Tolstoy-Miloslavsky	Trinity
1935	Easter	Mr C. J. M. Alport	Pembroke
1935	Michaelmas	Mr A. W. G. Kean	Queens'
1936	Lent	Mr C. Fletcher Cooke	Peterhouse
1936	Easter	Mr J. A. Dobbs	Trinity Hall
1936	Michaelmas	Mr R. L. Miall	St John's
1937	Lent	Mr G. B. Croasdell	Pembroke
1937	Easter	Mr Ronald Vincent Gibson	Gonville and Caius
1937	Michaelmas	Mr F. Singleton	Emmanuel
1938	Lent	Mr J. M. Simonds	Magdalene
1938	Easter	Mr P. R. Noakes	Queens'
1938	Michaelmas	Mr S. M. Kumaramangalam	King's
1939	Lent	Hon. P. T. T. Butler	Trinity
1939	Easter	Mr P. B. Hague	Emmanuel
1939	Michaelmas	Mr P. G. B. Keuneman	Pembroke

The election of Officers was suspended and a Committee of Management appointed.

== Chairmen of debates, 1939–1944 ==
Year	Term	Chairman	College
1939	Michaelmas	Mr R. R. Pittam	Pembroke
1940	Lent	Mr G. L. Stewart	Fitzwilliam House
1940	Easter	Mr J. R. A. Bottomley	Trinity
1940	Michaelmas	Debates suspended	
1941	Lent	Mr J. Maynard Smith	Trinity
1941	Easter	Debates suspended	
1941	Michaelmas	Debates suspended	
1942	Lent	Debates suspended	
1942	Easter	Mr H. B. Dunkerley	King's
1942	Michaelmas	Mr G. A. Leven	Trinity
1943	Lent	Mr R. S. Taylor	St Catharine's
1943	Easter	Mr N. D. Sandelson	Trinity
1943	Michaelmas	Mr R. R. Feilden	Corpus Christi
1944	Lent	Mr J. S. B. Butler	King's
1944	Easter	Mr C. Salmon	Trinity Hall

== 1944–present ==
The election of Officers was resumed.

Year	Term	President	College
1944	Michaelmas	Mr P. Goldman	Pembroke
1945	Lent	Mr S. Clement Davies	Trinity Hall
1945	Easter	Mr D. J. W. Coward	Trinity
1945	Michaelmas	Mr M. P. Frankel	Peterhouse
1946	Lent	Mr G. J. Carter	Magdalene
1946	Easter	Mr W. J. E. Coventon	Magdalene
1946	Michaelmas	Mr G. F. Boston	Magdalene
1947	Lent	Mr W. H. L. Richmond	Trinity
1947	Easter	Mr I. S. Lloyd	King's
1947	Michaelmas	Mr R. C. M. Young	King's
1948	Lent	Mr H. J. C. Berkeley	Pembroke
1948	Easter	Mr D. E. C. Price	Trinity
1948	Michaelmas	Mr T. C. Hewlett	Magdalene
1949	Lent	Mr G. W. Pattison	St John's
1949	Easter	Mr P. C. M. Curtis-Bennett	Christ's
1949	Michaelmas	Mr D. K. Freeth	Trinity Hall
1950	Lent	Mr P. Cradock	St John's
1950	Easter	Mr N. St John-Stevas	Fitzwilliam House
1950	Michaelmas	Mr R. G. Waterhouse	St John's
1951	Lent	‡ Mr J. Ashley	Gonville and Caius
1951	Lent	Mr G. Mathur	Magdalene
1951	Easter	Mr D. G. Macmillan	Magdalene
1951	Michaelmas	Mr F. J. Williams	Trinity
1952	Lent	Mr G. E. Janner	Trinity Hall
1952	Easter	Mr D. R. Hurd	Trinity
1952	Michaelmas	Mr A. H. Sampson	Selwyn
1953	Lent	Mr P. J. Mansfield	Pembroke
1953	Easter	Mr I. J. McIntyre	St John's
1953	Michaelmas	Mr H. S. Thomas	Queens'
1954	Lent	Mr Derick Mirfin	Magdalene
1954	Easter	Mr N. O. Tomalin	Trinity Hall
1954	Michaelmas	Mr G. Shaw	St John's
1955	Lent	Mr R. G. Moore	Trinity
1955	Easter	Mr J. D. Waite	Corpus Christi
1955	Michaelmas	Mr J. N. Crichton-Miller	Pembroke
1956	Lent	Mr M. D. Rosenhead	St John's
1956	Easter	Mr R. F. Peierls	Gonville and Caius
1956	Michaelmas	Mr K. W. J. Post	St John's
1957	Lent	Mr N. H. Marshall	St John's
1957	Easter	Mr D. R. Fairbairn	Gonville and Caius
1957	Michaelmas	Mr K. G. MacInnes	Trinity
1958	Lent	Mr C. T. Norman-Butler	Trinity
1958	Easter	Mr T. L. Higgins	Gonville and Caius
1958	Michaelmas	Mr J. H. Cockcroft	St John's
1959	Lent	Hon. J. P. F. St L. Grenfell	King's
1959	Easter	Mr J. W. F. Nott	Trinity
1959	Michaelmas	Mr B. Walsh	Gonville and Caius
1960	Lent	Mr C. S. Tugendhat	Gonville and Caius
1960	Easter	Mr L. A. C. F. Giovene di Girasole	St Catharine's
1960	Michaelmas	Mr L. Brittan	Trinity
1961	Lent	Mr A. Firth	Trinity
1961	Easter	Mr A. C. Renfrew	St John's
1961	Michaelmas	Mr P. G. Hancock	Emmanuel
1962	Lent	Mr J. S. Gummer	Selwyn
1962	Easter	Mr M. Howard	Peterhouse
1962	Michaelmas	Mr B. H. Pollitt	King's
1963	Lent	Mr W. I. C. Binnie	Pembroke
1963	Easter	Mr K. H. Clarke	Gonville and Caius
1963	Michaelmas	Mr O. Weaver	Trinity
1964	Lent	Mr N. S. H. Lamont	Fitzwilliam House
1964	Easter	Mr C. E. Lysaght	Christ's
1964	Michaelmas	Mr J. C. H. Davies	Emmanuel
1965	Lent	Mr P. S. Fullerton	Gonville and Caius
1965	Easter	Mr J. V. Cable	Fitzwilliam House
1965	Michaelmas	Mr J. M. J. Burford	Emmanuel
1966	Lent	Mr R. A. Perlman	St Catharine's
1966	Easter	Mr A. J. Vinson	Gonville and Caius
1966	Michaelmas	Mr B. P. Crossley	Trinity
1967	Lent	Mr M. Horowitz	Pembroke
1967	Easter	Mr N. P. R. Wall	Trinity
1967	Michaelmas	Miss A. Mallalieu	Newnham
1968	Lent	Mr I. Martin	Emmanuel
1968	Easter	Mr G. W. Martin	Magdalene
1968	Michaelmas	Mr K. W. Jarrold	Sidney Sussex
1969	Lent	Mr P. J. Tyson-Cain	Downing
1969	Easter	Miss H. V. Middleweek	Newnham
1969	Michaelmas	Mr H. R. D. Anderson	Trinity
1970	Lent	Mr R. K. Evans	Trinity Hall
1970	Easter	Mr R. Dhavan	Emmanuel
1970	Michaelmas	Mr N. F. Stadlen	Trinity
1971	Lent	Mr P. L. Heslop	Christ's
1971	Easter	Mr R. M. Jackson	Jesus
1971	Michaelmas	Miss A-A. Stassinopoulos	Girton
1972	Lent	Mr D. J. Powell	St Catharine's
1972	Easter	Mr K. F. Carey	Downing
1972	Michaelmas	Mr C. R. Smith	Pembroke
1973	Lent	Mr A. G. Oppenheimer	Trinity
1973	Easter	Mr D. A. Grace	Magdalene
1973	Michaelmas	Mr E. M. Goyder	Trinity
1974	Lent	Mr H. H. J. Carter	Gonville and Caius
1974	Easter	Mr J. T. Harris	Trinity
1974	Michaelmas	Mr P. S. Weil	Jesus
1975	Lent	Mr D. M. Bean	Trinity Hall
1975	Easter	Mr D. P. Condit	Trinity
1975	Michaelmas	Mr P. L. Bazalgette	Fitzwilliam
1976	Lent	Mr C. J. Greenwood	Magdalene
1976	Easter	Mr D. W. Johnson	Selwyn
1976	Michaelmas	Mr P. J. Fudakowski	Magdalene
1977	Lent	Mr K. Thapar	Pembroke
1977	Easter	Mr A. T. A. Dallas	Emmanuel
1977	Michaelmas	Mr J. A. Turner	Gonville and Caius
1978	Lent	Mr A. J. B. Mitchell	Jesus
1978	Easter	Mr R. D. Harris	Selwyn
1978	Michaelmas	Mr D. J. M. Janner	Trinity Hall
1979	Lent	Mr E. J. I. Stourton	Trinity
1979	Easter	Mr D. J. A. Casserley	Jesus
1979	Michaelmas	Mr M. J. Booth	Trinity
1980	Lent	Mr M. A. Bishop	Downing
1980	Easter	Miss M. J. Libby	Girton
1980	Michaelmas	Mr C. H. Gallagher	Jesus
1981	Lent	Mr D. N. Senior	Jesus
1981	Easter	Mr P. M. Sugarman	St John's
1981	Michaelmas	Mr G. W. C. Kavanagh	St John's
1982	Lent	Mr P. N. L. Harvey	St Catharine's
1982	Easter	Mr S. R. M. Baynes	Magdalene
1982	Michaelmas	Mr B. C. Jenkin	Corpus Christi
1983	Lent	Mr S. H. Milton	Gonville and Caius
1983	Easter	Miss M. McDonagh	New Hall
1983	Michaelmas	Mr J. A. Lloyd	Fitzwilliam
1984	Lent	Mr G. B. Davies	St John's
1984	Easter	Mr A. J. H. Lownie	Magdalene
1984	Michaelmas	Miss L. Chapman-Jury	St John's
1985	Lent	Mr L. P. Anisfeld	Trinity
1985	Easter	Mr C. D. Blackwood	Gonville and Caius
1985	Michaelmas	Mr D. N. Walbank	Queens'
1986	Lent	Mr T. H. Oliver	St John's
1986	Easter	Mr C. D. Steele	Girton
1986	Michaelmas	Mr C. G. Earles	Sidney Sussex
1987	Lent	Mr M. P. N. Tod	St John's
1987	Easter	Mr M. P. Lindsay	Magdalene
1987	Michaelmas	Mr A. P. Ground	St John's
1988	Lent	Mr S. J. Greenhalgh	Trinity
1988	Easter	Mr C. M. Kelly	Trinity
1988	Michaelmas	Mr P. C. W. Pressdee	St John's
1989	Lent	Mr A. Aithal	Trinity
1989	Easter	Miss C. A. Doerries	New Hall
1989	Michaelmas	Mr N. A. Pink	Pembroke
1990	Lent	Mr C. H. M. Robson	St John's
1990	Easter	Mr D. C. Willink	Magdalene
1990	Michaelmas	Mr M. F. Harris	Corpus Christi
1991	Lent	Mr M. S. Scott-Fleming	Magdalene
1991	Easter	Mr R. S. Mitter	King's
1991	Michaelmas	Miss E. D. Johnson	Queens'
1992	Lent	Mr S. P. J. Nixon	Trinity
1992	Easter	Miss C. V. Balding	Newnham
1992	Michaelmas	Mr N. P. Allen	Emmanuel
1993	Lent	Mr B. M. Elkington	Trinity
1993	Easter	Mr G. L. Barwell	Trinity
1993	Michaelmas	Miss L. C. Frazer	Newnham
1994	Lent	Mr S. Swaroop	Magdalene
1994	Easter	Mr C. M. Farmer	Magdalene
1994	Michaelmas	Mr S. D. Kirk	Emmanuel
1995	Lent	Miss R. C. Penn	Churchill
1995	Easter	Mr N. J. Boys Smith	Peterhouse
1995	Michaelmas	Mr D. H. Branch	Magdalene
1996	Lent	Mr N. Chatrath	Jesus
1996	Easter	Mr A. Cannon	Magdalene
1996	Michaelmas	Miss I. Waddell	Newnham
1997	Lent	Mr A. Leek	Emmanuel
1997	Easter	Mr J. Shapiro	Peterhouse
1997	Michaelmas	Mr G. Weetman	Christ's
1998	Lent	Miss S. E. Raine	Trinity
1998	Easter	Miss R. Durkin	Corpus Christi
1998	Michaelmas	Mr A. Slater	Corpus Christi
1999	Lent	Mr O. Wellings	Pembroke
1999	Easter	Miss S. Gledhill	Christ's
1999	Michaelmas	Mr G. Bevis	Magdalene
2000	Lent	Miss V. Perkins	Pembroke
2000	Easter	Miss A. Newton	Newnham
2000	Michaelmas	Dr P. J. Abbott	Magdalene
2001	Lent	Miss D. Newman	Fitzwilliam
2001	Easter	Mr W. M. Tan	Trinity
2001	Michaelmas	Mr J. M. Brier	Christ's
2002	Lent	Dr J. Devanny	Jesus
2002	Easter	Mr M. W. S. Lynas	Trinity
2002	Michaelmas	‡ Mr T. B. Kibasi	Trinity
2002	Michaelmas	Mr T. H. Jeffery	Trinity
2003	Lent	Mr S. K. Kabraji	Trinity
2003	Easter	Mr E. C. Cumming	Downing
2003	Michaelmas	Mr W. E. Gallagher	Trinity Hall
2004	Lent	Mr S. G. Parkinson	Emmanuel
2004	Easter	Miss K. I. D. I. Steadman	New Hall
2004	Michaelmas	Mr R. Friedman	Emmanuel
2005	Lent	Mr A. E. Ross	Fitzwilliam
2005	Easter	Mr J. M. Khan	Trinity
2005	Michaelmas	Miss J. R. Scott	Pembroke
2006	Lent	Miss S. J. Pobereskin	King's
2006	Easter	Miss A. Thompson	Trinity
2006	Michaelmas	Mr L. E. Pearce	King's
2007	Lent	Mr M. Jacobson	St John's
2007	Easter	Mr A. Al-Ansari	Homerton
2007	Michaelmas	Mr R. J. A. Foxcroft	Churchill
2008	Lent	‡ Mr W. P. Wearden	King's
2008	Lent	Mr L. Wei	Churchill
2008	Easter	Mr E. D. Bishton	Fitzwilliam
2008	Michaelmas	Mr A. Bott	Sidney Sussex
2009	Lent	Miss O. F. Potts	Corpus Christi
2009	Easter	Mr L. Fear-Segal	Robinson
2009	Michaelmas	Mr J. Domercq	King's
2010	Lent	Mr J. D. Laurence	Christ's
2010	Easter	Mr A. P. Chapman	Robinson
2010	Michaelmas	Mr J. Counsell	Sidney Sussex
2011	Lent	Miss L. E. S. Davidson	Christ's
2011	Easter	Miss F. I. R. Hill	Trinity Hall
2011	Michaelmas	Mr C. C. Macdonald	Downing
2012	Lent	Miss K. Lam	Trinity
2012	Easter	Mr D. J. Leigh	St Catharine's
2012	Easter	Mr M. A. Black	Magdalene
2012	Michaelmas	Mr A. Mahler	Trinity Hall
2013	Lent	Mr B. L. F. Kentish	Emmanuel
2013	Easter	Mr J. G. Fenster	Selwyn
2013	Michaelmas	Miss J. Mobed	Murray Edwards
2014	Lent	Miss I. K. Schön	Murray Edwards
2014	Easter	Mr M. C. Dunn Goekjian	Trinity
2014	Michaelmas	Mr T. J. M. Squirrell	Churchill
2015	Lent	Miss A. E. J. Gregg	Murray Edwards
2015	Easter	Mr C. C. Epaminondas	Trinity
2015	Michaelmas	Mr O. S. Mosley	St John's
2016	Lent	Mr J. W. Hutt	Pembroke
2016	Easter	Miss C. M. E. Ivers	Pembroke
2016	Michaelmas	Miss A. O. Lambert	Newnham
2017	Lent	Miss K. T. Dunbar	Magdalene
2017	Easter	Mr H. O. Stovin-Bradford	Fitzwilliam
2017	Michaelmas	Miss P. Nyame-Satterthwaite	Christ's
2018	Lent	Mr J. I. Surkes	Clare
2018	Easter	Miss M. Epishkina	St Catharine's
2018	Michaelmas	Mr C. W. M. Connor	King's
2019	Lent	Mr W. E. Smart	Peterhouse
2019	Easter	Mr A. Shah	King's
2019	Michaelmas	Miss R. S. Tustin	Peterhouse
2020	Lent	Mr G. B. Barton-Singer	Trinity
2020	Easter	Mr A. Davies	Magdalene
2020	Michaelmas	Miss E. Ullah	Homerton
2021	Lent	Mr F. Fisk	Robinson
2021	Easter	Mr J. Rosen	Trinity Hall
2021	Michaelmas	Mr K. D. Bradwell	Queens'
2022	Lent	Mr J. C. Vitali	Christ's
2022	Easter	Miss L. Ryder	Sidney Sussex
2022	Michaelmas	Miss L. E. Brown	Downing
2023	Lent	Mr C. D. A. George	Wolfson
2023	Easter	Mr J. Appiah III	Pembroke
2023	Michaelmas	‡ Mr M. Ghose	Trinity Hall
2023	Michaelmas	Mr C. J. M. Palmer	Homerton
2024	Lent	Mr N. A. H. Davis	Homerton
2024	Easter	Miss N. Pauly	Christ's
2024	Michaelmas	Mr A. D'Angelo	Jesus
2025	Lent	Mr S. D. McDonald	St John's
2025	Easter	Miss A. Kale	Sidney Sussex
2025	Michaelmas	Mr I. A. Ampiah	Downing
2026	Lent	Mr C. E. Lorde	Christ's
2026	Easter	Mr J. W. Peters	Gonville and Caius
2026	Michaelmas	Mr J. P. Hesketh	Fitzwilliam
2027	Lent	Mr T. Yip	Christ's

Presidents elected a second time are marked with * Presidents who resigned are marked with ‡ Presidents who resigned after being elected but prior to taking office, where known, are marked with ∂

=== Notes ===
- After a Presidential Interpretation in 2001, "any officer who resigns before completing their term in office should not be granted the status (of ex officio) unless there are extenuating circumstances."
- Following a constitutional change in July 2015, Presidents are automatically appointed as directors of the Union's subsidiary company, Cambridge Union Society Events Ltd.

== Fictional Presidents ==
- Will Bailey, a fictional character in The West Wing, is stated to have been President of the Cambridge Union during his time at Cambridge.
- MacKenzie McHale, a fictional character in The Newsroom, another series created by Aaron Sorkin is also stated to have been President of the Cambridge Union.
