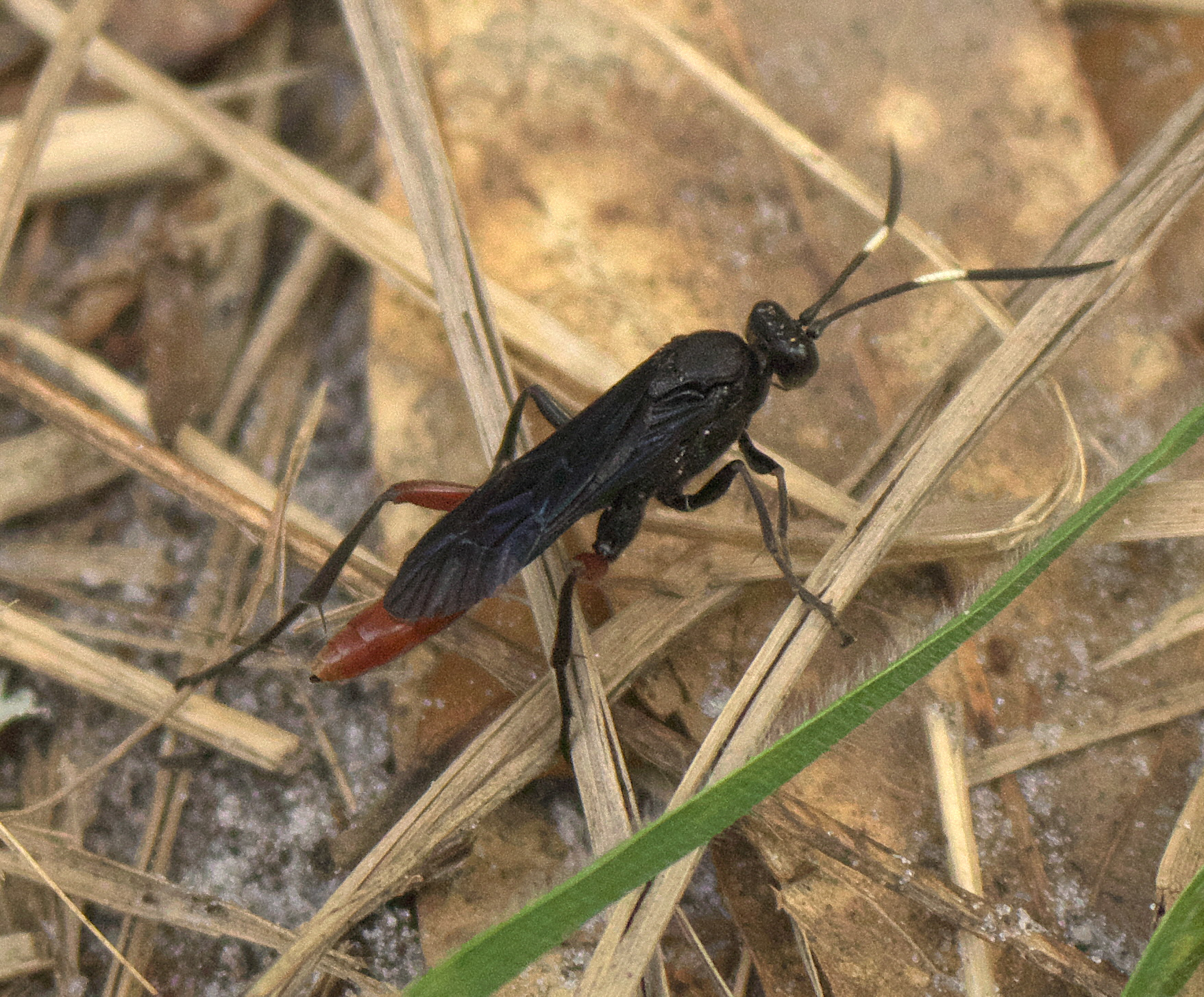
- Limonethe maurator

Scientific classification
- Domain: Eukaryota
- Kingdom: Animalia
- Phylum: Arthropoda
- Class: Insecta
- Order: Hymenoptera
- Family: Ichneumonidae
- Tribe: Ichneumonini
- Genus: Limonethe; Townes, 1946

= Limonethe =

Genus of wasps

Limonethe is a genus of ichneumon wasps in the family Ichneumonidae. There are about five described species in Limonethe. They can be distinguished from similar genera based on the nearly square-shaped areolet and the large and dense punctures on the post-petiole. Many also have infuscated wings, a red abdomen, black head and mesosoma with narrow white markings along the inner eye margins. Limonethe occurs in the New World from Canada to Argentina.

== Species ==
These five species belong to the genus Limonethe:

- Limonethe annulicornis (Ashmead, 1895)^{c}
- Limonethe beckeri (Costa Lima & Guitton, 1961)^{c g}
- Limonethe maurator (Brulle, 1846)^{c g b}
- Limonethe meridionalis (Cresson, 1865)^{c g}
- Limonethe scutellata (Brulle, 1846)^{c g}

Data sources: i = ITIS, c = Catalogue of Life, g = GBIF, b = Bugguide.net
