= Klucze do oznaczania owadów Polski =

Klucze do oznaczania owadów Polski (Polish: ‘Keys for the Identification of Polish Insects’) is a series of books containing identification keys to the insects of Poland. The aim of this series is broadly analogous to that of the Handbooks for the Identification of British Insects.

== Overview ==
Klucze do oznaczania owadów Polski series is edited by the Polish Entomological Society. It started being published in 1954, the 179th part was published in 2016, and the series is still not completed.

A title in English (‘Keys for the Identification of Polish Insects’) is provided on the covers of all published volumes, but most of them are in Polish only. The German entomologist Fritz Hieke wrote in two reviews that, thanks to rich illustrations, the concerned publications could be of use even for people not speaking Polish.

== Volumes and parts ==
=== Numbering system ===
Individual parts of the Klucze do oznaczania owadów Polski are denoted by two or three numbers. The series is divided into 29 volumes corresponding to orders and designated by Roman numerals. Some volumes are subdivided into issues corresponding to families or superfamilies and designated by Arabic numerals. Issues dealing with large (super)families are further subdivided into parts designated by letters. Moreover, each part possesses a continuous number denoting the order of publishing.

For example, the part dealing with the subfamily Staphylininae of the family Staphylinidae is denoted by the part number XIX: 24e (volume XIX, Coleoptera; 24, family Staphylinidae; 24e, subfamily Staphylininae) and the continuous number 111.

=== List of volumes ===
The following data are given on the basis of the list given on the cover of the issue XIX: 34b [173] of the Klucze published in 2008. ‘Published’ may mean that either the volume has been published as a single part or that all parts into which it is divided have been published; ‘partly published’ means that the volume is divided into issues, some of which are published and some are not.

- I – część ogólna [Generalities; not published]
- II – Collembola [not published]
- III – Protura [published]
- IV – Diplura [published]
- V – Thysanura [published]
- VI – Ephemeroptera [not published]
- VII – Odonata [not published]
- VIII – Plecoptera [not published]
- IX – Mantodea [published]
- X – Blattodea [published]
- XI – Orthoptera [published]
- XII – Dermaptera [published]
- XIII – Thysanoptera [not published]
- XIV – Psocoptera [published]
- XV – Mallophaga [published]
- XVI – Anoplura [published]
- XVII – Homoptera [partly published]
- XVIII – Heteroptera [partly published]
- XIX – Coleoptera [partly published]
- XX – Strepsiptera [not published]
- XXI – Megaloptera [not published]
- XXII – Neuroptera [not published]
- XXIII – Raphidioptera [not published]
- XXIV –Hymenoptera [partly published]
- XXV – Mecoptera [not published]
- XXVI – Trichoptera [not published]
- XXVII – Lepidoptera [partly published]
- XXVIII – Diptera [partly published]
- XXIX – Siphonaptera [published]
