= Bristletail =

Several wingless hexapods are known as bristletails:

Class Insecta
Order Archaeognatha (or Microcoryphia) – insect order that includes the jumping bristletails and rock bristletails
Order Zygentoma – insect order that includes silverfish, firebrats, and allies

Class Entognatha
Order Diplura – the two-pronged bristletails

Other
Thysanura – deprecated insect order of silverfish and allies, now separated into Zygentoma and Archeognatha
