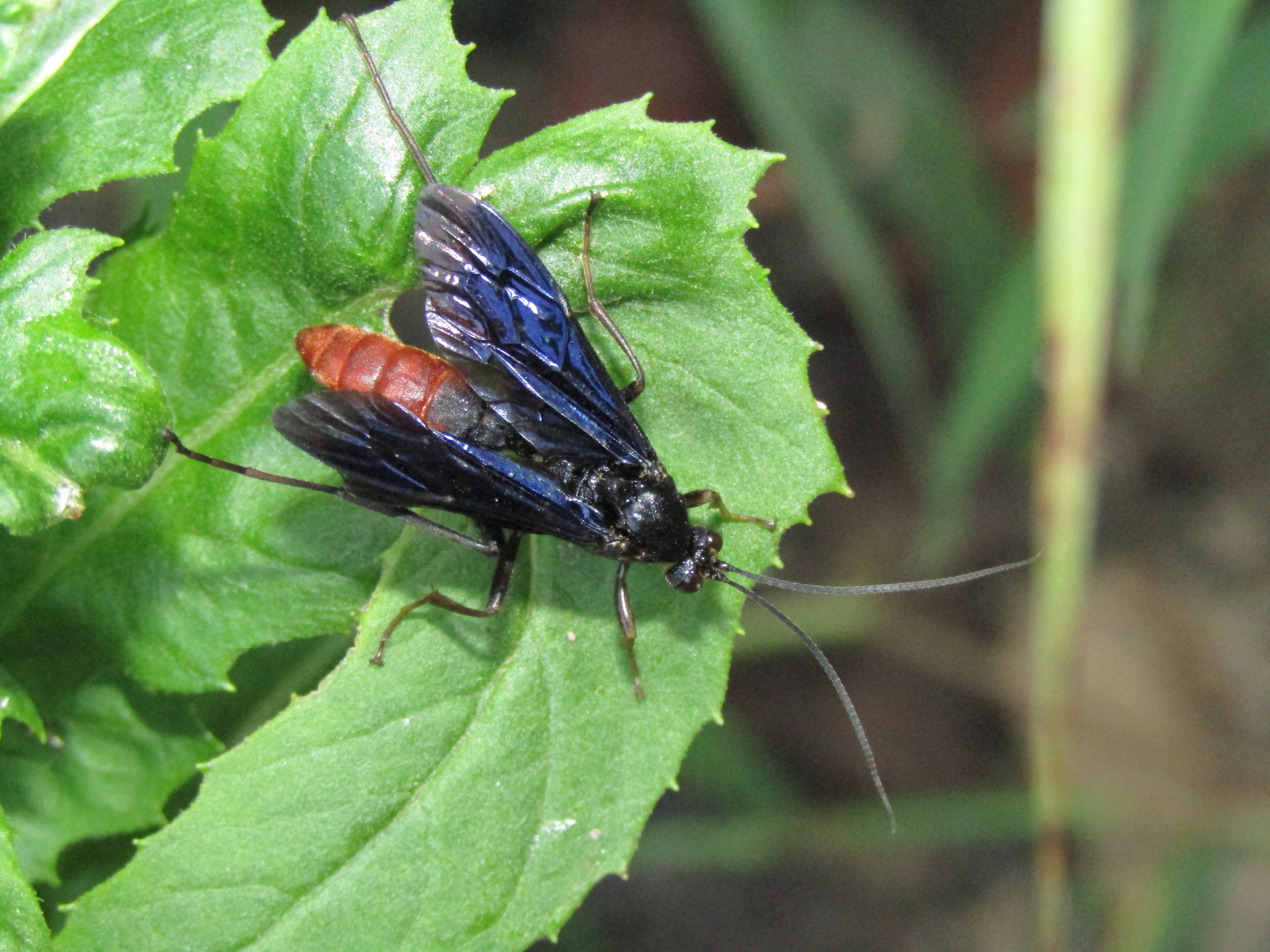
- Saranaca apicalis

Scientific classification
- Kingdom: Animalia
- Phylum: Arthropoda
- Class: Insecta
- Order: Hymenoptera
- Family: Ichneumonidae
- Tribe: Ichneumonini
- Genus: Saranaca; Wahl & Sime, 2002

= Saranaca =

Genus of insects

Saranaca is a genus of ichneumon wasps in the family Ichneumonidae.

== Species ==
There are four species in Saranaca:

- Saranaca apicalis (Cresson, 1877)
- Saranaca atra (Hopper, 1939)
- Saranaca elegans (Cresson, 1868)
- Saranaca floridana (Heinrich, 1962)
