= Carabus cristoforii =

Scientific classification
- Domain: Eukaryota
- Kingdom: Animalia
- Phylum: Arthropoda
- Class: Insecta
- Order: Coleoptera
- Suborder: Adephaga
- Family: Carabidae
- Genus: Carabus
- Species: C. cristoforii

Binomial name
- Carabus cristoforii Spence, 1823

Species of beetle

Carabus cristoforii is a species of black ground beetle from family Carabidae that lives in Andorra, France and Spain.
