= Eastop =

Eastop is a surname. Notable people with the surname include:

- Dan Eastop, vocalist in the English band Seachange
- Geoffrey Eastop (1921–2014), English potter
- Pip Eastop (born 1958), British horn player
- Victor Frank Eastop (1924–2012), British entomologist
