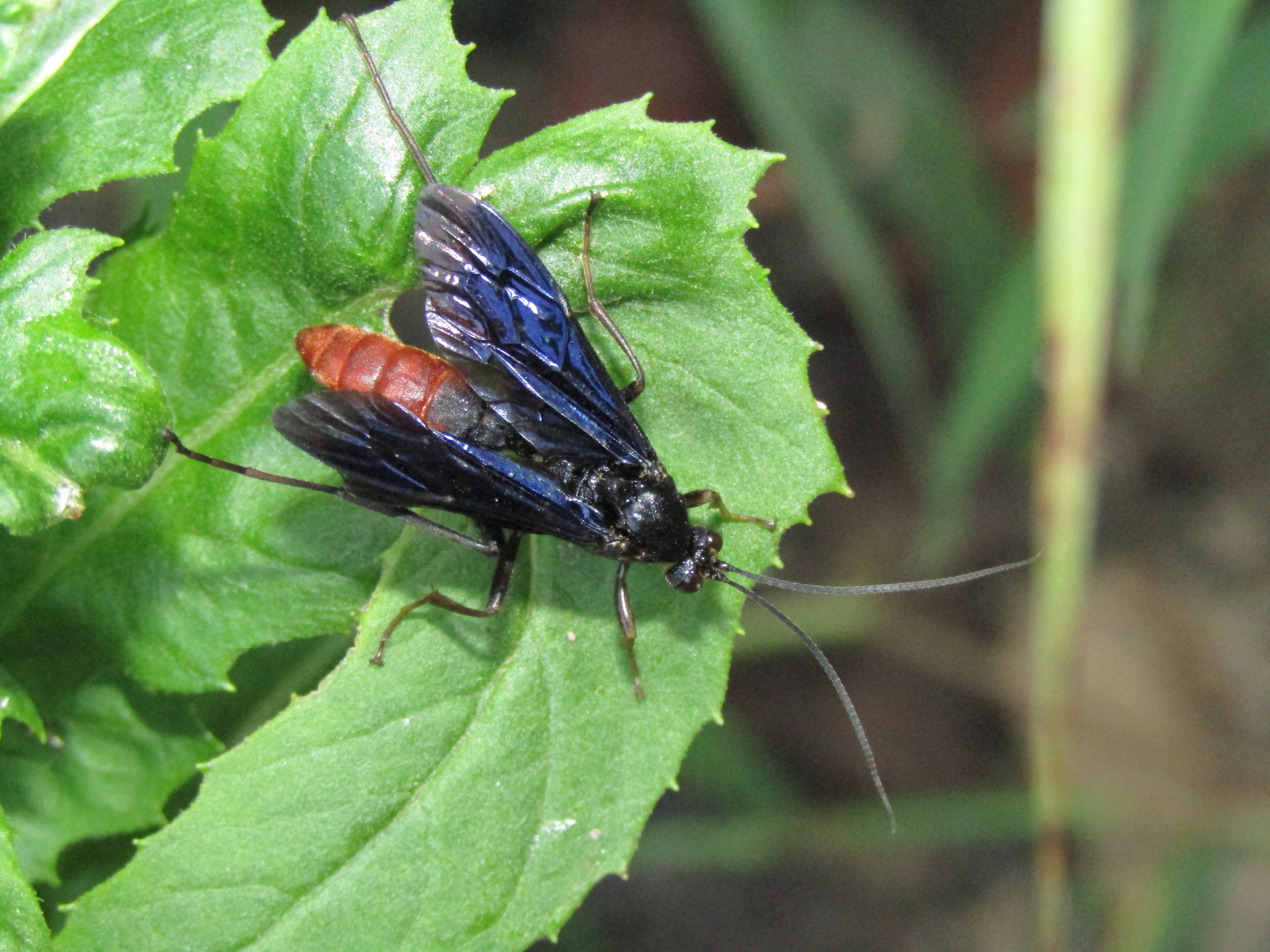

Scientific classification
- Domain: Eukaryota
- Kingdom: Animalia
- Phylum: Arthropoda
- Class: Insecta
- Order: Hymenoptera
- Family: Ichneumonidae
- Genus: Saranaca
- Species: S. apicalis

Binomial name
- Saranaca apicalis (Cresson, 1877)

= Saranaca apicalis =

Species of wasp

Saranaca apicalis is a species of ichneumon wasp in the family Ichneumonidae.
