= William Blundell Spence =

British artist and dealer (1814–1900)

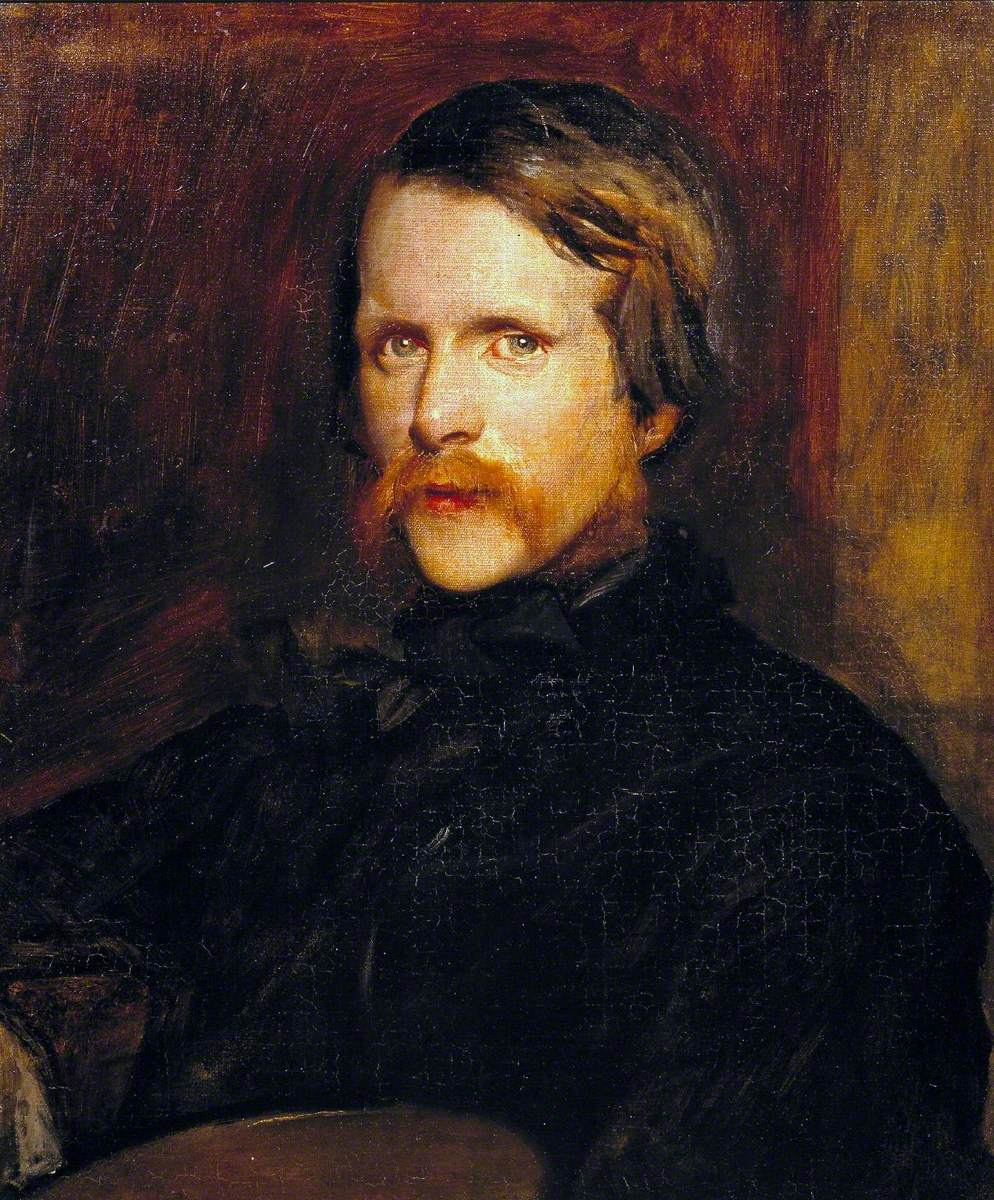
Portrait by Alfred Stevens, 1851

William Blundell Spence (13 January 1814 – 23 January 1900) was an English painter and art dealer.

Born in Drypool, Yorkshire to noted entomologist William Spence and his wife Elizabeth Blundell, he spent the years 1826-1832 travelling abroad with his parents. In 1836, he settled in Florence, Grand Duchy of Tuscany, where he spent the rest of his life.

As a painter, he specialized, mainly painting Alpine landscapes. At the 1870 Exhibition of Fine Arts in Parma, he exhibited an oil: Bagni of Lucca. Among other works are Dallo Porte Sante and La pensierosa. At Florence, in 1882: Veduta della Marina. In 1885, in the same city: Veduta del Chalet Plauta.

Though not himself an entomologist, he joined the Entomological Society of London at its founding in 1833 and was noted as its longest-surviving original member.
