= Christopher Peter Haines =

Christopher P. Haines is Emeritus Professor of Post-Harvest Technology at the Natural Resources Institute, University of Greenwich. Haines is a specialist on the ecology and management of pests of food commodities in tropical regions. Haines is a past President of the Royal Entomological Society (2002–2004).
