= Charles Chapman (cricketer, born 1806) =

English cricketer and priest

Charles Chapman (1806 – 10 September 1892) was an English amateur cricketer and a priest in Church of England

Chapman was admitted to Corpus Christi College, Cambridge, in 1825. An occasional wicket-keeper, he made six known appearances in important matches from 1825 to 1831, playing for Cambridge University Cricket Club. He was president of the Cambridge Union in 1829 and graduated BA in 1830 as 24th Wrangler. He was ordained as a Church of England priest in 1832 and was a curate of St Peter Mancroft, Norwich, 1832–45 and rector of Acrise, Kent, 1846–71.

== Bibliography ==
- Haygarth, Arthur (1996) [1862]. Scores & Biographies, Volume 1 (1744–1826). Kennington: Frederick Lillywhite. ISBN 978-19-00592-23-9.
