= Norman Dalrymple Anderson =

Sir James Norman Dalrymple Anderson OBE QC FBA (29 September 1908 – 2 December 1994) was a British lawyer, missionary, and Arabist.

== Life ==
Anderson was born in Aldeburgh, Suffolk. He was educated at St Lawrence College, Ramsgate, England, and went to Trinity College, Cambridge, where he obtained a B.A. in 1930 and a LL.B. in 1931 with a triple first. He went to Egypt in 1932 where he spent 8 years as a missionary, learning Arabic at the American University in Cairo. In 1939, he served with the British Army and in 1940 he was made Arab Liaison Officer for the Libyan Arab Force. After the war he became Political Officer for Sanusi affairs and the Secretary for Arab Affairs in the General Headquarters (G.H.Q.) Middle East. He was awarded the MBE and later, in 1943, the OBE. in 1945, was appointed a Queen's Counsel in 1974 and was knighted in 1975.

He lectured on Islamic Law for three years at Cambridge and then from 1947 to 1971 he taught at SOAS, being appointed Professor of Oriental Laws in the University of London in 1954. He was the head of the Department of Law, School of Oriental and African Studies, London 1953–71; Professor of Oriental Laws, University of London 1954–75; Director of the Institute of Advanced Legal Studies in the University of London 1959–76.

He died in Cambridge in 1994.

=== Family ===
His son Hugh R. D. Anderson was a President of the Cambridge Union Society while he was at Trinity College, Cambridge, in 1969.

== Islamic law ==
Anderson's research on Islamic law broke new ground in Britain through its focus on modern legal codes in the Middle East and Africa. Anderson highlighted the hybrid mixture of Western and Islamic concepts which such codes adopted and which he believed would characterize future legal reforms. Throughout his writings he expressed concerns about the morality and practicality of certain rules and stipulations in the vast corpus of classical Islamic law. Because of his expertise in Islamic law, Anderson became a sought-after witness in legal cases, adviser to the Colonial Office and Foreign Office, and consultant to non-Western governments.

== Involvement in evangelicalism ==
Anderson played a signal role in the transformation of conservative evangelicalism in England after the Second World War, encouraging the re-engagement of evangelicals with culture, society, politics, and ecumenism. He warned against cultural imperialism and argued for the compatibility of proclamation and dialogue. His interest in missionary work never abated and he served as president or chairman of a number of societies including the Bible Churchmen's Missionary Society and the Middle East General Mission. Anderson was a prominent evangelical layman in the Church of England serving as the first chairman of the House of Laity of the General Synod from 1970 to 1979. In this role he helped to secure a compromise agreement with the Prime Minister that guaranteed the church a greater degree of independence from the state in the choice of its bishops.

== Writings ==
Anderson wrote and edited a number of books on Christian theology, comparative law and comparative religion, including:

- The Evidence for the Resurrection, (1950)
- The World's Religions, (1950, 1975)
- Islamic Law in Africa, (1954)
- Islamic Law in the Modern World, (1959)
- Changing Law in Developing Countries, (1963)
- Family Law in Asia and Africa, (1968)
- Into the World: The Need and Limits of Christian Involvement, (1968)
- Christianity: the Witness of History – A Lawyer's Approach, (1969)
- Christianity and Comparative Religion, (1970)
- Morality, Law and Grace, (1972)
- Law Reform in the Muslim World, (1976)
- Liberty, Law and Justice, (1978)
- The Mystery of the Incarnation, (1978)
- God's Law and God's Love: An Essay in Comparative Religion, (1980)
- Christianity and World Religions: The Challenge of Pluralism, (1984)
- An Adopted Son: The Story of My Life, (1985)
- Freedom Under Law, (1988)
- Islam in the Modern World: a Christian Perspective, (1990)

Bibliography

- Thompson, Todd M. (2008). "Anderson, Sir (James) Norman Dalrymple (1908–1994), missionary, jurist, and writer on religion". Oxford Dictionary of National Biography (online ed.). Oxford University Press. doi:10.1093/ref:odnb/54706. ISBN 9780198614128. (Subscription, Wikipedia Library access or UK public library membership required.)
- Thompson, Todd. Norman Anderson and the Christian Mission to Modernize Islam, Hurst Pub. (2017).

== See also ==
- Islamic studies
- Islamic jurisprudence
- Death and Resurrection of Jesus
- Comparative religion
