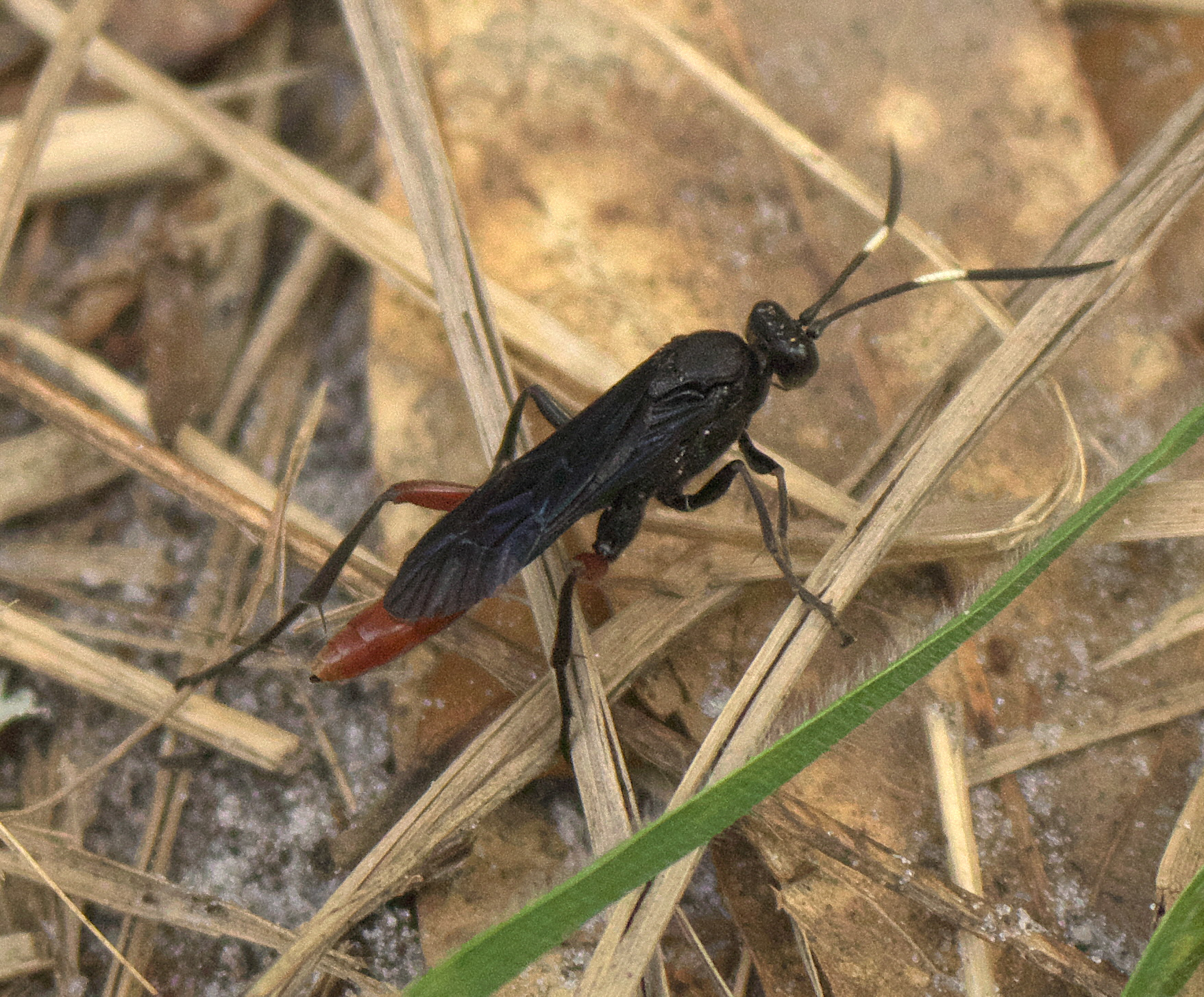

Scientific classification
- Domain: Eukaryota
- Kingdom: Animalia
- Phylum: Arthropoda
- Class: Insecta
- Order: Hymenoptera
- Family: Ichneumonidae
- Genus: Limonethe
- Species: L. maurator

Binomial name
- Limonethe maurator (Brulle, 1846)

= Limonethe maurator =

Species of wasp

Limonethe maurator is a species of ichneumon wasp in the family Ichneumonidae.
