= Bernard Langdon-Davies =

Bernard Noel Langdon-Davies (1876–1952) was a British pacifist activist.

Langdon-Davies was educated at St Paul's School and Pembroke College, Cambridge, serving as President of the Cambridge Union. He joined the Liberal Party and became a supporter of pacifism. In 1912, he began working for the Garton Foundation, which promoted the work of Norman Angell.

In 1914, dismayed by Liberal support for World War I, Langdon-Davies resigned and instead joined the Independent Labour Party (ILP). He was a conscientious objector, and worked as the organiser of the National Council for Civil Liberties, in addition to being active in the Union of Democratic Control.

Following the war, Langdon-Davies devoted his time to publishing and bookselling, for some time running the Labour Publishing Company. He remained with the Labour Party when the ILP split from it, but resigned from the party in 1940.
