= Jim Hardie =

Jim Hardie is an Emeritus Professor of Insect Physiology at Imperial College London. He is known for work on the biology of aphids and their natural enemies.

Hardie is a Fellow and past President of the Royal Entomological Society (2006-2008), as well as a Fellow of the Royal Microscopical Society.
