= Victor Frank Eastop =

British entomologist (1924–2012)

Victor Frank Eastop FLS FRESB (1924–2012) was a British entomologist. He was born in London, UK. He went to University of Reading but his time as an undergraduate was interrupted by four years in the RAF (1943–47)

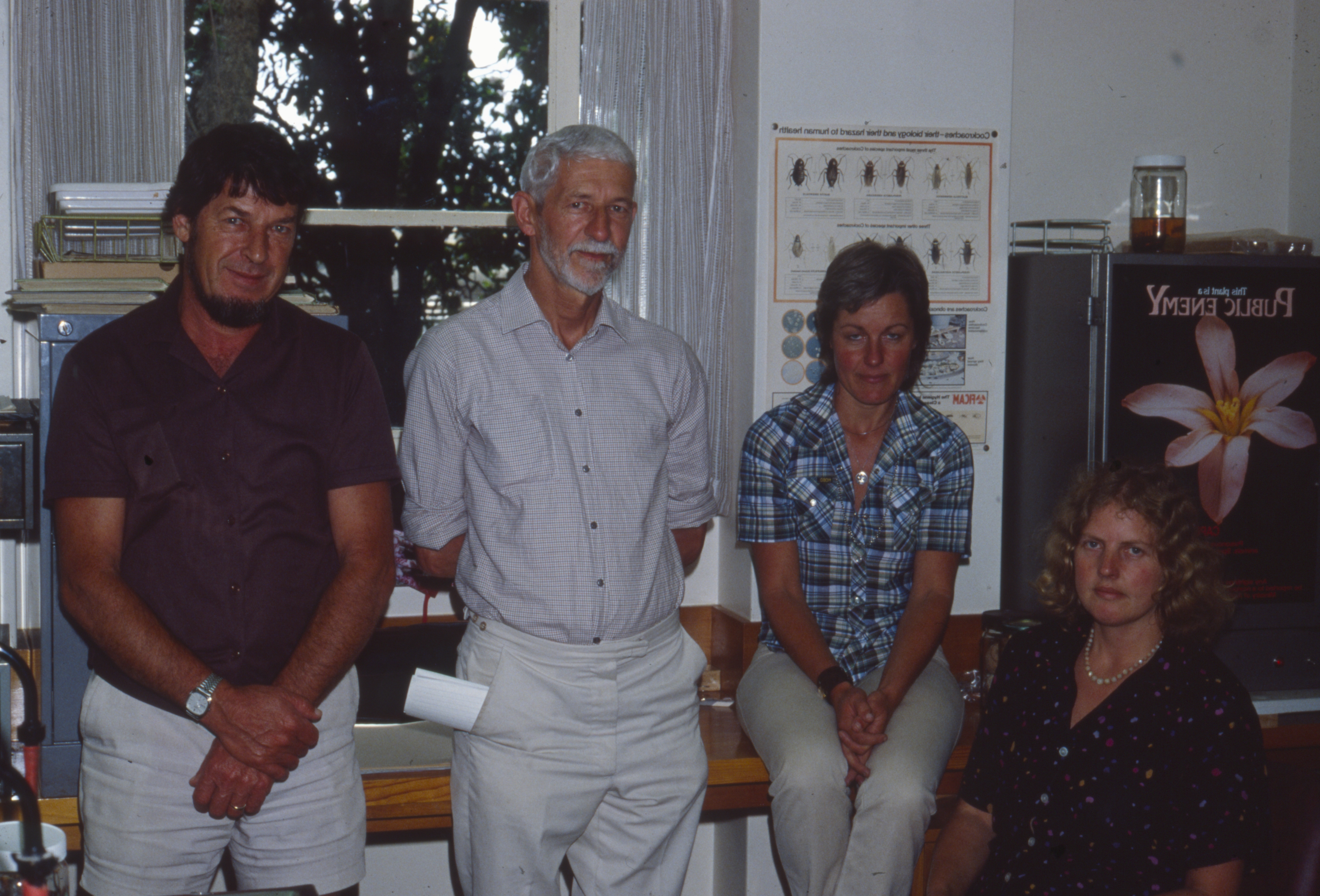
Dr Eastops visit to New Zealand, 1983, Easto is second from the left.

Back at Reading, he obtained his first degree in 1950 and then received an Agricultural Research Council grant to work on aphids at University of Cambridge, completing his MSc in 1952 and PhD in 1955.

Much of Eastop’s taxonomic work was based on the accurate measurement of aphid body parts under the microscope, he developed the understanding of how these measurements varied according to the conditions under which the insects developed. Interpreting such variation correctly is vital for correct identification of species.

In 1952, Eastop was awarded a Colonial Office Research Fellowship to study aphids in East Africa, after which he joined the staff of the British Museum (Natural History) as a Senior Scientific Officer. He was also a visiting scientist to New Zealand (in 1959, 1972 and 1983), Israel (1982), Beijing (1985) and had visiting professorships in Brazil (1972–73), Sweden (1973 and 1978), and Iran (1978). He served as President (1987–89) of the Royal Entomological Society.

== Selected publications ==
- Eastop, V. F. (1958). Study of the Aphididæ (Homoptera) of East Africa. London: H.M. Stationery Office.
- Eastop, V. F. (1961). Study of the Aphididae (Homoptera) of West Africa. London: British Museum (Natural History).
- Eastop, VF (1966). "A taxonomic study of Australian Aphidoidea (Homoptera)". Australian Journal of Zoology. 14 (3): 399–592. doi:10.1071/ZO9660399.
- Van Emden, H. F.; Eastop, V. F.; Hughes, R. D.; Way, M. J. (1969). "The Ecology of Myzus persicae". Annual Review of Entomology. 14: 197–270. doi:10.1146/annurev.en.14.010169.001213.
- Eastop, V. F. (1971). Keys for the identification of Acyrthosiphon (Hemiptera: Aphididae). London: British Museum (Natural History).
- Eastop, V. F. (1972). Taxonomic review of the species of Cinara Curtis occurring in Britain (Hemiptera: Aphididae) (1st ed.). London: British Museum (Natural History).
- Eastop, V. F.; Hille Ris Lambers, D. (1976). Survey of the world's aphids (1st ed.). The Hague: W. Junk.
- Eastop, V. F. (1976). Review of Cinara subgenus Cinarella (Hemiptera, Aphididae). London: British Museum (Natural History).
- Eastop, V.F. (1977). "Worldwide Importance of Aphids as Virus Vectors". Aphids as Virus Vectors. pp. 3–62. doi:10.1016/B978-0-12-327550-9.50006-9. ISBN 9780123275509.
- Blackman, R. L.; Eastop, V. F. (1984). Aphids on the world's crops: an identification and information guide (1st ed.). Chichester, West Sussex; New York: Wiley. ISBN 978-0-85198-877-1. 2nd edition. 2000. ISBN 0471851914.
  - Blackman, R. L.; Eastop, V. F. (7 April 2000). Aphids on the World's Crops: An Identification and Information Guide (2nd ed.). Wiley. ISBN 9780471851912. Abstract for 2nd edition
- Blackman, R. L.; Eastop, V. F. (1994). Aphids on the world's trees: an identification and information guide (1st ed.). ISBN 0851988776. Abstract
- Blackman, R. L.; Eastop, Victor F. (15 April 2008). Aphids on the World's Herbaceous Plants and Shrubs, 2 Volume Set. John Wiley & Sons. ISBN 9780470519592.
