= Joseph William Dunning =

English entomologist (1833–1897)

Joseph William Dunning (5 November 1833, Leeds – 15 October 1897, London) was an English entomologist who specialised in Lepidoptera.

Dunning was born in Leeds. Educated at Trinity College, Cambridge, he was President of the Cambridge Union in 1856. In his working life he was a notary. He wrote with A. W. Pickard An Accentuated List of the British Lepidoptera, with hints of the derivation of the names Entomological Societies of Oxford and Cambridge (1859). He named five new genera of moths.

A collection of letters between Dunning and Philipp Christoph Zeller and Henry Tibbats Stainton is in the library of the Natural History Museum.

He was President of the Royal Entomological Society 1883–1884 and responsible for its Royal Charter (obtained in 1885).
