= Callaphididae =

Scientific classification
- Domain: Eukaryota
- Kingdom: Animalia
- Phylum: Arthropoda
- Class: Insecta
- Order: Hemiptera
- Family: Callaphididae

Family of insects

Callaphididae is a family of true bugs belonging to the order Hemiptera.

Genera:

- Bacillaphis Quednau, 1954
- Dataiphis Linnaeus, 1995
- Nippocallis Matsumura, 1917
- Saruallis
- Synthripaphis Quednau, 1954
