= William Spence (entomologist) =

British economist and entomologist

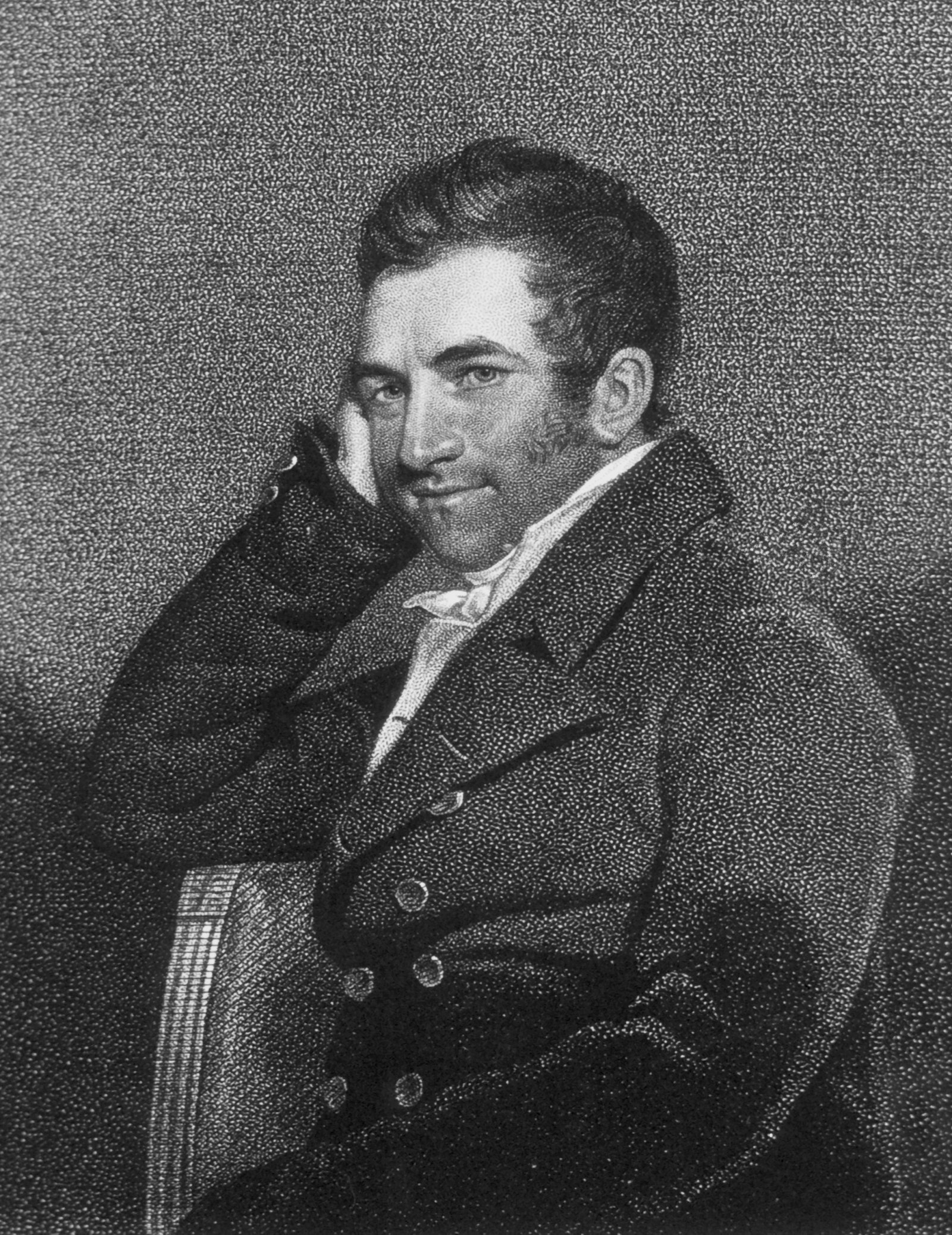
William Spence

William Spence (c.1783 – 6 January 1860) was a British economist and entomologist.

Spence was born in Bishop Burton in the East Riding of Yorkshire, the oldest of four children of farmer Robert Spence. He was apprenticed to Russian merchants and shipowners Carhill, Greenwood & Co. but little else is known about his early life except that at the age of ten he was in the care of a clergyman who taught him botany. He married Elizabeth Blundell in Hull on 30 June 1804 and very soon supported her brother Henry to set up the highly successful oil and colour company Blundell Spence. He was the father of artist and art dealer William Blundell Spence.

He became interested in entomology when he was 22 and immediately began a correspondence with leading entomologist William Kirby. Together they wrote An Introduction to Entomology, published in four volumes between 1815 and 1826, the first popular book on entomology in English. Spence published some 20 notes on entomology.

In 1822, he published Tracts on Political Economy Viz. 1. Britain Independent of Commerce; 2. Agriculture the Source of Wealth; 3. The Objections Against the Corn Bill Refuted; 4. Speech on the East India Trade. With Prefatory Remarks on the Causes and Cure of Our Present Distresses as Originating from Neglect of Principles Laid Down in These Works (London: Hurst, Rees, Orme and Brown, 1822).

In 1833 he was one of the founders of the Society of Entomologists of London, becoming its president in 1847. He was made an 'Honorary English Member' of the Entomological Society at the same time as Kirby was made Honorary Life President.

He was elected a Fellow of the Royal Society in April 1834.

He was the first editor of a Hull newspaper, the Hull Rockingham. There is a bust of him by Marochetti in the Hull museum.
