= AIDGAP series =

Animal identification book series

AIDGAP guide to Collembola

The AIDGAP series is a set of books published by the Field Studies Council. They are intended to enable students and interested non-specialists to identify groups of taxa in Britain which are not covered by standard field guides. In general, they are less demanding in level than the Synopses of the British Fauna. AIDGAP is an acronym for Aid to Identification in Difficult Groups of Animals and Plants.

All AIDGAP guides are initially produced as test versions, which are circulated widely to students, teaching staff and environmental professionals, with the feedback incorporated into the final published versions. In many cases the AIDGAP volume is the only non-technical work covering the group of taxa in question.

== History of the series ==
The Field Studies Council recognised the widespread need for identification guides soon after its inception, and has since established a long tradition of publishing such material. Many of these were written by teaching staff writing their own keys to fill obvious gaps in the available literature. However, it became increasingly apparent that a change in approach was needed. Too few guides were available which were usable by those with little previous experience. Many groups of plants and animals appeared to be neglected.

The FSC initiated the AIDGAP project in 1976, with input from an advisory panel which included a range of organisations such as the Linnean Society, teachers in secondary education and professional illustrators. The two main objectives adopted by the panel were first to identify those groups of organisms regarded as 'difficult' due to a lack of a suitable key, and second to investigate ways of alleviating the difficulties of identification for each group. The panel also decided to incorporate a 'testing' stage during which the identification guides could be revised and improved.

In practice today, AIDGAP guides are produced as 'test versions', which are then circulated to at least 100 volunteer 'testers', drawn from a wide range of backgrounds.

== Titles in the AIDGAP series ==
A large number of guides have been published in the last thirty years. A list of the works in the series is as follows (see link below for a list of the guides still in print):

=== AIDGAP guides (books) ===
- Price & Bersweden (2013) Winter Trees: a photographic guide to common trees and shrubs
- Hubble (2012) Seed beetles
- Sherlock (2012) Earthworms
- Redfern & Shirley (2011) British plant galls (2nd edition)
- Macadam & Bennett (2010) A pictorial guide to British Ephemeroptera
- Barber (2009) Key to the identification of British centipedes
- Barnard & Ross (2008) Guide to the adult caddisflies or sedge flies (Trichoptera)
- Cameron & Riley (2008) Land Snails in the British Isles (2nd edition)
- Pryce, Macadam & Brooks (2007) Guide to the British Stonefly (Plecoptera) families: adults and larvae
- Merryweather & Hill (2007) The fern guide (3rd edition)
- Hopkin (2007) A key to the Springtails (Collembola) of Britain and Ireland
- Wallace (2006) Simple key to caddis larvae
- Hayward (2005) A new key to wild flowers
- Killeen, Aldridge & Oliver (2004) Freshwater Bivalves of Britain and Ireland
- Redfern, Shirley & Bloxham (2002) British Plant Galls: identification of galls on plants and fungi
- Unwin (2001) A key to families of British bugs (Insecta, Hemiptera)
- Kelly (2000) Identification of common benthic diatoms in rivers
- May & Panter (2000) A guide to the identification of deciduous broad-leaved trees and shrubs in winter
- Plant (1997) A key to the adults of British lacewings and their allies (Neuroptera, Megaloptera, Raphidiptera and Mecoptera)
- Wheeler (1997) A field key to the freshwater fishes and lampreys of the British Isles
- Crothers (1997) A key to the major groups of British marine invertebrates
- Wheeler (1994) Field Key to the Shore Fishes of the British Isles
- Hopkin (1991) A key to the woodlice of Britain and Ireland
- Vas (1991) A field guide to the Sharks of British Coastal Waters (freely downloadable pdf from )
- Skidmore (1991) Insects of the British cow-dung community
- Wright (1990) British Sawflies (Hymenoptera: Symphyta): a key to adults of the genera occurring in Britain
- Savage (1990) A key to the adults of British Lesser Water Boatmen (Corixidae) (freely downloadable pdf from
- Jones-Walters (1989) Keys to families of British spiders
- Trudgil (1989) Soil types: a field identification guide
- Friday (1988) A key to the adults of British Water Beetles (freely downloadable pdf from )
- Haslam et al. (1987) British water plants (revised edition)
- Tilling (1987) A key to the major groups of terrestrial invertebrates
- Hiscock (1986) A field guide to the British Red Seaweeds (Rhodophyta)
- King (1986) Sea Spiders. A revised key to the adults of littoral Pycnogonida in the British Isles
- Croft (1986) A key to the major groups of British freshwater invertebrates
- Willmer (1985) Bees, Ants and Wasps - the British Aculeates
- Unwin (1984) A key to the families of British Coleoptera (beetles) and Strepsiptera
- Crothers & Crothers (1983) A key to the crabs and crab-like animals of British inshore waters (revised edition, 1988)
- Unwin (1981) Key to the families of British Diptera (freely downloadable pdf from )
- Sykes (1981) An illustrated guide to the diatoms of British coastal plankton (freely downloadable pdf from )
- Hiscock (1979) A field key to the British Brown Seaweeds

=== Identification guides (fold-out laminated charts) ===
- Shaw & Dallimore (2013) Springtails families

=== AIDGAP Tested Field Guides (Polyclave punched-card keys) ===
- R.J. Pankhurst & J.M. Allinson (1985) BRITISH GRASSES a punched-card key to grasses in the vegetative state
