= Synopses of the British Fauna =

Series of identification guides

Synopses of the British Fauna is a series of identification guides, published by The Linnean Society and The Estuarine and Coastal Sciences Association. Each volume in the series provides and in-depth analysis of a group of animals and is designed to bridge the gap between the standard field guide and more specialised monograph or treatise. The series is now published by The Field Studies Council on behalf of The Linnean Society and The Estuarine and Coastal Sciences Association.

The series is designed for use in the field and is kept as user friendly as possible with technical terminology kept to a minimum and a glossary of terms provided, although the complexity of the subject matter makes the books more suitable for the more experienced practitioner.

Cover of Sea-Spiders (2010)

== History of the series ==
On 11 March 1943, at a meeting of The Linnean Society in Burlington House, TH Savoy presented his "Synopsis of the Opiliones" (Harvestmen). It was so well received that a decision was made there and then to publish it as the first of a series of "ecological fauna lists".

Re-launched by Dr Doris Kermack in the mid-1960s, the New Series of Synopses of the British Fauna went from strength to strength. From number 13, the series had been jointly sponsored by The Estuarine and Coastal Sciences Association and Dr RSK Barnes became co-editor.

From 1993, the series has been published by The Field Studies Council and benefits from association with the extensive testing undertaken as part of the AIDGAP project.

== Volumes ==
The series contains the following volumes, many of which are out of print. Many of the volumes have been updated and reprinted under slightly different names to reflect either taxonomic changes or advances in the understanding of a group.

- Volume 62: Marine Gastropods 3: Neogastropoda (Wigham and Graham) 2018
- Volume 61: Marine Gastropods 2: Littorinimorpha and other unassigned Caenogastropoda (Wigham and Graham) 2017
- Volume 60: Marine Gastropods 1: Patellogastropoda and Vetigastropoda (Wigham and Graham) 2017
- Volume 59: Athecate hydroids and their medusae (Shuchert) 2012
- Volume 58: Centipedes (AD Barber) 2009
- Volume 57: Barnacles (AJ Southward) 2008
- Volume 56: Echinoderms (EC Southward and AC Campbell) 2005
- Volume 55: Lobsters, Mud Shrimps and Anomuran Crabs (RW Ingle and ME Christiansen) 2004
- Volume 54: Polychaetes: British Chrysopetaloidea, Pisionoidea and Aphroditoidea (SJ Chambers and AI Muir) 1998
- Volume 53: Free Living British Nematodes, Part 3 Monohysterids (RM Warwick, HM Platt and PJ Somerfield) 1998
- Volume 52: Ticks of North-West Europe (Paul D Hillyard) 1996
- Volume 51: Marine and Brackish Water Harpacticoid Copepods, Part 1 (R Huys, JM Gee, CG Moore and R Hamond) 1996
- Volume 50: North-west European Thecate Hydroids and Their Medusae (PFS Cornelius) 1995
- Volume 49: Woodlice Keys and Notes for Identification of the Species (PG Oliver and CJ Meechan) 1993
- Volume 48: Marine Planktonic Ostracods (MV Angel) 1993
- Volume 47: Copepods Parasitic on Fishes (Z Kabata) 1992
- Volume 46: Commensal and Parasitic Copepods Associated with Marine Invertebrates (and Whales) (V Gotto) 1993
- Volume 45: Polychaetes British Phyllodocoideans, Typhloscolecoideans and Tomopteroideans (F Pleijel and RP Dales) 1991
- Volume 44: Polychaetes: Interstitial Families (Second Edition) (W Westheide) 2008
- Volume 44: Polychaetes: Interstitial Families (W Westheide) 1990
- Volume 43: Marine and Brackish Water Ostracods (Superfamilies Cypridacea and Cytheracea) (J Athersuch, DJ Horne and JE Whittaker) 1990
- Volume 42: Freshwater Ostracoda (PA Henderson) 1990
- Volume 41: Entoprocts (C Nielsen) 1989
- Volume 40: Pseudoscorpions (G Legg and RE Jones) 1988
- Volume 39: Chaetognatha (AC Pierrot-Bults and KC Chidghey) 1988
- Volume 38: Free Living Marine Nematodes Part II British Chromadorids (HM Platt and RM Warwick) 1988
- Volume 37: Molluscs Caudofoveata, Solenogastres, Polyplacophora and Scaphopoda (AM Jones and JM Baxtyer) 1987
- Volume 36: Halacarid Mites (J Green and M Macquitty) 1987
- Volume 35: Millipedes (J Gordon Blower) 1985
- Volume 34: Cyclostome Bryozoans (PJ Hayward and JS Ryland) 1985
- Volume 33: Ctenostome Bryozoans (PJ Hayward) 1985
- Volume 32: Polychaetes British Amphinomida, Spintherida and Eunicida (JD George and G Hartmann-Schroder) 1985
- Volume 31: Earthworms (RW Sims and BM Garard) 1985
- Volume 30: Euphasiid, Stomatopod and Leptostracan Crustaceans (J Mauchline) 1984
- Volume 29: Siphonophores and Velellids (PA Kirkpatrick and PR Pugh) 1984
- Volume 28: Free-Living Marine Nematodes Pt 1: British Enoplids Free Living Marine Nematodes (HM Platt and RM Warwick) 1983
- Volume 27: Tanaids (DM Holdich and JA Jones) 1983
- Volume 26: British Polyclad Turbellarians (S Prudhoe) 1983
- Volume 25: Shallow Water Crabs Keys and notes for identification of the species (RW Ingle) 1983
- Volume 24: Nemerteans R Gibson 1982
- Volume 23: British and Other Freshwater Ciliated Protozoa (Part 2) Ciliophora: Oligohymenophora & Polyhymenophora (CR Curds, MA Gates and D McRoberts) 1982
- Volume 22: British and Other Freshwater Ciliated Protozoa (Part 1) Ciliophora: Kinetofragminophora (CR Curds) 1982
- Volume 21: British Other Marine Estuarine Oligochaetes (Brinkhurst) 1982
- Volume 20: British Pelagic Tunicates (JH Fraser) 1982
- Volume 19: British Planarians (IR Ball and TB Reynoldson) 1981
- Volume 18: British Anthozoa (RL Manuel) 1981
- Volume 17: British Brachiopods (C Howard, C Brunton and GB Curry) 1979
- Volume 16: British Nearshore Foraminiferids (JW Murray) 1979
- Volume 15: Coastal Shrimps and Prawns Keys and Notes for Identification of the Species (Ed. G Smaldon, LB Holthius and CHJM Fransen) 1994
- Volume 15: British Coastal Shrimps Prawns (G Smaldon) 1979
- Volume 14: Cheilostomatous Bryozoa, Part 2 Hippothooidea - Celleporoidea (PJ Hayward and JS Ryland) 1999
- Volume 14: British Ascophoran Bryozoans (PJ Hayward, JS Ryland) 1979
- Volume 13: British and Other Phoronids (CC Emig) 1979
- Volume 12: Sipunculans (PE Gibbs) 2001
- Volume 12: British Sipunculans (PE Gibbs) 1978
- Volume 11: British Freshwater Bivalve Mollusca (AE Ellis) 1978
- Volume 10: Cheilostomatous Bryozoa, Part 1: Aeteoidea-Cribrilinoidea (PJ Hayward and JS Ryland)
- Volume 8: Molluscs: Benthic Opisthobranchs (Mollusca: Gastropoda) (TE Thompson) 1989
- Volume 8: British Opisthobranch Molluscs (TE Thompson, GH Brown) 1976
- Volume 7: British Cumaceans (NS Jones) 1976
- Volume 6: British Land Snails (RAD Cameron, M Redfern) 1976
- Volume 5: Sea-Spiders (Pycnogonida) of the north-east Atlantic (RN Bamber) 2010
- Volume 5: British Sea Spiders (PE King) 1974
- Volume 4: Harvestmen (PD Hillyard) 2005
- Volume 4: British Harvestmen (J Sankey, TH Savory) 1974
- Volume 3: Intertidal Marine Isopods (E Naylor, A Brandt) 2015
- Volume 3: British Marine Isopods (E Naylor) 1972
- Volume 2: Molluscs: Prosobranch and Pyramidellid Gastropods Keys and Notes for the Identification of the Species
- Volume 1: British Ascidians (R Millar) 1970
