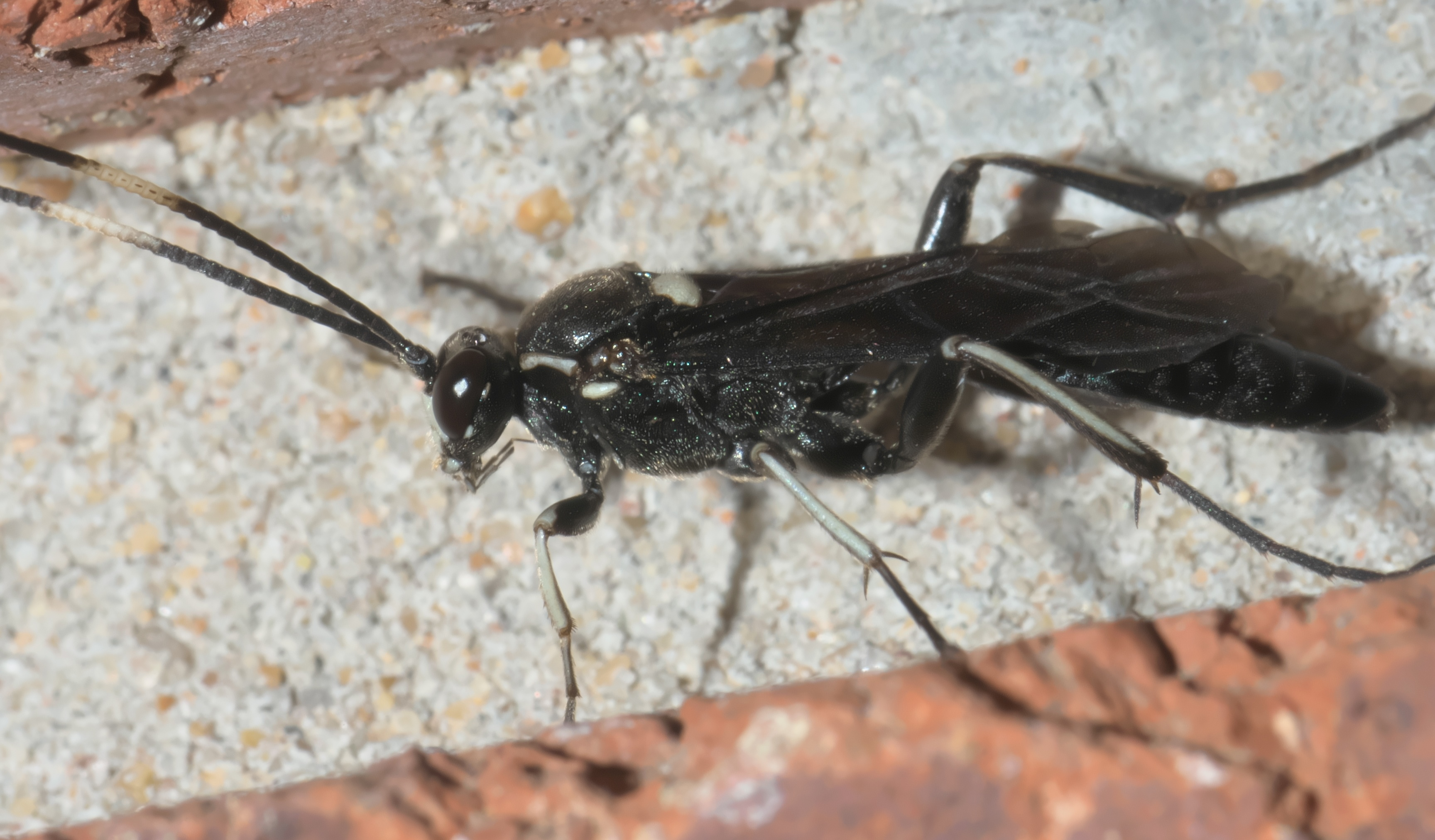
- Ichneumonini

Scientific classification
- Kingdom: Animalia
- Phylum: Arthropoda
- Class: Insecta
- Order: Hymenoptera
- Family: Ichneumonidae
- Subfamily: Ichneumoninae
- Tribe: Ichneumonini; Latreille, 1802

Diversity
- at least 350 genera

= Ichneumonini =

Tribe of wasps

Ichneumonini is a tribe of ichneumon wasps in the family Ichneumonidae. There are more than 350 genera and thousands of described species in Ichneumonini.

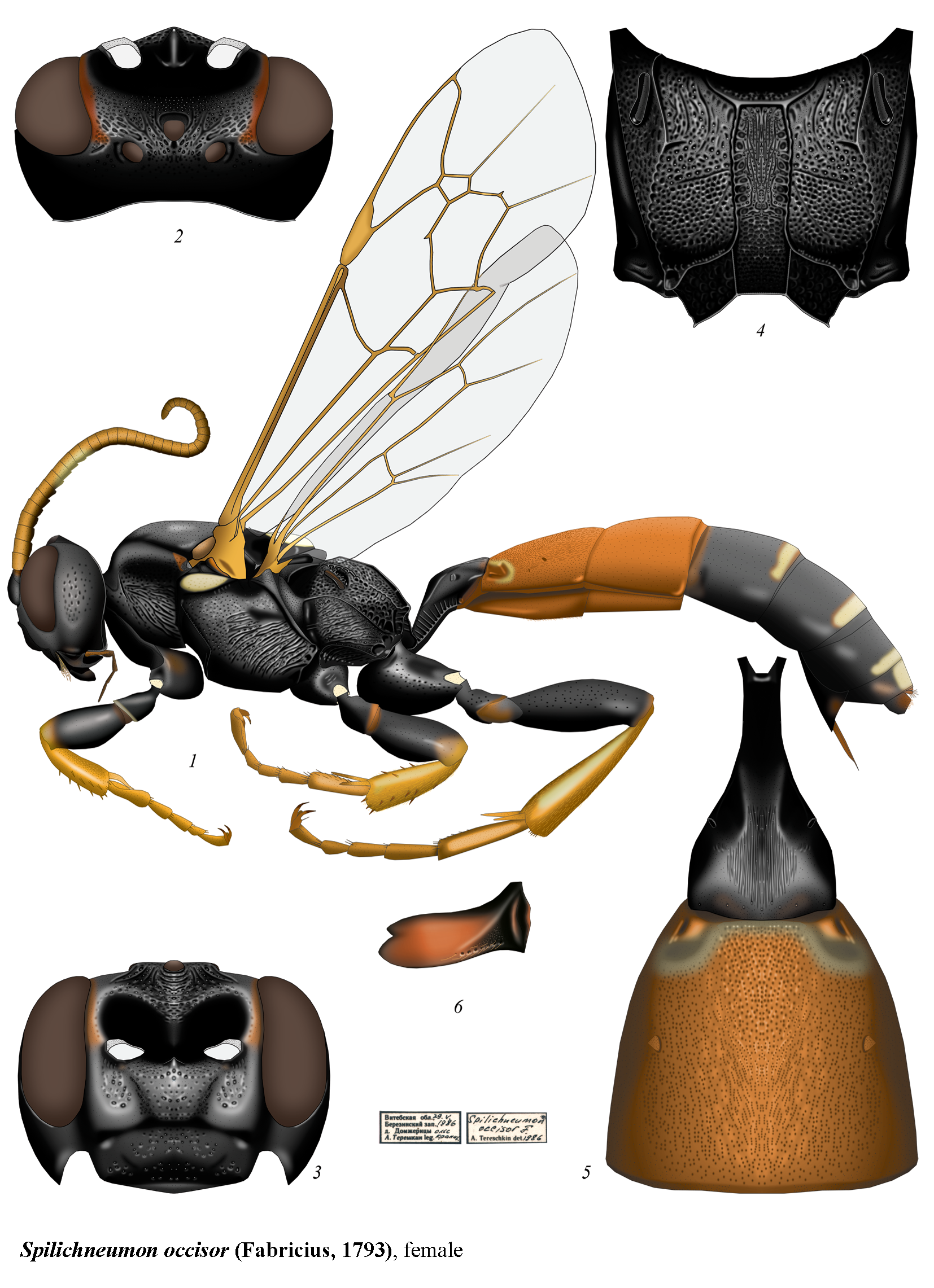
Spilichneumon

== See also ==
- List of Ichneumonini genera
