= Thysanura =

Deprecated order of insects

Thysanura is the now deprecated name of what was, for over a century, recognised as an order in the class Insecta. The two constituent groups within the former order, the Archaeognatha (jumping bristletails) and the Zygentoma (silverfish and firebrats), share several characteristics, such as of having three long caudal filaments, the lateral ones being the cerci, while the one between (telson) is a medial cerciform appendage, specifically an epiproct. They are also both wingless, and have bodies covered with fine scales, rather like the scales of the practically unrelated Lepidoptera. In the late 20th century, it was recognized that the two suborders were not sister taxa, therefore Thysanura was paraphyletic, and the two suborders were each raised to the status of an independent monophyletic order, with Archaeognatha sister taxon to the Dicondylia, including the Zygentoma.

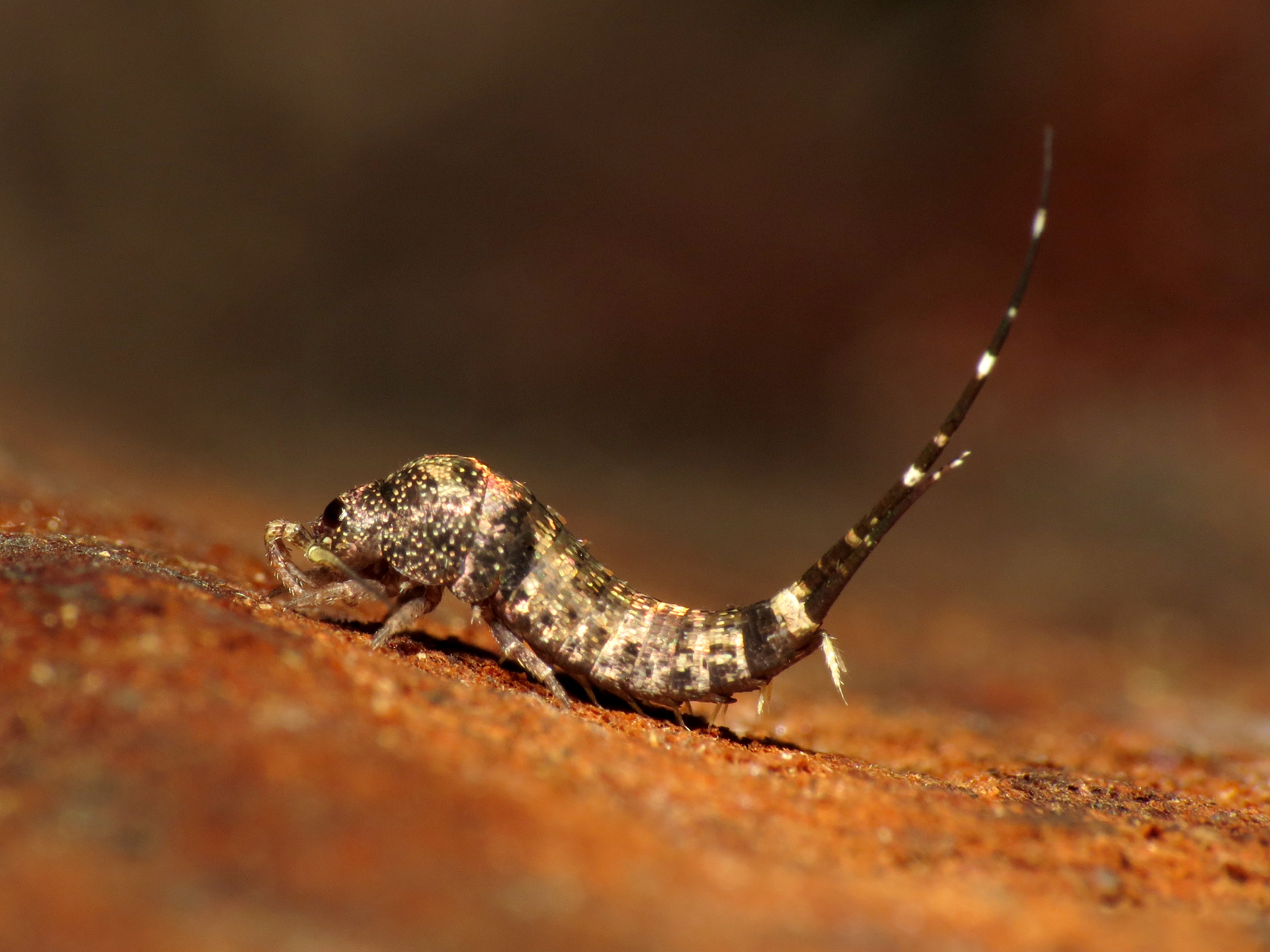
A typical member of the order Archaeognatha

Although the group Thysanura is no longer recognized, the name still appears in some published material. Another name used to separate the two groups from winged insects is Apterygota.

== Etymology ==
The name Thysanura, first applied to the group by Pierre André Latreille, was derived from the Greek θυσάνος, thysanos for fringe, tassel, bristle and οὐρά, oura for "tail", a reference to the three fanned out caudal filaments. This etymology is consistent with the English word "bristletail", which is the common name for several hexapod species, not all of which fell within Thysanura.
