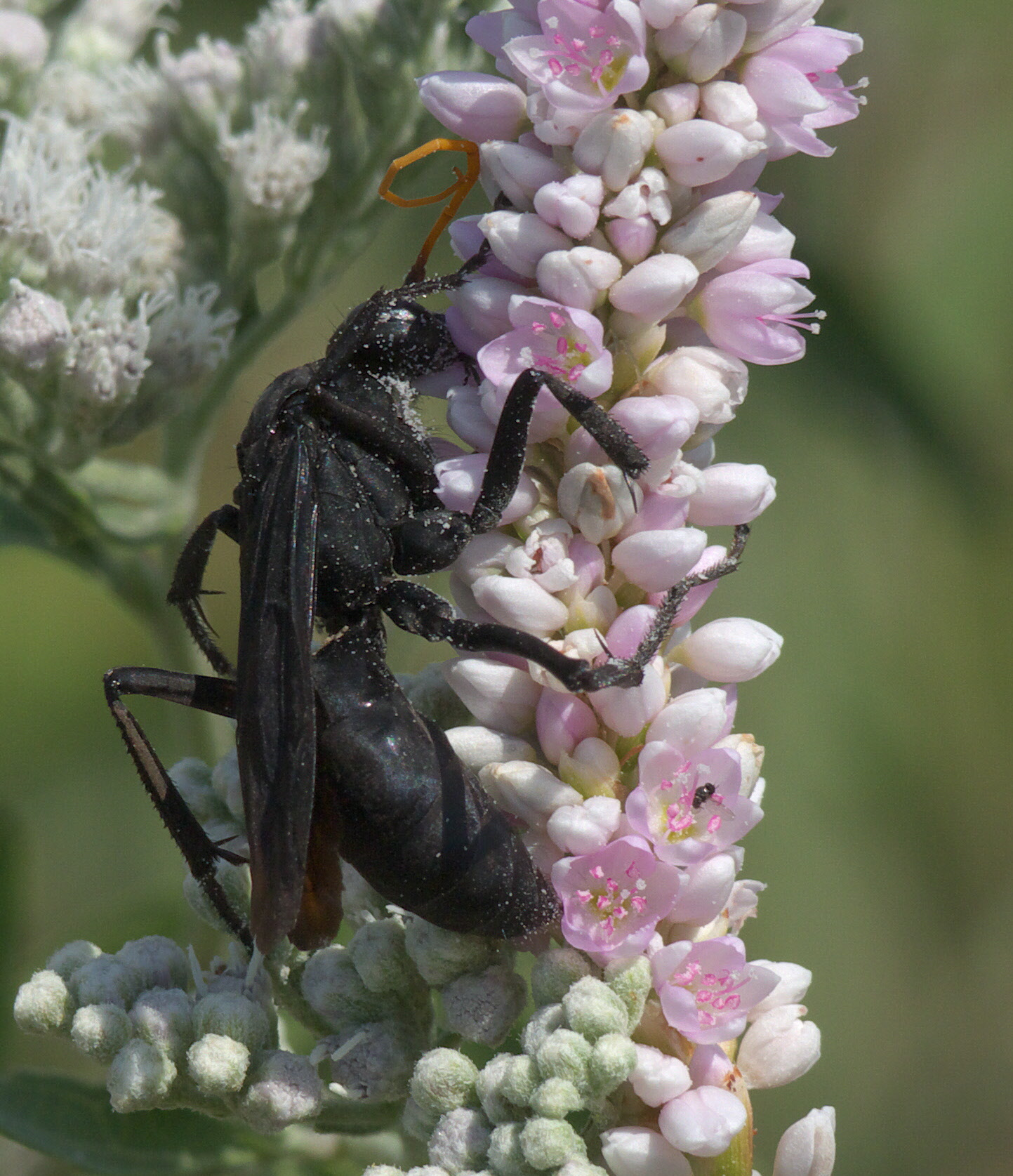
- Entypus fulvicornis in Mayes County, Oklahoma, USA

Scientific classification
- Kingdom: Animalia
- Phylum: Arthropoda
- Clade: Pancrustacea
- Class: Insecta
- Order: Hymenoptera
- Family: Pompilidae
- Genus: Entypus
- Species: E. fulvicornis

Binomial name
- Entypus fulvicornis (Cresson, 1867)

Synonyms
- Pompilus fulvicornis Cresson, 1867; Priocnemoides fulvicornis (Cresson, 1867); Priocnemis fulvicornis (Cresson, 1867); Salius fulvicornis (Cresson, 1867); Priocnemioides fulvicornis (Cresson, 1867)

= Entypus fulvicornis =

Species of spider wasp

Entypus fulvicornis is a species of spider wasp belonging to the family Pompilidae. It is found in North America.

== Taxonomy ==
Entypus fulvicornis was first formally described as Pompilus fulvicornis in 1867 by the American entomologist Ezra Townsend Cresson who placed it in the subgenus Priocnemis.

== Description ==
Entypus fulvicornis are medium-sized to large wasps, though they are not as large as those in the genera Pepsis or Hemipepsis. The species has a muscled, strong physique, unlike many other spider wasps (excluding Pepsis and Hemipepsis). The wings are black or dark brown, as opposed to the wings of other species in the genus, which are orange. The antennae are yellow, a feature shared by many members of this genus.

== Distribution and habitat ==
Entypus fulvicornis is found in eastern North America. Typically found in open field, and forest edges. It is never found in deep woods.

== Biology ==
Entypus fulvicornis has been observed hunting wolf spiders of the genus Hogna in Cape May County, New Jersey and the wolf spider Schizocosa avida in Myrtle Beach, South Carolina, in the latter case the female wasp was walking backwards across a lawn with a male spider held in the mandibles by the base of its left foreleg or pedipalp. In addition to wolf spiders this species has been recorded capturing the dark fishing spider (Dolomedes tenebrosus), a nursery web spider belonging to the family Pisauridae. Their nests are usually made in holes created by other animals. These wasps are typically encountered in the late summer or early autumn. The adults are also frequently seen drinking nectar from flowers. They have been recorded nectaring from a wide variety of flowers including species in the families Apiaceae, Asclepiadaceae, Asteraceae, Caesalpiniaceae, Euphorbiaceae, Fabaceae, Lamiaceae, Phytolaccaceae, Polygonaceae and Rubiaceae.

This species is mimicked by a species of stingless ichneumon wasp, Gnamptopelta obsidianator.
