= Schizocosa stridulans =

Scientific classification
- Kingdom: Animalia
- Phylum: Arthropoda
- Subphylum: Chelicerata
- Class: Arachnida
- Order: Araneae
- Infraorder: Araneomorphae
- Family: Lycosidae
- Genus: Schizocosa
- Species: S. stridulans

Binomial name
- Schizocosa stridulans Stratton, 1984

Species of spider

Schizocosa stridulans is a sibling species of S. ocreata and S. rovneri and is part of the wolf spider family. The name of the genus comes from the epigynum structure (external female genitalia) being lycosid and having a split T excavation. This spider is well-known for its specific leg ornamentation and courtship rituals and that is how it has been differentiated from its related species. The S. stridulans take systematic steps during its courtship ritual, which involves two independent signals. More specifically, female spiders will leave silk and pheromones to communicate that they are ready to mate.

== Physical and anatomical characteristics ==
=== Appearance ===
These are medium to large wolf spiders with strong legs and a sharp vision. Their body size ranges from less than 10 mm to about 35 mm. Wolf spiders have eight eyes present in 3 rows, with 4 small eyes in the bottom row, 2 large eyes in the middle, and 2 medium-sized eyes at the top. The Schizocosa genus is known for striking light and dark bands seen on the spider's carapace (upper section of the exoskeleton) and abdomen. It was initially thought that this species was a hybrid of the S. ocreata and the S. rovneri, however studies conducted to compare behaviors of hybrids and S. stridulans emphasized that they are indeed separate species. S. stridulans males lack the bristles on the first leg pair when matured, however there are regions of dark pigmentation on the tibia, patella, and distal area of the femur. This species is also smaller in size compared to the sisters S. ocreata and S. rovneri. There are only minor differences in the appearances of the male and female, so there does not seem to be pronounced sexual dimorphism. The ornamental marking on the forelegs are important for courtship.

Males have a brown carapace with a pale middle band and yellow brown sternum; the margins are smooth and there is a narrowing in the posterior third region of the carapace. The brown chelicerae appendages are setaceous and they consist of three uneven teeth on the promargin and three even teeth on the retromargin of the fang furrow. The legs are usually yellow with dark streaks on the femur and tibia, and leg I commonly has black pigmentation of the tibia and patella, also known as a "five-o-clock shadow". On the tibia, there are short black hairs present and the abdomen has a heart mark in most specimens. There is a median apophysis which is undulating and convex, and a thickened margin terminal apophysis.

Females have comparable coloration to the males of these species, the appearance of the sexes differing mainly in bands and excavations. The chelicerae (mouthparts) match those observed in the males. On the prosoma (cephalothorax), they display a pale median band behind the eyes. The transverse piece has marked paired excavations which meet at the midline and these excavation distances vary from nearly no space to about the width of one excavation.

== Speciation ==
Schizocosa stridulans and their sister species S. ocreata and S. rovneri are thought to be ethospecies that are distinctive in behavior but not easily distinguished morphologically. Since these sympatric pairs differ in courtship behaviors, they were provided with the status of being separate species from the results of interbreeding studies. Their speciation is thought to have originated due to allochrony.

== Distribution ==
=== Habitat ===
This species shares the geographic distribution of its sister species S. rovneri and S. ocreata. Their general habitat is humid, moist areas in leaf litters, usually in oak or oak hickory forests. There is sometimes co-occurrence of S. stridulans with its sister species, otherwise most of the time the populations are found alone. It is usually courting behavior that allows for clear distinction between S. stridulans and S. ocreata and S. rovneri when the populations intermingle.

=== Burrows ===
Wolf spiders do not spin webs, rather they create burrows in which they live. In order to move in and out of the burrows, silken doors are developed at the entrance to the burrows. During heavy rains, these spiders uses pebbles, turrets, and twigs to prevent flood water from entering their well built burrows. The distribution of S. stridulans in their range depends on the type of habitat and the level of disturbance. The intraspecific densities vary to some extent between post oak woodlands and disturbed habitats, however S. stridulans is less affected by these discrepancies compared to its sister species S. rovneri and S. ocreata.

=== Range ===
The genus Schizocosa has been spotted in most continents including North America, South America, Asia, and Africa. S. stridulans have been found in southeast and midwest US, specifically in the states of Missouri, Ohio, Kentucky, Tennessee, Mississippi, and Alabama.

== Diet ==
Spiderlings and adults generally share the same diet. Based on the type of prey available, their foraging behavior is adapted accordingly and most spiders have diverse diets and consume a variety of prey types. Some of the common prey are Collembola, Diptera, and Ensifer. S. stridulans has to balance its time and energy to forage based on availability of prey and predation frequency. Even during overwintering for both juveniles and adults, there is regular feeding. Something interesting about S. stridulans is that they consume the more abundant dietary resource at a lower rate and they focus more energy on foraging the less abundant prey.

=== Hunting behavior ===
Wolf spiders typically are solitary dwellers and hunt for prey alone as well, usually not aggressively. At times, they are opportunistic in hunting and pounce on their desired prey, and they may even chase their prey depending on availability. It is also common for spiders to wait for prey to pass near the entrance of their burrow and then lure them in to eat them. High availability of prey reduces cannibalism rates, otherwise a hungry female will end up eating her male. This gives the female a dietary resource during times of less abundant prey, and also prevents that male of fertilizing other females' eggs.

== Reproductive behaviors ==
=== Courtship and mating success ===
The male courtship behavior of S. stridulans varies a lot from S. ocreata and S. roverni. S. stridulans males have a courtship ritual involving movements of the palp and first leg pair. This begins when mature females leave silk and pheromones to indicate to the mature males in the area and they are ready to mate. The two components of this ritual are revs and idles which are independent signals; the revs involve flexing the pedipalp and trembling of the abdomen, while the idles are percussive foreleg tapping sounds. Most of the time, the male spiders tend to alternate between stridulation (make noise by rubbing body parts together) and audibly tapping the forelegs. In the courtship display, the seismic courtship signal, which is based on the surrounding environment, is seen to prevail over the visual aspect in order for mating success. Visual signals have a significantly greater importance in the absence of a seismic signal, and this was concluded from experiments using video playbacks of the courtship signals. When there is visual signaling, the detectability of a male is significantly increased, and females are naturally more attracted to ornate displays along with the seismic signals.

Another factor observed to be affecting female choice is diet, and it was shown that high diet females usually mated more with high diet males, whereas low diet females did not differentiate much. In addition, one unique behavior of S. stridulans is that whenever courtship rates become especially high, females actively choose to mate with less ornate males because it is correlated to less aggression from the males. Females are more picky when there are high numbers of males available and missing out on copulations is not an issue. The attractive males have a strong advantage when courtship rates are low since they can quickly impress and mate with the female. The tap frequency and the volume of the pulses increases as mounting and copulation is about to happen. In some cases after mating, the female kills and eats her mate, otherwise the males survive to mate with other available females. Males of this species do not try to attract S. ocreata or S. rovneri females and likewise, females do not allow for courting from males from the sister species.

=== Reproduction ===
The courtship period can range from 3 minutes and 45 seconds to over 43 minutes, as observed in studies. In order to demonstrate receptivity to the male, the female lowers her prosoma (head and thorax), rotates at least 90 degrees, and shakes her forelegs, walking away from and then back toward the male. In the copulation, the male inserts in his palp several times on one side and then continues inserting on the opposite side. The stridulation sounds of S. stridulans can be qualitatively distinguished from the bounces of S. rovneri and active jerky pulses of the S. ocreata. For S. stridulans, S. ocreata, and S. rovneri, the female behavior shares the common components of pivot, turn, and settle.

=== Parental care ===
There is generally little parental care in these wolf spiders because their lifespan is of about 1 year, and parents tend to die within 1–2 months of their offsprings' birth. These wolf spiders lay their 100 or so eggs in a safe and isolated location. During the short parental care time, female spiders carry around their spherical egg sacs on their spinnerets (organs that produce silk) so they protect them as much as possible. They prevent the egg sac from touching the ground while they move around to hunt by maintaining a raised position of their abdomen. At hatching time, the females rip open their egg sacs and the spiderlings swarm over the female's body, specifically at the dorsal abdomen. After the spiderlings emerge from the eggs, they stay with their mother only for a few weeks, then they move on to live independently from their parents. Schizocosa and other wolf spiders do not carry spiderlings on their back at any point.

== Interspecies interactions ==
=== Enemies ===
The main predators of wolf spiders are wasps, amphibians, small reptiles, shrews, coyotes, and some spider-eating birds. Several wasp species utilize wolf spiders as a means to incubate their eggs. Wasp mothers paralyze spiders with their stingers for some time and inject their eggs inside and once the larvae develop inside, they consume the spider inside-out. Shrews require constant dietary intake so even though wolf spiders are small meals, they are known to consume many such small spiders just like coyotes. In addition, wolf spiders are susceptible when they venture out alone to hunt, and can be attacked by birds during that time.

=== Protective coloration and defense ===
They depend on camouflage for protection from predators, so their coloration is meant to match the leaf litter in their habitat. This is why the body coloration is dull and there is little flashy ornamentation to unnecessarily attract attention toward itself. S. stridulans is known for its agility and this helps them in escaping from predators. If they are attacked aggressively by predators or other competitors, then wolf spiders typically use their strong large jaws to bite. In a life or death situation, a wolf spider might let its leg get bitten off for survival at the moment, though it reduces their quickness and makes them susceptible to attack later on.

== Physiology ==
Wolf spiders are known for their large eyes which give them an advantage with their keen vision. They also have an abundance of sensitive sensory hairs all over the legs and bodies, adding to their strong sense of touch. Another special aspect of wolf spiders is their grate shaped tapetum lucidum, a reflective tissue present in their four secondary eyes, giving them a visible glow.

=== Thermoregulation ===
==== Overwintering ====
Schizocosa stridulans are rather active in the winter and are seen gaining a considerable amount of weight throughout those months. In the studies conducted by Potts, the spiders had less fluctuating protein levels, however their lipid and carbohydrate counts decreased throughout the winter. During that time, S. stridulans accumulated glycerol and a few other previously known cryoprotectants. The spiders are more active on the warmer winter days, and are relatively vulnerable in extremely cold conditions.

== Bites ==
Schizocosa stridulans rarely bite and if they do, it is the result of consistent provocation. Other wolf spiders are known to inject venom, however they cause only mild symptoms such as swelling, rashes, and itching. Certain cases of necrotic bites, those that result in dead tissue, have been seen by South American and Australian spiders but this is infrequent.

== Interactions with humans and livestock ==
Wolf spiders eat a variety of small nuisance insects, and therefore they are essential to the naturally present population control of their prey and are beneficial to farmers and gardeners.
