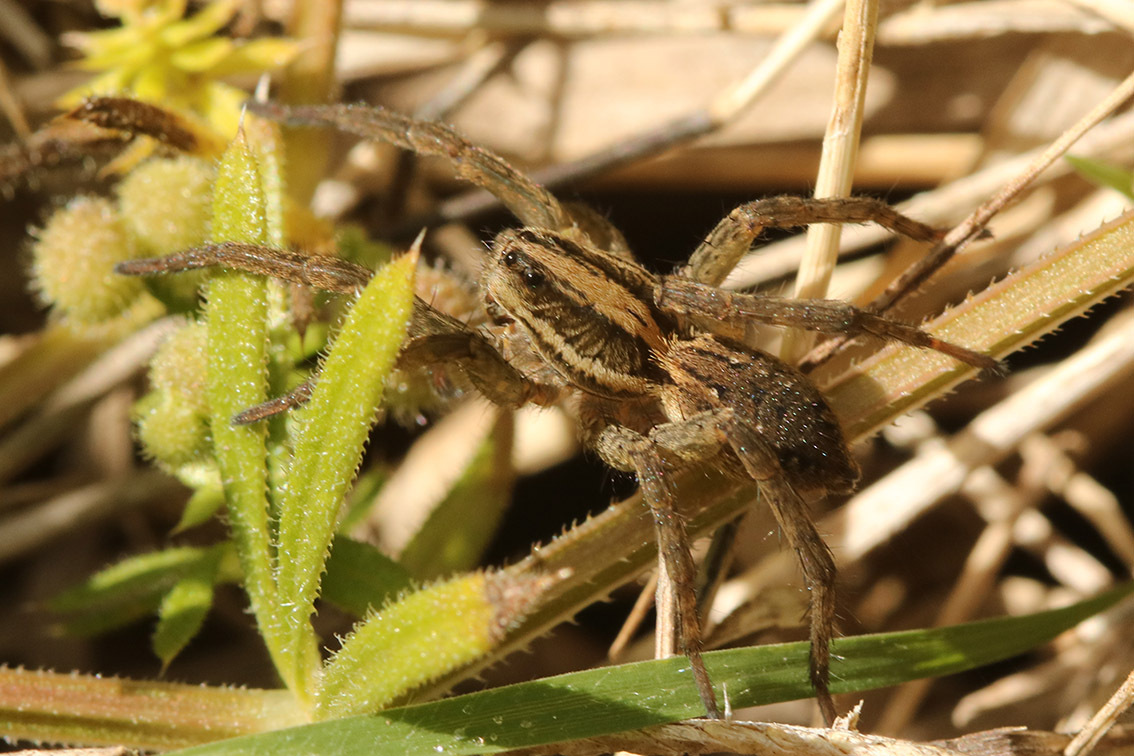
- T. moesta in Argentina
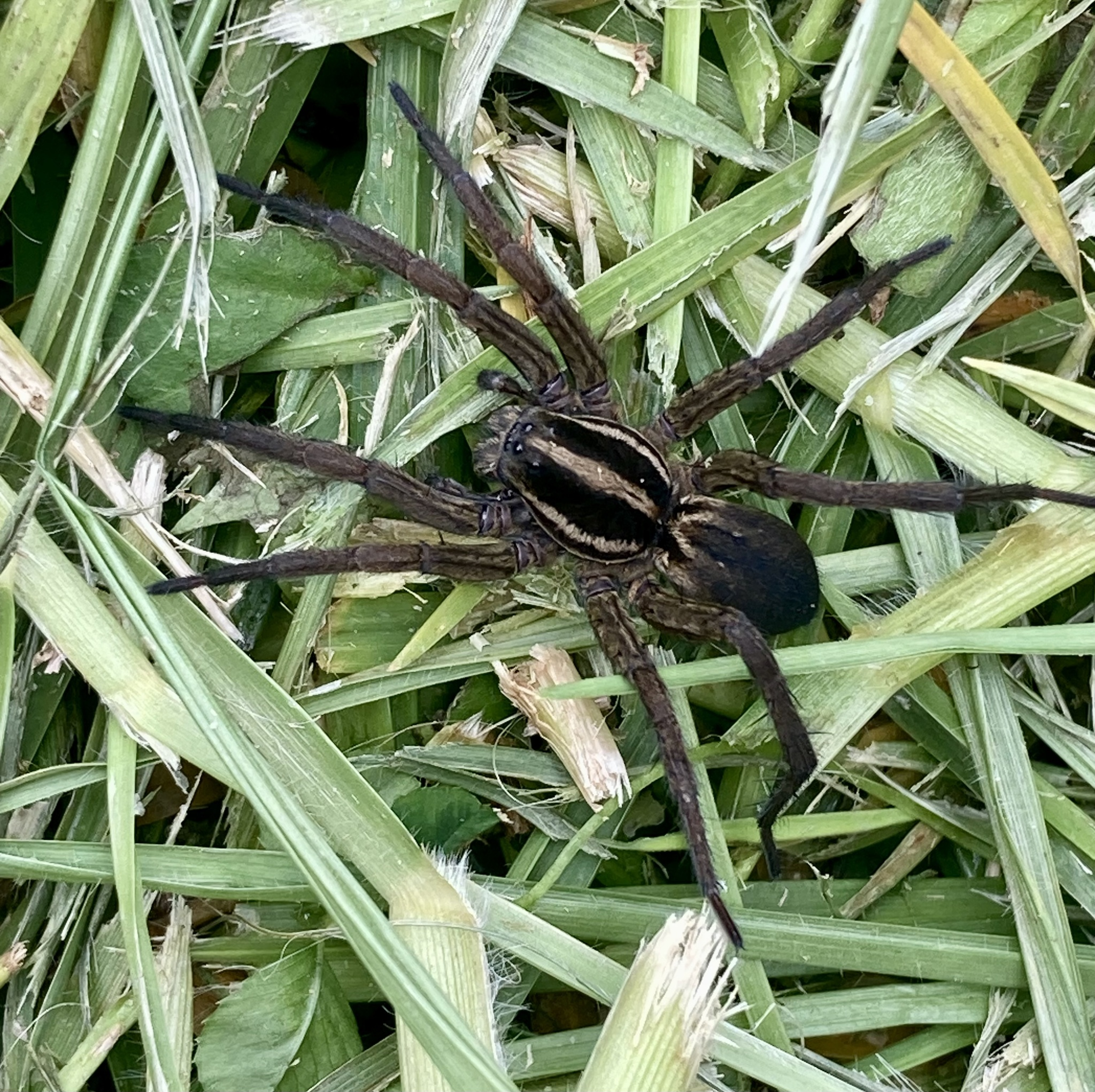
- T. thorelli in Colombia

Scientific classification
- Kingdom: Animalia
- Phylum: Arthropoda
- Subphylum: Chelicerata
- Class: Arachnida
- Order: Araneae
- Infraorder: Araneomorphae
- Family: Lycosidae
- Subfamily: Lycosinae
- Genus: Tropicosa; Paredes-Munguia, Brescovit & Teixeira, 2023

Type species
- Lycosa moesta Holmberg, 1876

Species
- 4, see text

= Tropicosa =

Genus of spiders

Tropicosa is a genus of spiders in the family Lycosidae.

== Distribution ==
Tropicosa occurs in South America, with its range extending from Colombia in the north through Peru and Brazil in the central regions to Paraguay, Uruguay, and Argentina in the south.

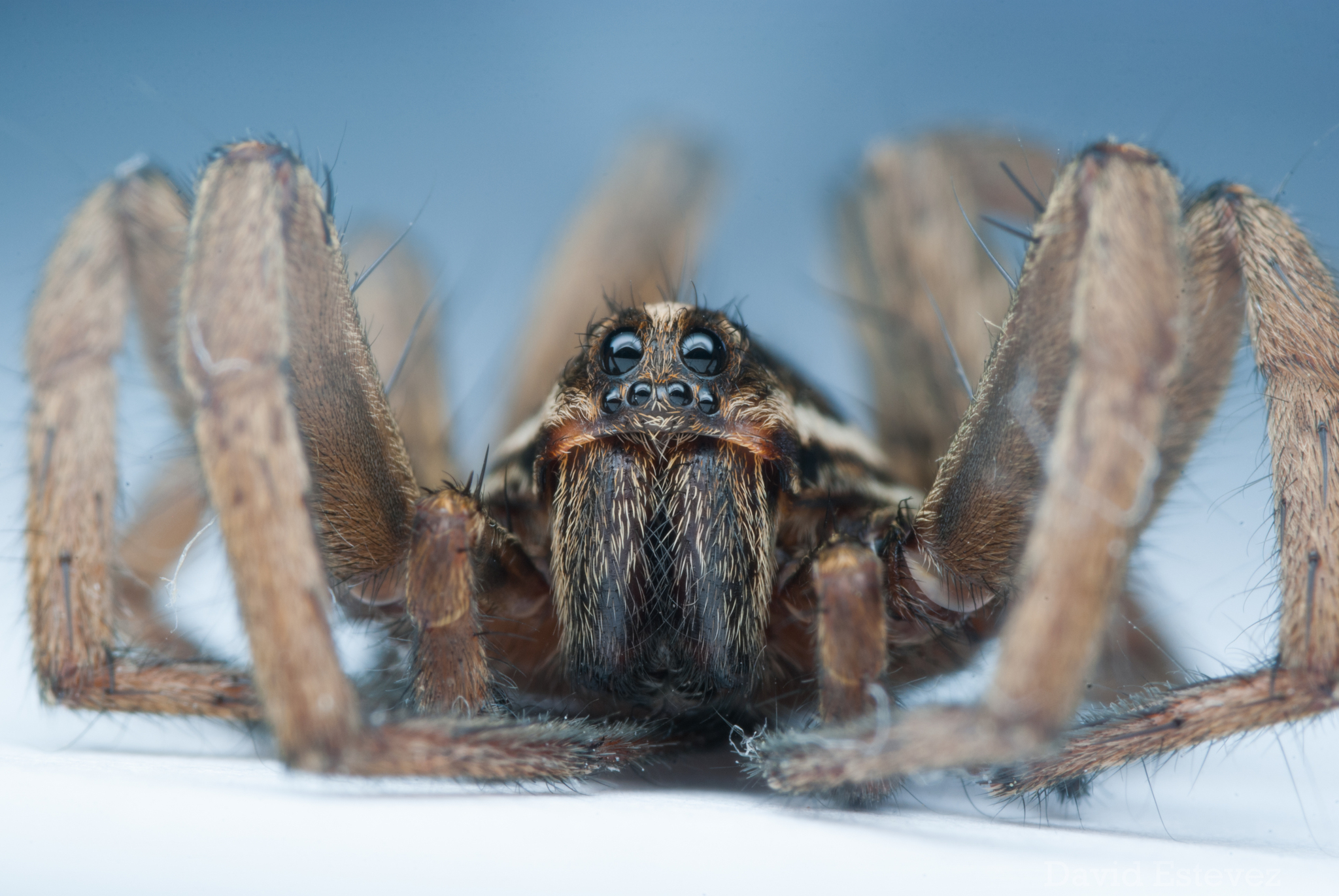
T. thorelli faking death

== Etymology ==
The genus name is a combination of "tropic", referring to the neotropical distribution of its species, and the common wolf spider genus ending "-cosa".

== Taxonomy ==
Three species were transferred to the newly erected genus from Lycosa, Alopecosa, and Schizocosa.

== Species ==
As of January 2026, this genus includes four species:

- Tropicosa baguala Paredes-Munguia, Brescovit & Teixeira, 2023 – Brazil
- Tropicosa chelifasciata (Mello-Leitão, 1943) – Peru, Brazil
- Tropicosa moesta (Holmberg, 1876) – Peru, Brazil, Uruguay, Argentina
- Tropicosa thorelli (Keyserling, 1877) – Colombia, Peru, Brazil, Paraguay, Argentina
