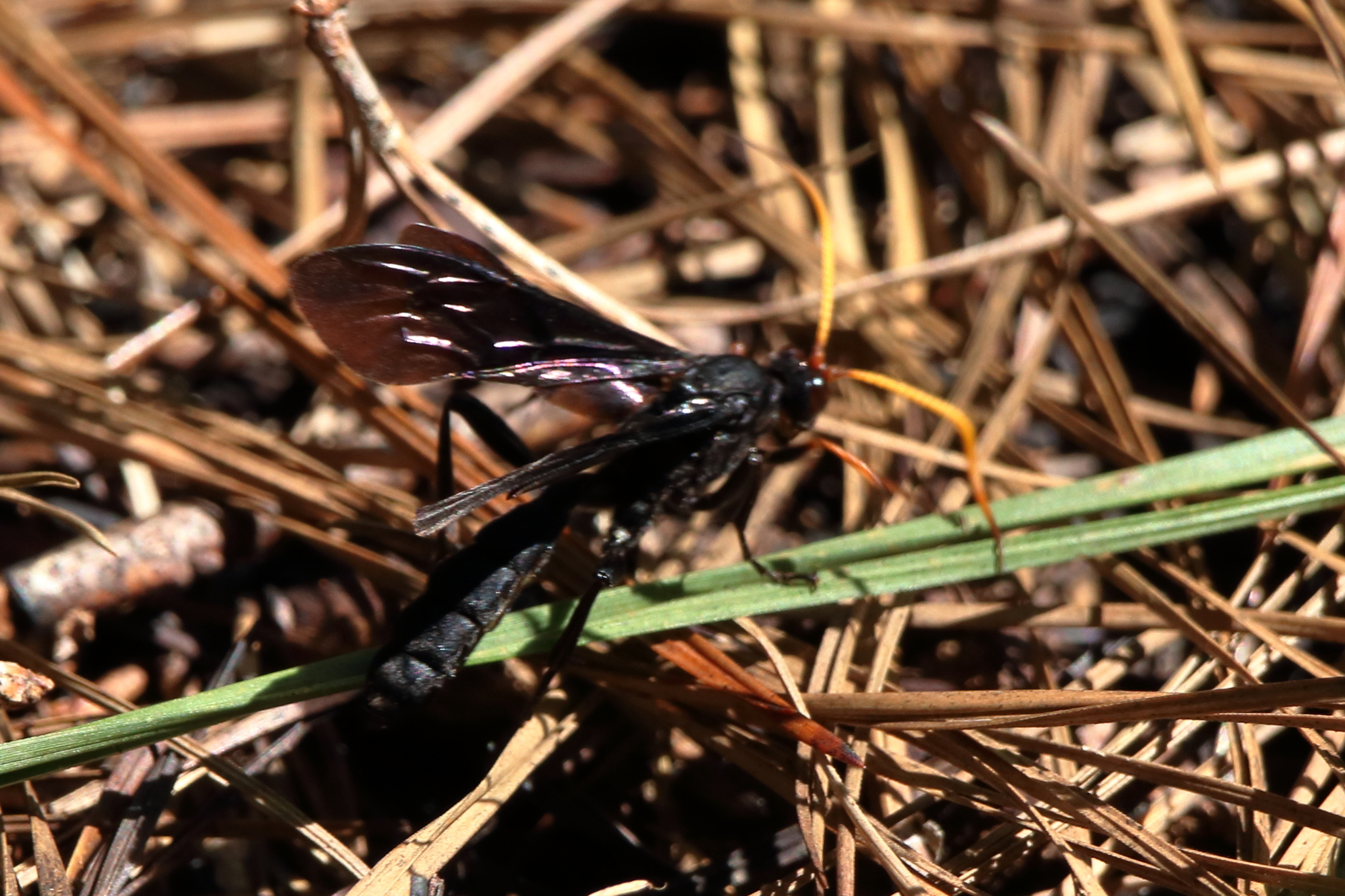

Scientific classification
- Kingdom: Animalia
- Phylum: Arthropoda
- Clade: Pancrustacea
- Class: Insecta
- Order: Hymenoptera
- Family: Ichneumonidae
- Genus: Gnamptopelta; Hopper, 1939
- Species: G. obsidianator

Binomial name
- Gnamptopelta obsidianator (Brullé, 1846)

Synonyms
- Trogus obsigianator Brullé, 1846; Trogus austrinus Cresson, 1868; Gnamptopelta austrina (Cresson, 1868); Gnamptopelta obsidianator austrina (Cresson, 1868); Gnamptopelta obsigianator obsigianator (Brullé, 1846)

= Gnamptopelta =

Species of insect

Gnamptopelta obsidianator is a species of wasp in the family Ichneumonidae and the only species in the monotypic genus Gnamptopelta.

== Etymology ==
The genus name Gnamptopelta is derived from the Greek γναμπτός (gnamptós) meaning 'bent' or 'curved' plus the Greek πέλτη (péltē) meaning 'shield'. This refers to the concave shape of the clypeus found in this genus.

== Description and identification ==
Gnamptopelta obsidianator can be distinguished from allied genera by the concave structure of the clypeus. They are large wasps with a body length of 20 to 23 millimetres (13/16 to 7/8 in). The scutellum is high and conical. Typically, the body is almost entirely black, including the wings, except for the fore and mid legs, of which the tibiae and tarsi are yellowish-brown. In some specimens, the orbits may be yellow. The antennae are orange-yellow, sometimes with the tips blackish. Specimens from the southern extent of the species' range may have parts of the head and thorax more or less ferruginous.

This species is very similar in appearance to Conocalma brullei but can be distinguished by the lack of an elevated structure on the petiole of the abdomen and by the shape of the clypeus.

== Taxonomy ==
This species was originally described by Gaspard Auguste Brullé in 1846 as Trogus obsidianator. Trogus austrinus was later described as a separate species by Cresson in 1868 to represent southern specimens that differed from Brullé's Trogus obsidianator by having the head and parts of the thorax ferruginous rather than black. A new genus, Gnamptopelta, was described for the two genera by Hopper in 1939 based on differences in clypeal structure. Henry and Marjorie Townes later re-evaluated the genus in 1951 and considered the two to represent a single species with two differently-colored subspecies. Further revision by Karen Sime and David Wahl in 1998 placed even these subspecies into synonymy.

== Distribution and habitat ==
Gnamptopelta obsidianator is found across eastern North America from Quebec south to Florida and as far west as Manitoba and New Mexico.

== Behavior ==
Adults fly in the spring from March to May. Females are associated with grapevines and parasitize caterpillars of the subfamily Macroglossinae that feed on Vitis aestivalis. Known hosts include Darapsa myron, Amphion floridensis, and Eumorpha achemon. Eggs are laid inside third through fifth instars.

== Parasites ==
This species is parasitized by Aleiodes texanus, a species of braconid wasp.
