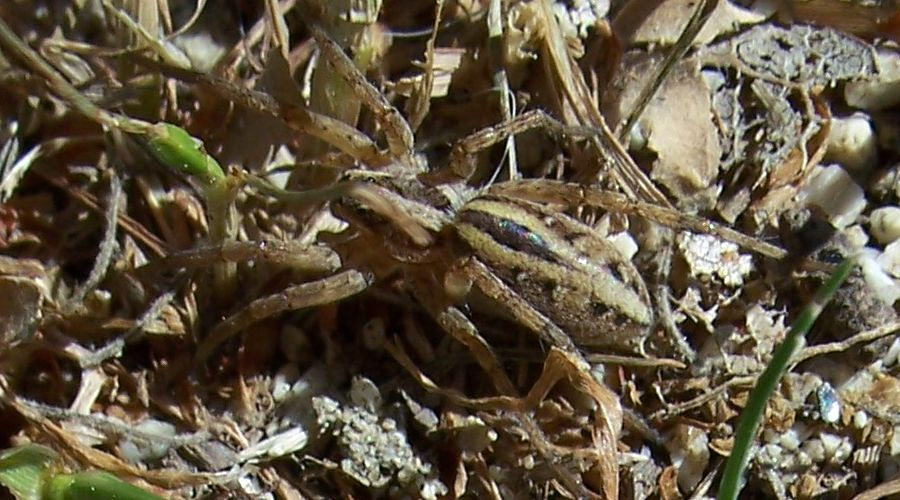

Scientific classification
- Kingdom: Animalia
- Phylum: Arthropoda
- Subphylum: Chelicerata
- Class: Arachnida
- Order: Araneae
- Infraorder: Araneomorphae
- Family: Lycosidae
- Genus: Schizocosa
- Species: S. mccooki

Binomial name
- Schizocosa mccooki Montgomery, 1904

Synonyms
- Lycosa mccooki Montgomery, 1904; Lycosa pacifica Banks, 1904; Lycosa tusapa Chamberlin, 1925; Schizocosa (Avicosa) wasatchensis Chamberlin & Ivie, 1942; Avicosa wasatchensis Roewer, 1955

= Schizocosa mccooki =

Species of wolf spider

Schizocosa mccooki is a species of wolf spider in the family Lycosidae. They can be found from the west coast to western Lake Erie in western North America, including Canada, the United States, and Mexico.

== Description ==
Schizocosa mccooki is a large wolf spider with the body length ranging between 9.1–15.5 mm (0.36–0.61 in) for males and 9.6–22.7 mm (0.38–0.89 in) for females. The carapace ranges in color from gray to light brown with a pale median band, black lateral bands, and pale submarginal bands that sometimes extend to the margins. The dorsum of the abdomen typically has a demarcated heart mark and dark transverse bars with a series of paired white spots, while the lateral areas are mottled yellow, brown, and black, with a few oblique black lines. The venter ranges in color from reddish-brown to dark orange, but may also have may extensive black areas, particularly under the abdomen. Males and females have similar appearances, with the exception of darker tipped forelegs in females.

=== Similar species ===
S. maxima and S. mccooki are virtually indistinguishable except by size. S. maxima have a body length ranging between 16.1–20.3 mm (0.63–0.80 in) for males and 21–28.4 mm (0.83–1.12 in) for females. Recent phylogenomic work suggests that S. maxima may be a junior synonym of S. mccooki, however formal nomenclatural changes are pending future studies.

== Habitat ==
S. mccooki are widespread in open habitats such as grasslands, chaparral, the desert, and pinyon pine forests, among others. Some populations of this species have been observed digging burrows.
