= Schizocosa saltatrix =

Scientific classification
- Kingdom: Animalia
- Phylum: Arthropoda
- Subphylum: Chelicerata
- Class: Arachnida
- Order: Araneae
- Infraorder: Araneomorphae
- Family: Lycosidae
- Genus: Schizocosa
- Species: S. saltatrix

Binomial name
- Schizocosa saltatrix (Hentz, 1844)

Species of spider

Schizocosa saltatrix is a species of wolf spider in the family Lycosidae. It is found in North America.
