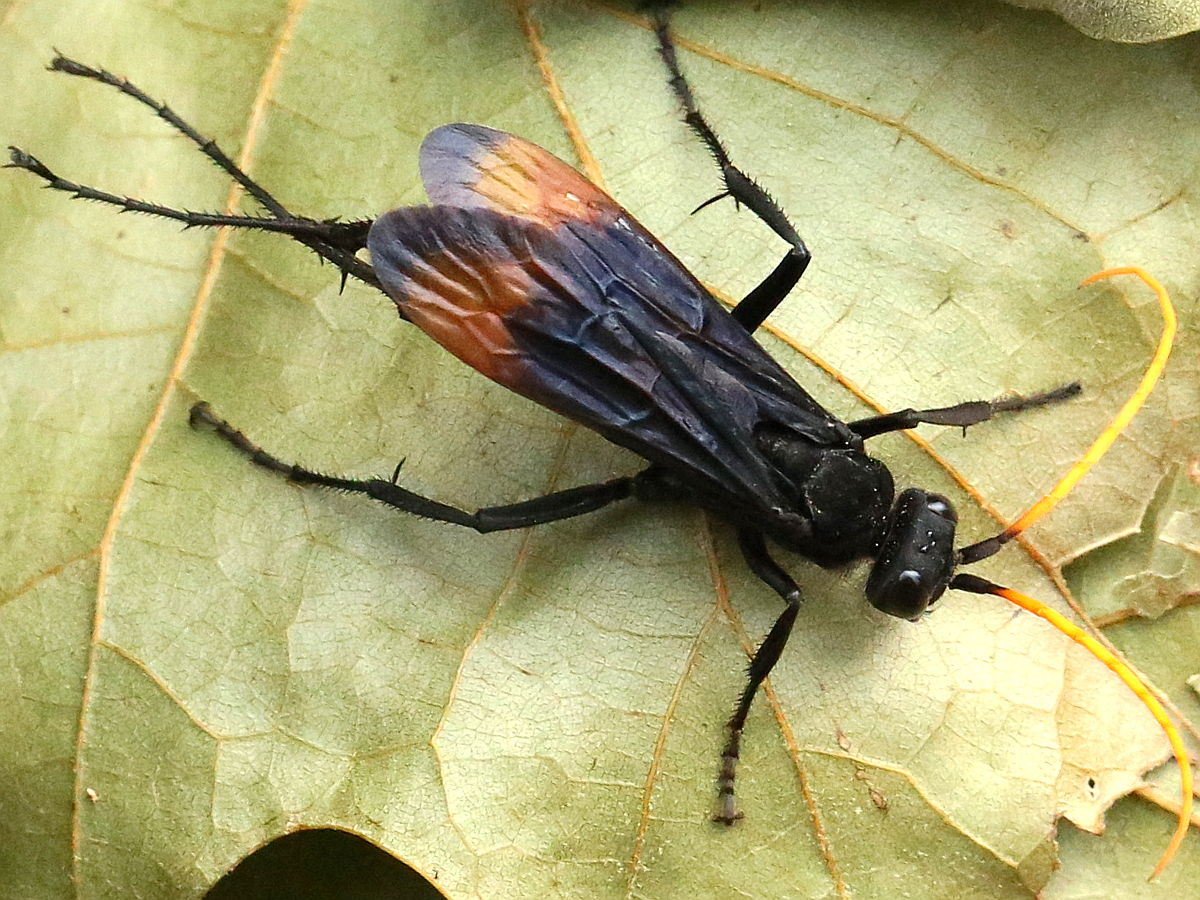
- Entypus unifasciatus unifasciatus

Scientific classification
- Kingdom: Animalia
- Phylum: Arthropoda
- Clade: Pancrustacea
- Class: Insecta
- Order: Hymenoptera
- Family: Pompilidae
- Genus: Entypus
- Species: E. unifasciatus

Binomial name
- Entypus unifasciatus (Say, 1828)

= Entypus unifasciatus =

Species of wasp

Entypus unifasciatus is a species of spider wasp in the family Pompilidae.

== Description ==
Theses spider wasps are black with a bluish sheen, yellow antennae, and wings ranging from mostly orange to mostly black with an orange band near the apex.

== Range ==
Entypus unifasciatus occurs from transcontinental North America, except in the northwest, to South America.

== Ecology ==
Female wasps paralyze large spiders and deposit them in burrows. The wasp lays a fertilized egg upon the spider; after hatching, the larva feeds on the living but paralyzed spider until maturing into a pupa that overwinters, and emerges as a winged adult next summer.

== Taxonomy ==
Entypus unifasciatus contains the following subspecies:

- Entypus unifasciatus californicus (Townes, 1957)
- Entypus unifasciatus cressoni (Banks, 1929)
- Entypus unifasciatus dumosus (Spinola, 1851)
- Entypus unifasciatus unifasciatus (Say, 1828)

== Gallery ==
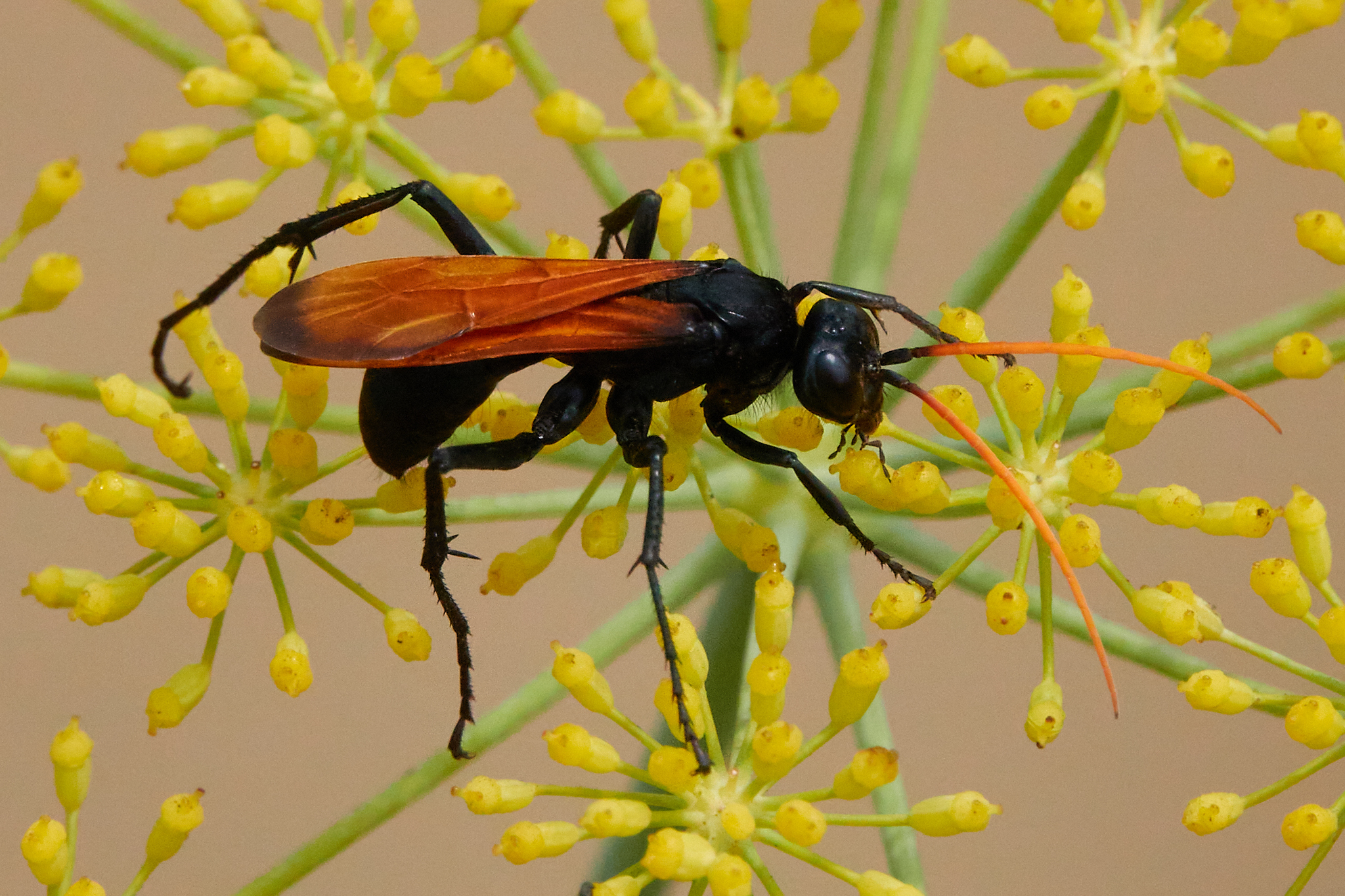
Entypus unifasciatus californicus

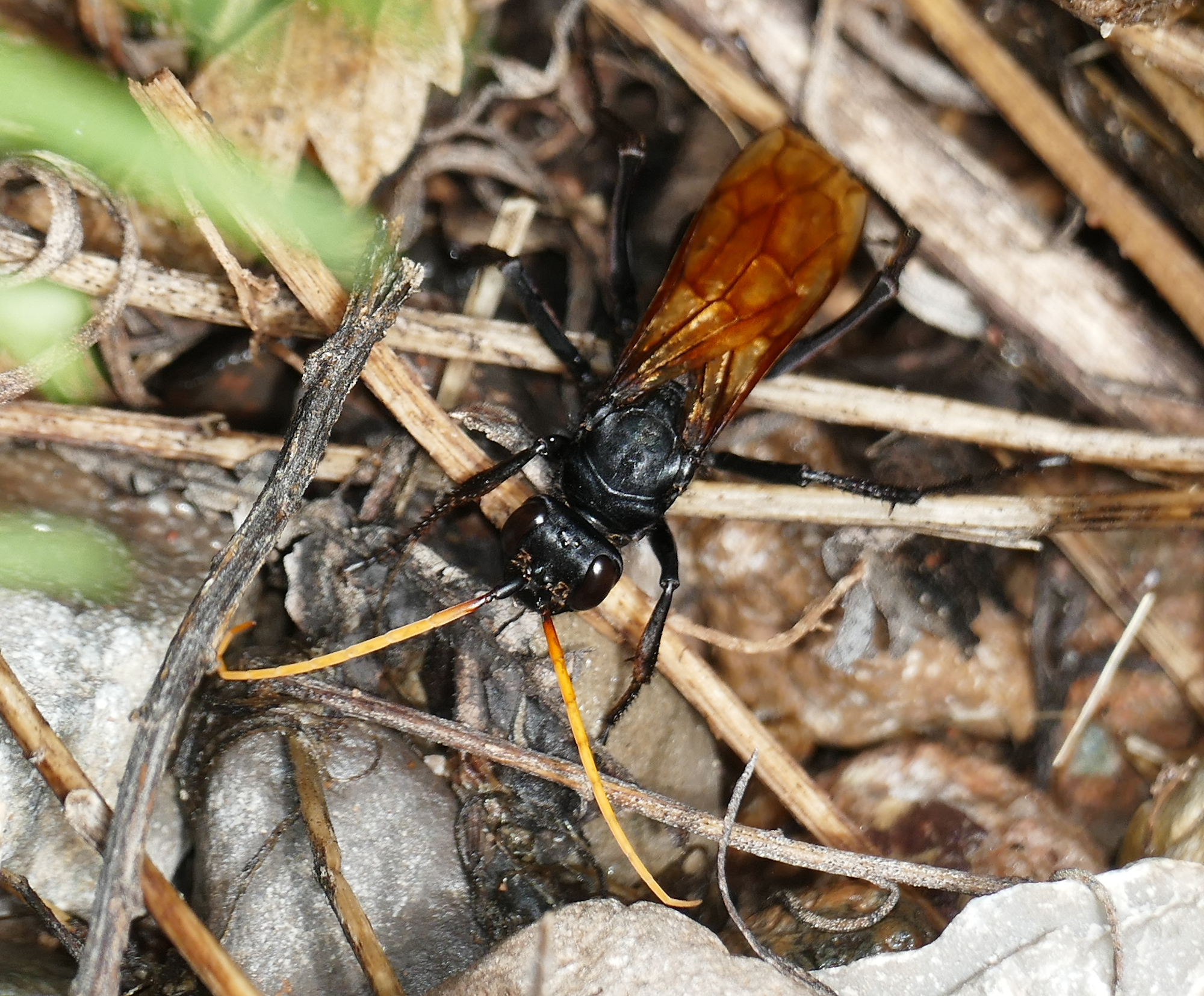
Entypus unifasciatus cressoni

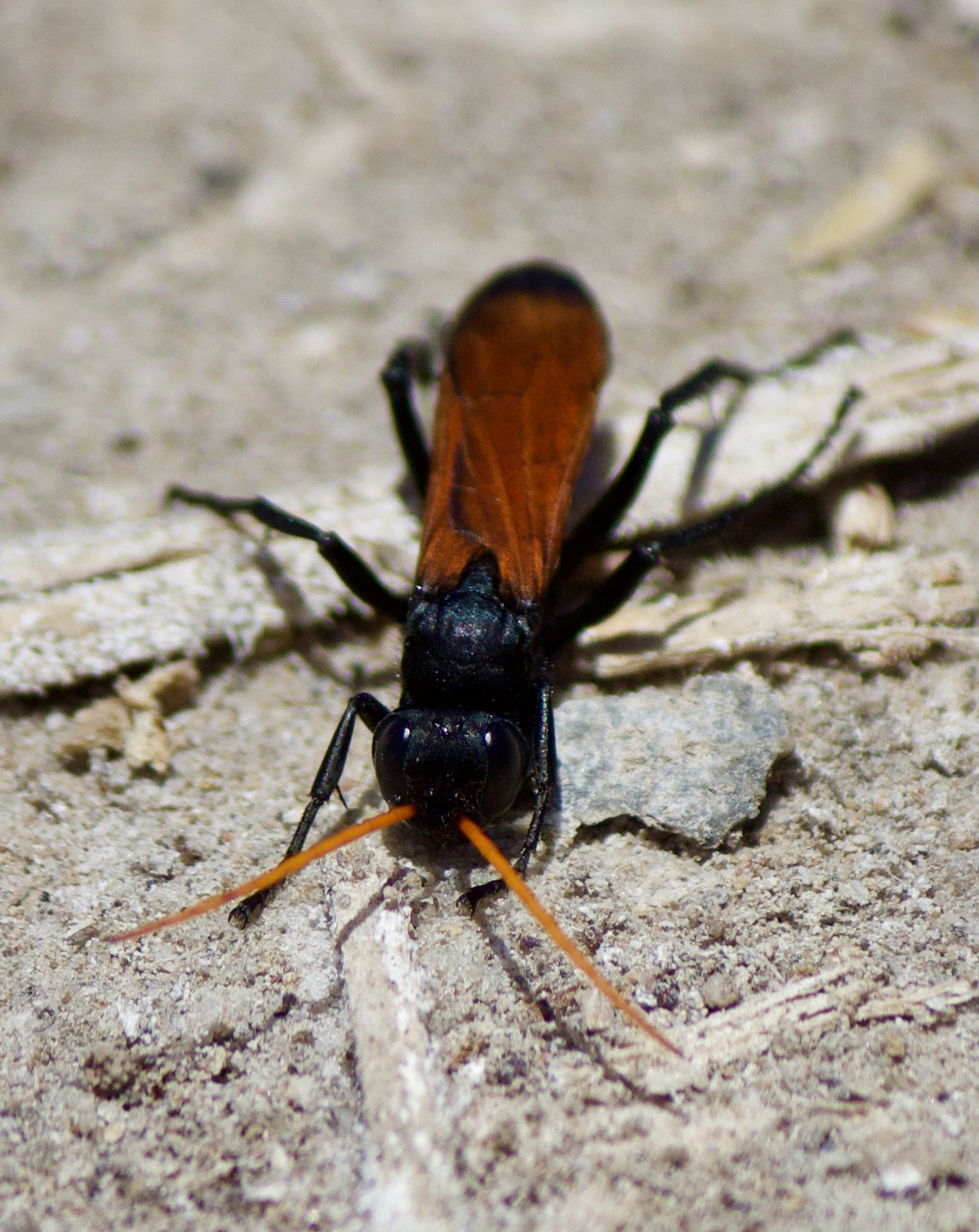
Entypus unifasciatus dumosus

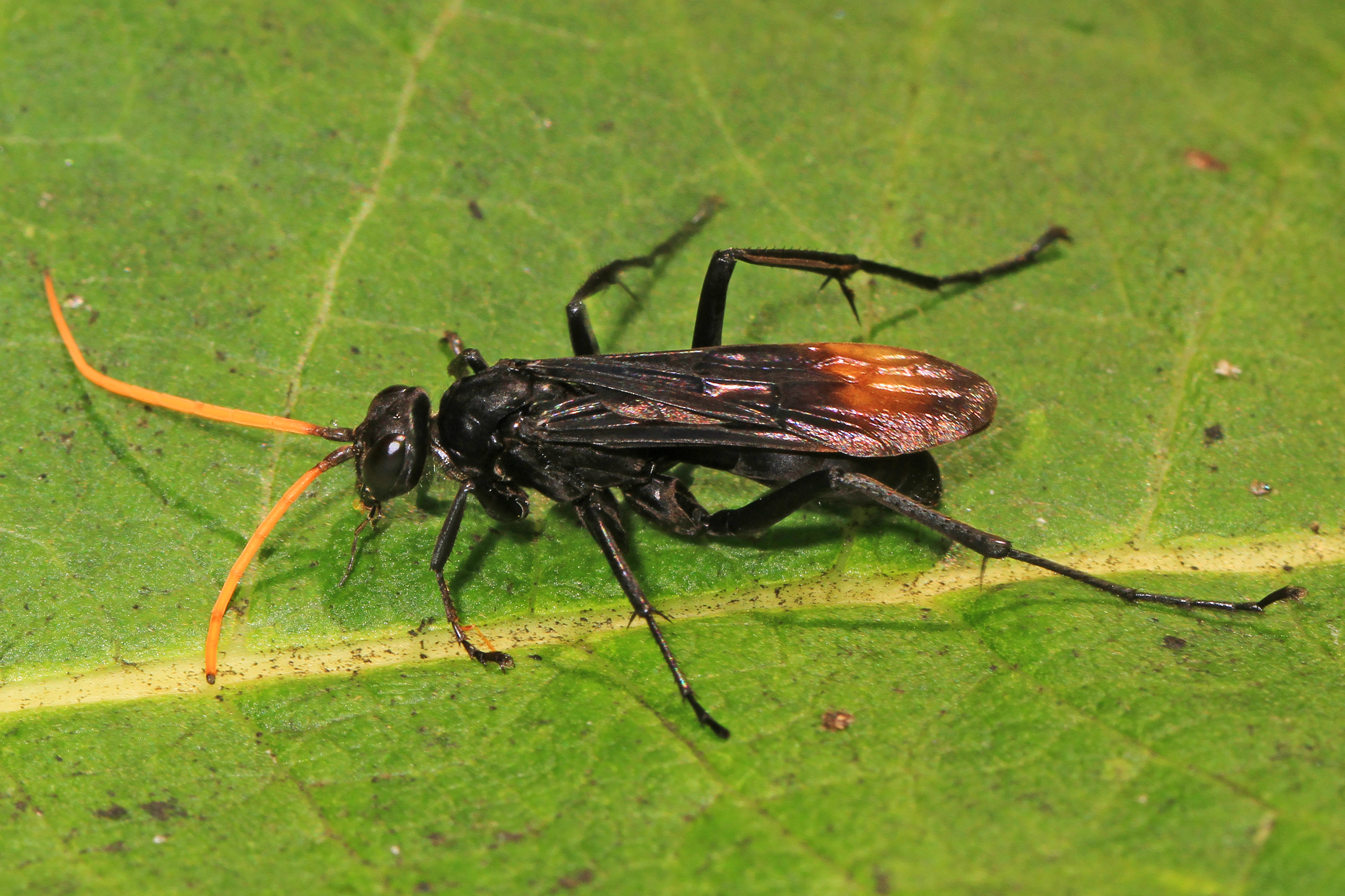
Entypus unifasciatus unifasciatus
