= Schizocosa minnesotensis =

Scientific classification
- Kingdom: Animalia
- Phylum: Arthropoda
- Subphylum: Chelicerata
- Class: Arachnida
- Order: Araneae
- Infraorder: Araneomorphae
- Family: Lycosidae
- Genus: Schizocosa
- Species: S. minnesotensis

Binomial name
- Schizocosa minnesotensis (Gertsch, 1934)

Species of spider

Schizocosa minnesotensis is a species of wolf spider in the family Lycosidae. It is found in the United States and Canada.
