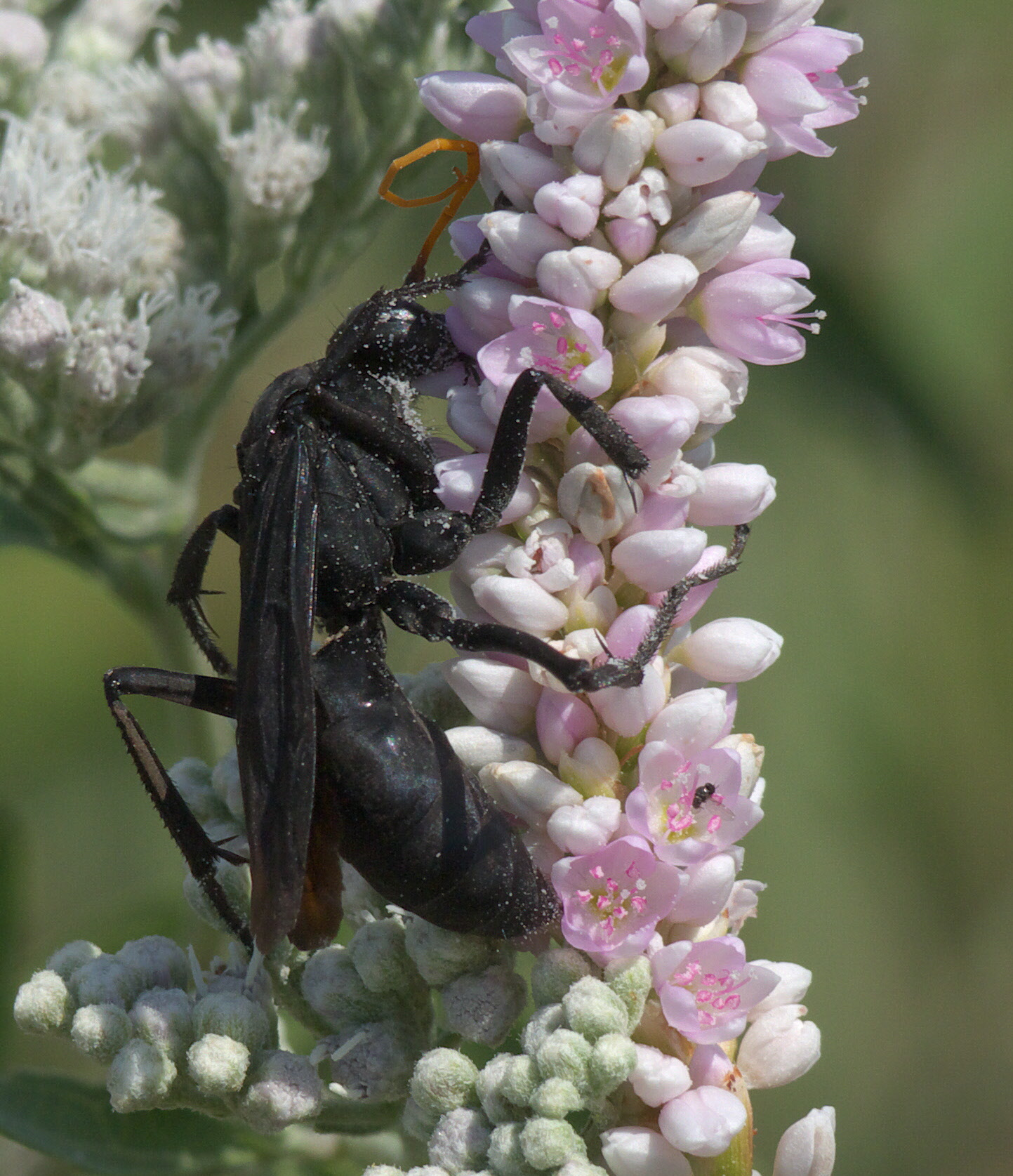

Scientific classification
- Domain: Eukaryota
- Kingdom: Animalia
- Phylum: Arthropoda
- Class: Insecta
- Order: Hymenoptera
- Family: Pompilidae
- Subfamily: Pepsinae
- Genus: Entypus; Dahlbom, 1843

Type species
- Entypus ochrocerus Dahlbom, 1844

= Entypus =

Genus of wasps

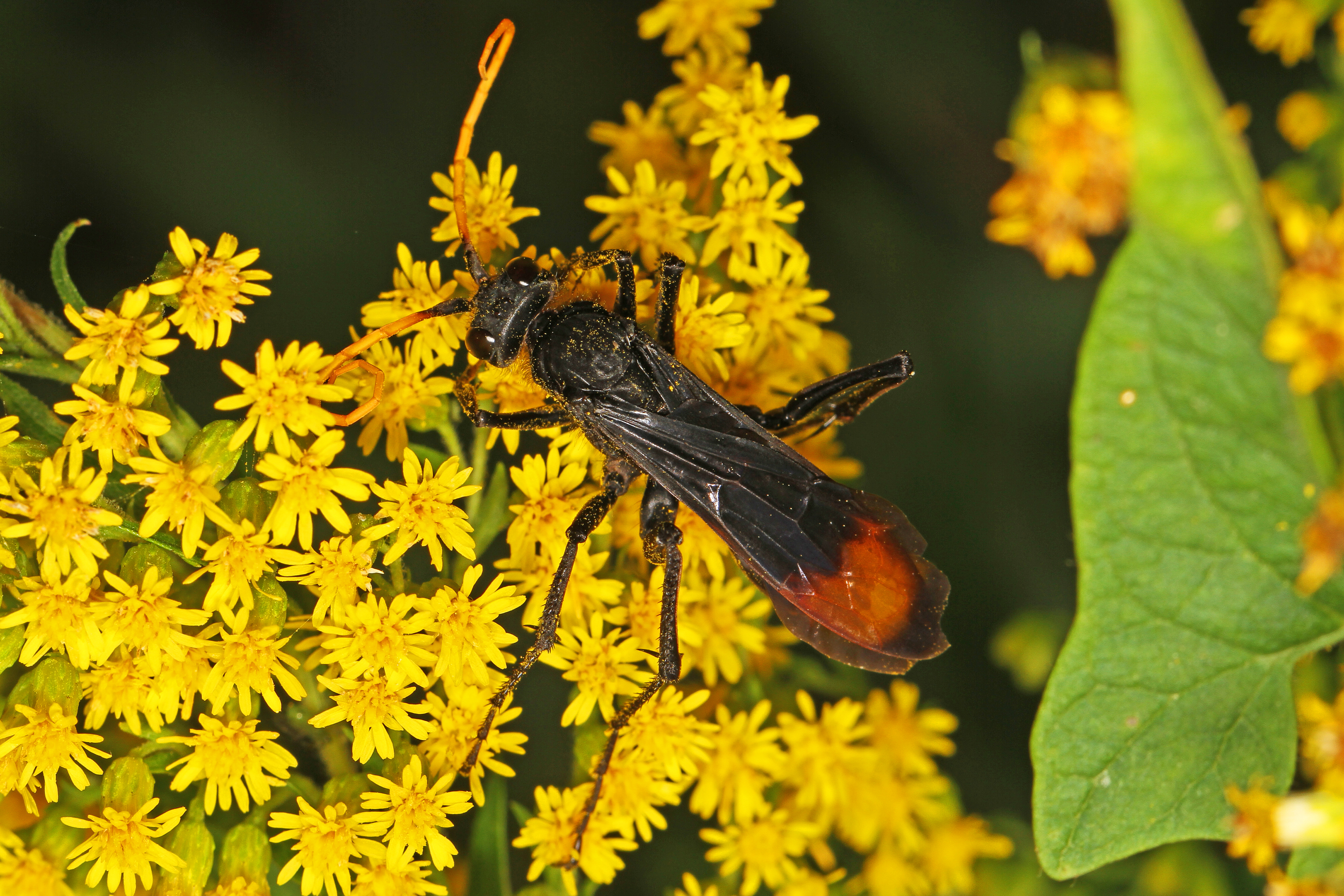
Entypus unifasciatus

Entypus is a genus of spider wasps in the family Pompilidae. There are at least 40 described species in Entypus.

== Species ==
These 38 species belong to the genus Entypus:

- Entypus angusticeps (Townes, 1957)
- Entypus aratus (Townes, 1957)
- Entypus aurifrons (Banks, 1946)
- Entypus bituberculatus (Guerin, 1838)
- Entypus bonariensis (Lepeletier, 1845)
- Entypus brasiliensis (Taschenberg, 1869)
- Entypus caerulans (Lepeletier, 1845)
- Entypus caerulea (Linnaeus, 1758)
- Entypus carinatus (Fox)
- Entypus castanea (Palisot de Beauvois, 1809)
- Entypus cephalotes Saussure, 1868
- Entypus coeruleus (Taschenberg, 1869)
- Entypus concolorans Roig-Alsina, 1981
- Entypus crassiceps Roig-Alsina, 1981
- Entypus decoloratus (Lepeletier, 1845)
- Entypus ecuadorensis (Cameron)
- Entypus ferruginipennis (Haliday, 1837)
- Entypus fossulatus (Giner Marí, 1944)
- Entypus fulvicornis (Cresson, 1867)
- Entypus gigas (Fabricius, 1804)
- Entypus grandis (Banks, 1946)
- Entypus iheringi (Fox, 1899)
- Entypus lepelletierii (Guérin, 1831)
- Entypus luteicornis (Lepeletier, 1845)
- Entypus magnus (Cresson, 1867)
- Entypus mammillatus (Fox, 1897)
- Entypus manni (Banks, 1928)
- Entypus molestus (Banks, 1946)
- Entypus nitidus (Banks, 1946)
- Entypus ochrocerus Dahlbom, 1843
- Entypus perpunctatus (Fox, 1897)
- Entypus persimilis (Banks, 1946)
- Entypus peruvianus (Rohwer, 1913)
- Entypus purpureipes (Cameron)
- Entypus sulphureicornis (Palisot de Beauvois, 1809)
- Entypus unifasciatus (Say, 1828)
- Entypus urichi (Banks, 1945)
- Entypus velutinus (Taschenberg, 1869)
