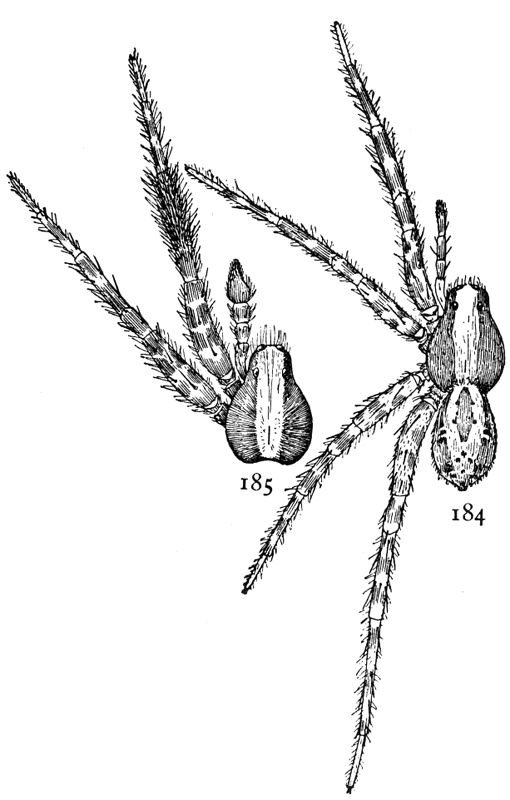

Scientific classification
- Kingdom: Animalia
- Phylum: Arthropoda
- Subphylum: Chelicerata
- Class: Arachnida
- Order: Araneae
- Infraorder: Araneomorphae
- Family: Lycosidae
- Genus: Schizocosa
- Species: S. ocreata

Binomial name
- Schizocosa ocreata (Hentz, 1844)

= Schizocosa ocreata =

Species of spider

Schizocosa ocreata is a species of wolf spider in the family Lycosidae that is found in North America. The Schizocosa ocreata is a spider that is most commonly known as the “brush-legged wolf spider” because of the distinct dark-colored fur-like coverings around the front legs of males. The S. ocreata are commonly found in North American states, usually in the middle and eastern United States.

They are predated, typically in areas of large forestry, by many organisms that are visually acute such as various birds, the American toad (Anaxyrus americanus), and other large organisms. Similarly to other species, these spiders do not actually produce webs, but depend on their other acute senses, such as vision, to still exhibit elements of exploitative competition.

Some interesting aspects of the S. ocreata are the female and male dynamics during mating and post-copulation. Females will frequently aggressively try to kill the males after mating and cause the males to use their venom as a mechanism of defense. Effects of early juvenile infection on the immunity of these spiders as adults are also currently being studied.

Males that were exposed to P. aeruginosa as a juvenile were more likely to have higher adult encapsulation rates as well as have an increased density of melanization. The process of melanization is a key element in immunity because this process produces melanin and aids in wound healing by activating prophenoloxidase.

The only spiders that are currently classified as “venomous spiders” by the Mayo Clinic include the black widow spider and the brown recluse spider; however, S. ocreata spiders are not definitively harmless. Hence, it is important to seek medical attention if you are unsure of the kind of spider bite you have, feel respiratory distress, or are in severe pain.

== Description ==
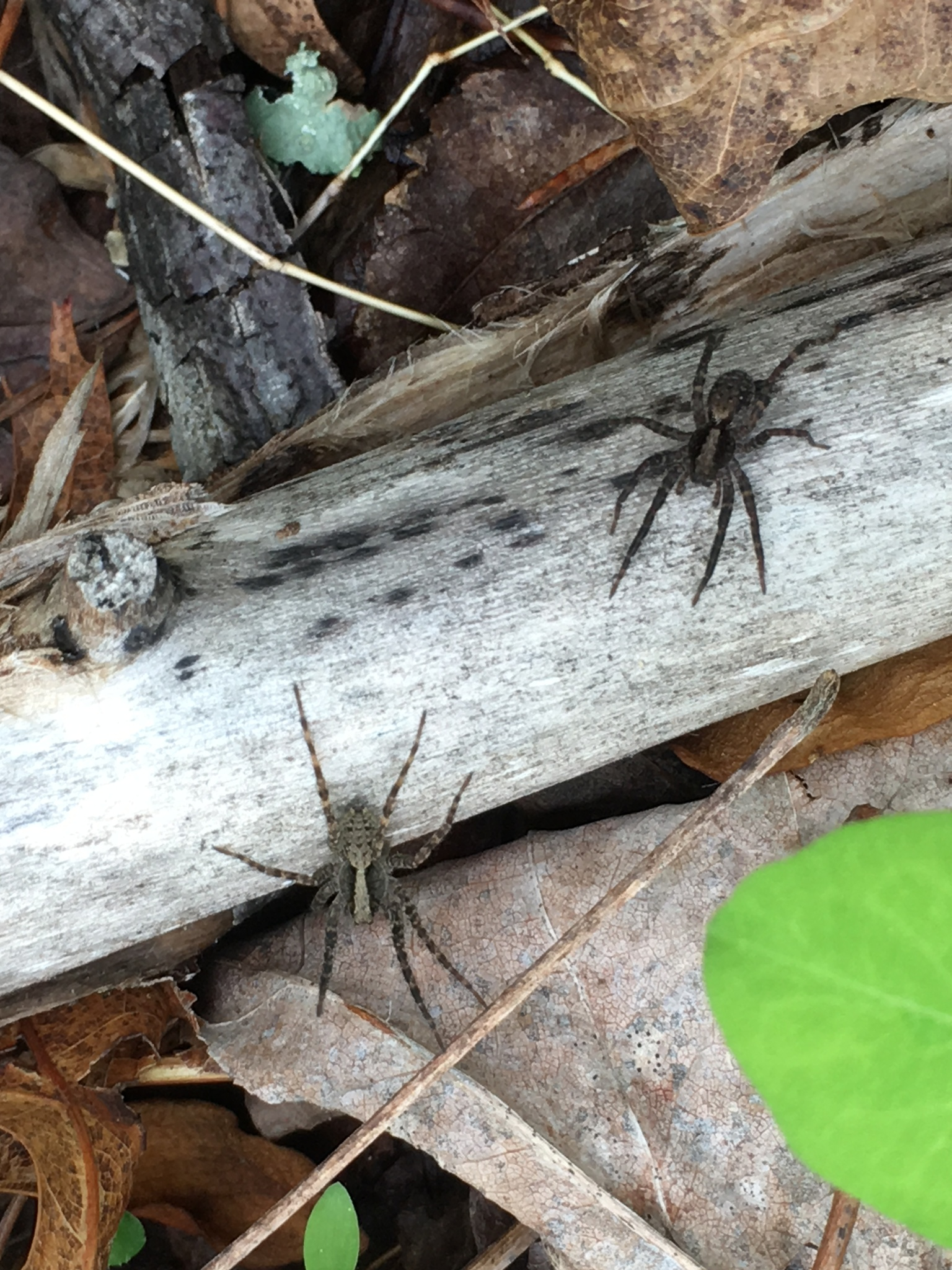
Two Schizocosa ocreata in Prince William County, Virginia, US

The S. ocreata has dark furry legs that distinguish this spider from other spiders in the Schizocosa genus. In addition, the tufts of bristle pair on the male is a secondary sexual characteristic that is the only physical feature that distinguishes this spider from its sibling species.

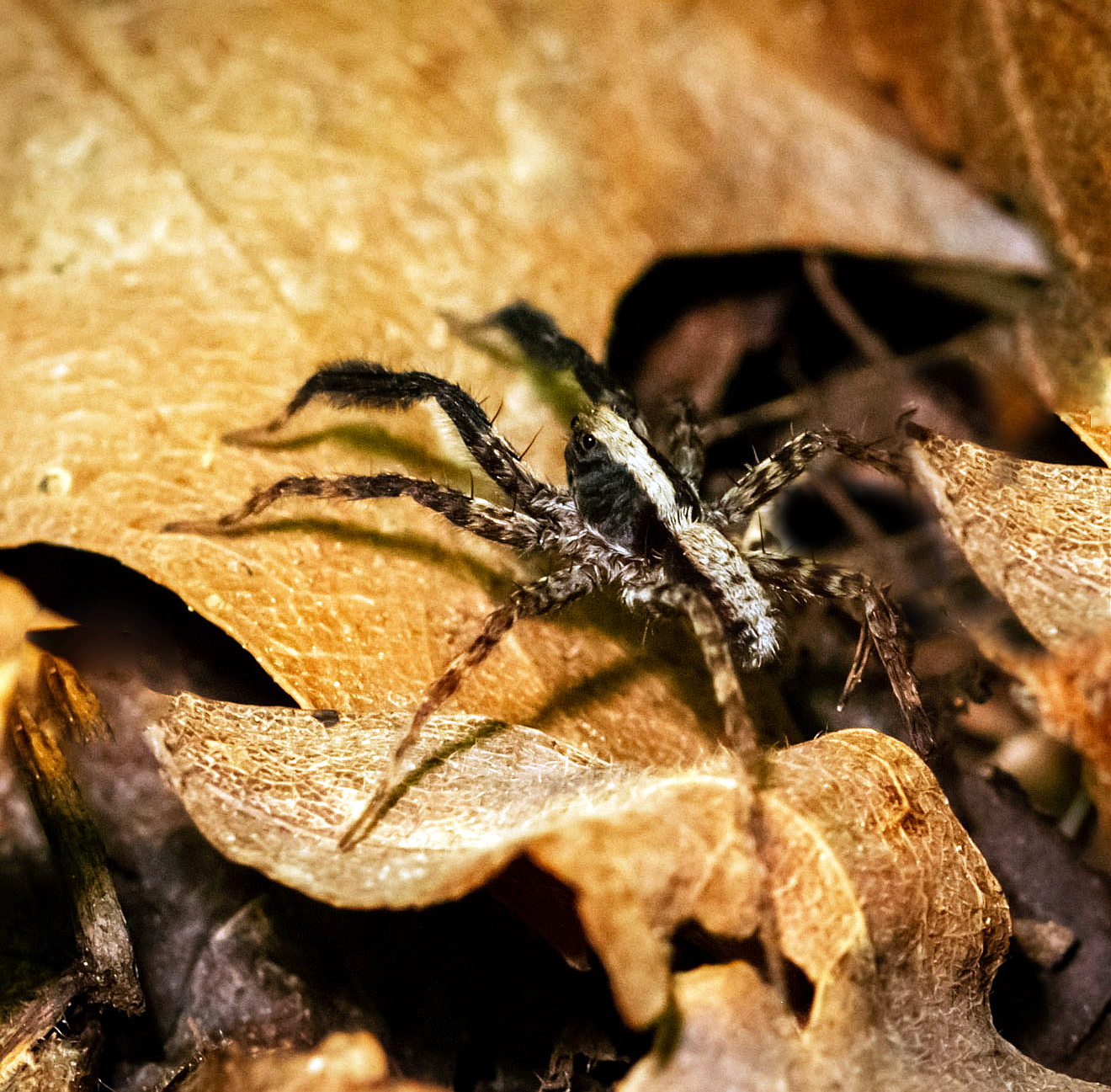
Brush-legged wolf spider

== Taxonomy ==
S. ocreata was first described in 1844 by Nicholas Marcellus Hentz who placed the species in the Lycosa genus. The species was moved to the Schizocosa genus when it was erected in 1904 by Ralph Vary Chamberlin at which point its subspecies "Lycosa" ocreata pulchra was synonymized with S. bilineata.

== Diet ==
The S. ocreata’s diet mainly includes crickets (Acheta domesticus), many different insect species, and the Collembola, but it was found that diet can largely impact sexual behaviors as well. Females that were well-fed actually were a lot more receptive to the males during mating, while those that had limited food were much less receptive. A large amount of food available for consumption is thought to help aid the spiders to allocate their resources and energy to reproductive success.

== Webs ==
The S. ocreata wolf spiders do not make webs but do capture prey in different ways. There is usually limited food for the spiders that are found to build webs and wander. But, the spiders that do not build webs, such as the Schizocosa ocreata, show signs that they utilize exploitative competition in order to capture prey. Exploitative competition is when are not interacting directly with other individuals but instead compete by taking resources and decreasing the amount available to other individuals.

== Reproduction and life cycle ==
=== Molting ===
During the process of molting, old outer layers of an animal are shed to allow for new growth to occur. This molting process is an important element for the animal to become sexually developed as well, and it was found to be an important process for the S. ocreata.

In addition, the process of molting, gonad development, and reproductive timing in females is all impacted by the female spiders’ feeding history. There is much variation in the number of instars, the time for development, the width of the cephalothorax, and mass varied with different dietary patterns. Instars refer to the phases between two molting periods when an invertebrate animal develops into sexual maturity. The females that were well-fed actually needed more moltings to become sexually mature, needed less time for sexual development and were found to be heavier than those that were starved long-term.

A common behavior for S. ocreata spiders is self-amputation in order to regenerate a damaged limb. However, the spiders that had regenerating legs needed about an additional 3.7 days to molt. Although the spiders that had regenerating legs need additional time to molt, when talking about the number of additional moltings that are needed, these spiders usually only need one more molting.

=== Lifespan ===
The development of the S. ocreata spiders closely resembles most spiders; they start as an egg and develop physically into mini versions of their parents and live for a couple of years. They undergo multiple shedding of their skin throughout development and eventually undergo sexual development in order to reproduce and lay eggs. However, the eggs that the females lay are very much affected by the females’ diet history too. The number as well as the diameter of eggs was compared between well-fed females and food-limited females. It was found that the females treated with a low diet had lower egg numbers and both smaller egg diameter and volume than the well-fed females.

== Mating behavior ==
=== Mate searching behavior ===
Cuticular hydrocarbons, which cover the cuticles on insects and are waterproof, have been discovered to play a major role as a sex pheromone in spiders. The chemical cues that the female S. ocreata uses contain information that is species-specific and are able to communicate their own mating status. This signal is also able to reveal the history of what they have eaten in order to present their honest states. Although the chemical cues tell a lot about the state of the female, there is no current research done to conclude that the male chemical cues can exhibit signals.

Female S. ocreata spiders were more receptive to the males they were more familiar with. Since males are the only ones that have tufts, which is the area on the forelegs covered in bristles, the usage of the multifactorial approach revealed how the female preferences are decided. The male’s tuft size phenotype is a significant factor that predicts how females will choose. Hence, females that were more exposed to the small-tufted males were more likely to be receptive to the small-tufted males. But, females that were more exposed to large-tufted males were more likely to be receptive to the large-tufted males. But, females are slightly more selective in that, in general, they have increased preferences for the large-tufted males more than the small-tufted male. For the species S. ocreata, the males that are smaller in size tend to be at more risk to be attacked and cannibalized. Additionally, the species' females will attack the males with smaller tufts. The males with the larger leg tufts are able to have increased chances of mating as well.

In addition to the effects of exposures on the choosiness of female during mating, the rate of courtship may also be attributed to males' eavesdropping behaviors. Males are more likely to exhibit courtship behaviors when there is a video showing another male also exhibiting courtship activities. These courting behaviors are not exhibited by S. ocreata spiders when the video is of a male that is simply walking (or non-courting). The male spiders are able to know where the females are simply by eavesdropping on the males that are close-by. However, these findings are only suggesting a possible eavesdropping behavior by the male spiders since the other male being eavesdropped on was only on a video screen.

=== Female/male interactions ===
There are two main types of approaches to copulation between the male and female spiders. The two types are either coercive or cooperative. The males would sometimes use their fang-like teeth to scar and mark the females during copulation. Scar tissues were detected in the area below the cephalothorax, but above the coxa of the leg in females. This scarred area was consistent with the part of the female’s body that the males attached their fangs on. The control, the group where virgin females were studied, showed no scar tissues on the area below the cephalothorax.

=== Sexual cannibalism ===
The S. ocreata females can exhibit aggressive behavior towards the male after copulation. But, if they become too aggressive, the male spiders will inject them with venom in order to reduce the possibility of post-mating cannibalism, where the females would attack and eat the males.

Even though it’s unknown how much impact the venom injections have on the females, there is a possibility that there is a cost for the male’s future reproductive success as well. The death of a female due to the injection of the male venom could impact them in some way that we do not yet know about.

== Enemies ==
=== Predators ===
Some of the predators of the S. ocreata are organisms that are very visually keen and able to come from above the spiders, such as various bird species. The American toad (Anaxyrus americanus) and other large organisms also prey on the S. ocreata as well.

=== Immunity ===
When various pathogens enter the S. ocreata, they have immunological mechanisms within their system to fight them off. However, it is still unclear the mechanism with which the S. ocreata is able to reduce the immunological inflammation and responses. In order to test whether the S. ocreata has immune functions, bacterial derivatives like lipopolysaccharide (LPS) were injected to elicit immune responses. But, an issue with studies like these is that most spiders actually are exposed to various bacteria through oral ingestion. Spiders also digest their food externally, so therefore enzymes are being secreted externally, which causes the food to be broken down outside of their body. Much of the research studies reveal that a lot of spiders have antimicrobial peptides (AMPs) to the gram-negative bacteria, gram-positive bacteria, and fungi. These AMPs are found mainly in hemocytes and sub-esophageal nerves.

When male S. ocreata spiders ingested around 600 Colony Forming Units/microliter, it was found that the spiders only had 291 Colony Forming Units in 3 microliters of their hemolymph. Hence, this suggested that there potentially is an immune system that works to prevent the ingested pathogens from getting into the hemolymph, which is the blood equivalent in most invertebrates. The CFU count in the hemolymph system shows that the spiders’ immune functions are working in some aspects to reduce the pathogens. However, further research needs to be done to determine the definite mechanism for how this occurs.

=== Parasites ===
It was also found that adult males that had experience with a bacterial infection in their juvenile days, actually had a stronger response to encapsulation when measured as an adult. Encapsulation is a type of immune response that is dependent on phenoloxidase; it’s widely used as a defense against macro-parasites. However, encapsulation response strength was found to be significantly higher in males who had previous juvenile exposure. But this does not mean that all immune responses are stronger.

== Protective coloration and behavior ==
These spiders fight off attacks from their own species (ie. male fighting off female aggression after copulation), but they also have different techniques of protective coloration and ways of fighting different predators off as well. The courting males of the brush-legged wolf spider, Schizocosa ocreata, actually use their colorations to gain mates. But, their coloration and behavior heavily interact with one another. Since color helps them to be detected, the spiders that are in the state of courting are able to be detected at a much faster rate than the spiders that are simply walking. The stationary spiders, or those that are not moving, are detected much less than both the walking and courting spiders. But, the “freezing” technique, which is representative of the stationary spider, is a highly effective tactic when faced with predators.

In addition, the S. ocreata has a large stripe on the dorsal area of their body, which allows them to overlap visually with their territory and the dark color in the lateral area aids in providing some level of crypticity and protection from predators that are physically above them. Since behavior and predation are innately related, behavioral plasticity is important for reducing predation by those that have acute vision.

== Physiology ==
=== Locomotion ===
The spiders that are courting move down a more winding path and also utilize their abdomens to move as well as use their legs. Although both the courting and walking spiders move in a similar way, the courting spiders tend to spend more time moving than the walking spiders. The courting spiders’ forelegs are also almost always constantly in motion. But, when there is loss of haemolymph fluids, that could also lead to reduced mobility.

=== Digestion ===
These spiders use an external digestive system; they secrete the enzymes to digest the food, not within their gut, but outside themselves. These spiders have an exoskeleton, but when they have damage to their exoskeleton, there is a loss of haemolymph which can end up being consequential. A constant supply of blood volume will be needed for hydraulic locomotion, which is the process through which increased pressure in fluids from their cephalothorax stretch out their legs, and may cause reduced mobility.

== Bites to humans ==
=== Venom ===
The only spiders that are found to have medically significant bites in the United States are the black widow and the brown recluse. Allergic reactions may still occur or develop from any spider bites. National Institute for Occupational Safety and Health.

=== Signs and symptoms ===
Prompt medical care should be sought if one is unsure whether the bite was from a venomous spider or not and if severe pain develops, or if problems with breathing occurs.
