= Schizocosa darlingi =

Zimbabwe Schizosa wolf spider

Scientific classification
- Kingdom: Animalia
- Phylum: Arthropoda
- Subphylum: Chelicerata
- Class: Arachnida
- Order: Araneae
- Infraorder: Araneomorphae
- Family: Lycosidae
- Genus: Schizocosa
- Species: S. darlingi

Binomial name
- Schizocosa darlingi (Pocock, 1898)

Synonyms
- Lycosa darlingii Pocock, 1898; Avicosa darlingi Roewer, 1955

Species of spider

Schizocosa darlingi is a species of spider in the family Lycosidae. It is found in southern Africa and is commonly known as the Zimbabwe Schizosa wolf spider.

== Distribution ==
Schizocosa darlingi is found in Botswana, Namibia, Zimbabwe, and South Africa.

In South Africa, it is recorded from KwaZulu-Natal and Limpopo. Notable locations include Hluhluwe Nature Reserve and Estcourt in KwaZulu-Natal, and Rust de Winter in Limpopo.

== Habitat and ecology ==
Schizocosa darlingi is a free-running ground dweller. The species inhabits the Grassland and Savanna biomes at altitudes ranging from 119 to 1189 m. It has also been sampled from cotton fields.

== Conservation ==
Schizocosa darlingi is listed as Least Concern by the South African National Biodiversity Institute due to its wide geographical range.

== Taxonomy ==
Schizocosa darlingi was originally described by Pocock in 1898 as Lycosa darlingii from Zimbabwe. The species has been reviewed by Roewer (1959) and is known from both sexes.
