= Schizocosa retrorsa =

Scientific classification
- Kingdom: Animalia
- Phylum: Arthropoda
- Subphylum: Chelicerata
- Class: Arachnida
- Order: Araneae
- Infraorder: Araneomorphae
- Family: Lycosidae
- Genus: Schizocosa
- Species: S. retrorsa

Binomial name
- Schizocosa retrorsa (Banks, 1911)

Species of spider

Schizocosa retrorsa is a species of wolf spider in the family Lycosidae. It is found in the United States and Mexico.
