= Schizocosa perplexa =

Scientific classification
- Domain: Eukaryota
- Kingdom: Animalia
- Phylum: Arthropoda
- Subphylum: Chelicerata
- Class: Arachnida
- Order: Araneae
- Infraorder: Araneomorphae
- Family: Lycosidae
- Genus: Schizocosa
- Species: S. perplexa

Binomial name
- Schizocosa perplexa Bryant, 1936

Species of wolf spider

Schizocosa perplexa is a species of wolf spider in the family Lycosidae. They can be found in North America in the United States of America, recorded in the literature from central Texas (around Dallas). In a revision of Nearctic Schizocosa encompassing the known species from the United States and Canada, Dondale & Redner (1978) only briefly listed this species under their section "Species excluded from the genus Schizocosa", but gave no further explanation for their viewpoint. It is not included a broad overview of spiders from the United States by Bradley, 2013.

== Description ==
Schizocosa perplexa Bryant, 1936 is a relatively small wolf spider with the body length of around 9.0 mm (0.35 in) for the male. The female remains to be described. The carapace color of the male was originally described as dark with a pale median band "light stripe", brown sides with black hairs, and no indications of a submarginal bands that extend to the margins. The dorsum of the abdomen has a demarcated heart mark ("spear mark") outlined with black dots, while the lateral areas are black, with long dark hairs. The ventral abdomen is dark with a narrow light median stripe and a few scattered light spots.

=== Similar species ===
Schizocosa perplexa and S. puebla Chamberlin, 1925 were compared by Bryant, 1936. S. puebla was described from New Mexico (Albuquerque) and have a slightly smaller body length of around 8.0 mm (0.31 in) for the male, and is said to be easily separated by the darker first leg, the palpal tibia shorter than the patella, and "very different palpus".

== Range ==
Schizocosa perplexa may have a wide range across the United States. Although only recorded in the scientific literature from central Texas (around Dallas), there are online observation records from Ohio.

== Habitat ==
Schizocosa perplexa are likely widespread in open habitats such as grasslands, as for many other wolf spiders in the United States.
