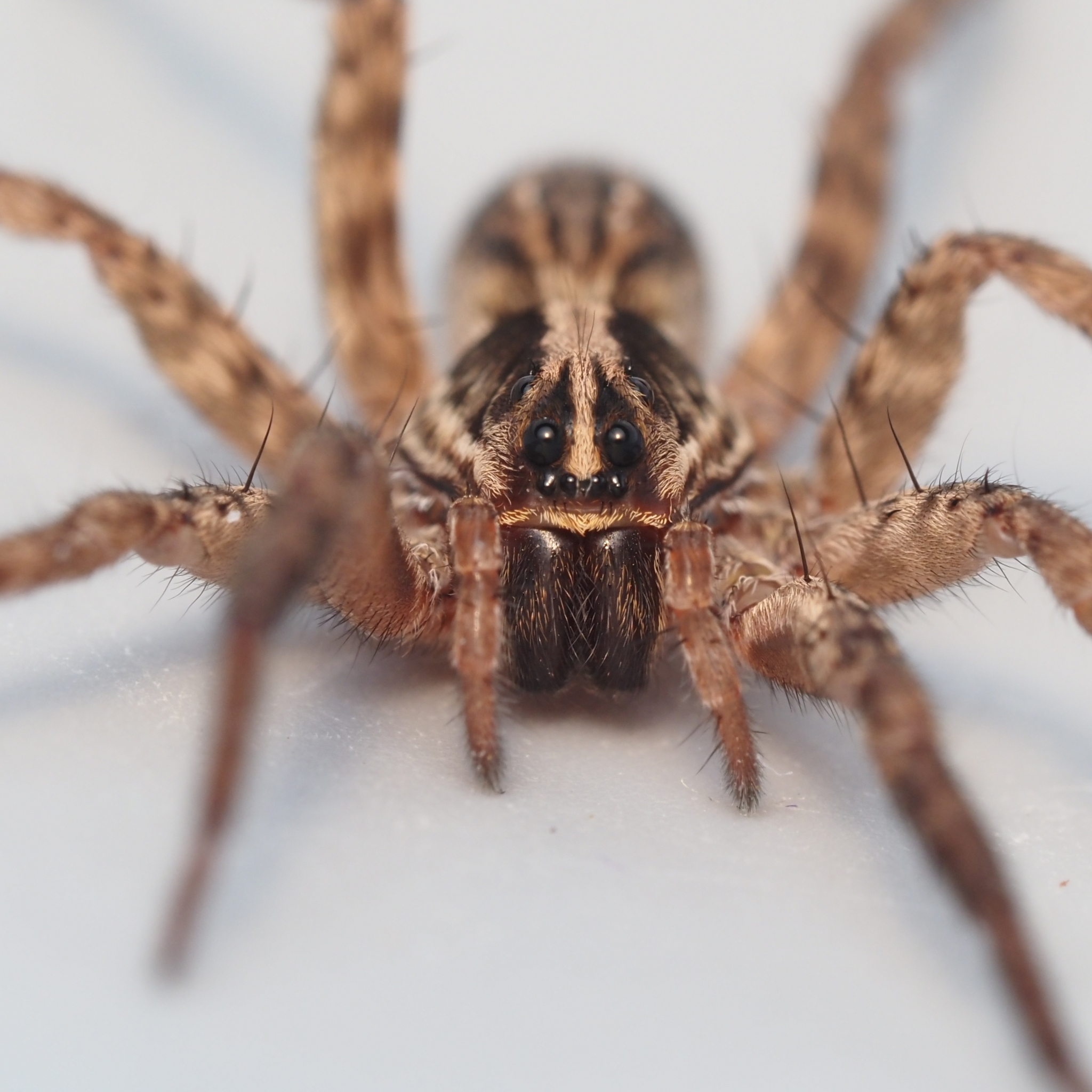
- S. avida
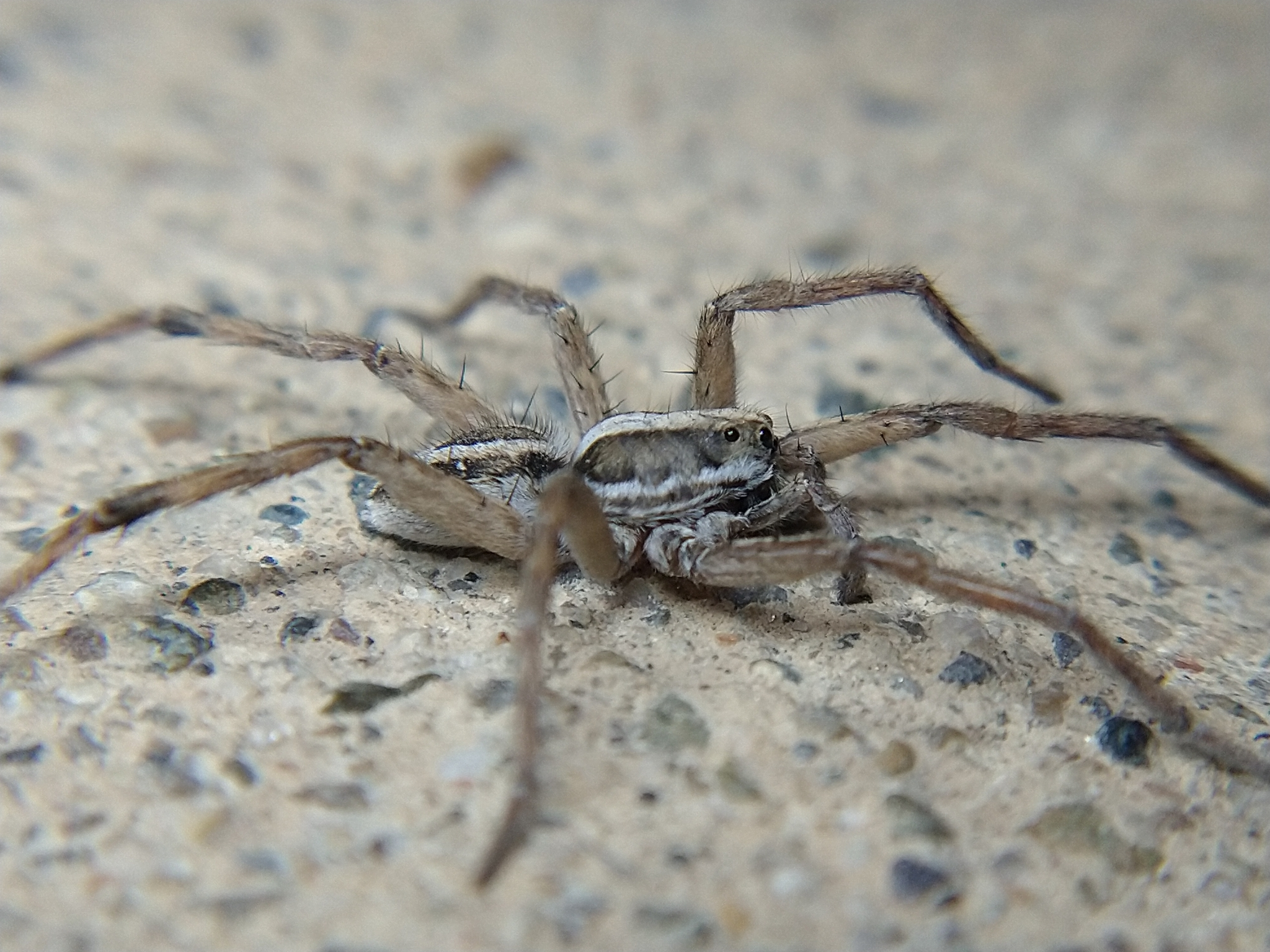
- S. mccooki

Scientific classification
- Kingdom: Animalia
- Phylum: Arthropoda
- Subphylum: Chelicerata
- Class: Arachnida
- Order: Araneae
- Infraorder: Araneomorphae
- Superfamily: Lycosoidea
- Family: Lycosidae
- Genus: Schizocosa; Chamberlin, 1904

Type species
- Lycosa ocreata Hentz, 1844

Species
- See text

Synonyms
- Avicosa Chamberlin & Ivie, 1942; Epihogna Roewer, 1960

= Schizocosa =

Genus of spiders

Schizocosa is a genus of wolf spiders (family Lycosidae) containing 56 species (as of 2025), distributed in North and South America, Africa, and East and Southeast Asia.

== Description ==
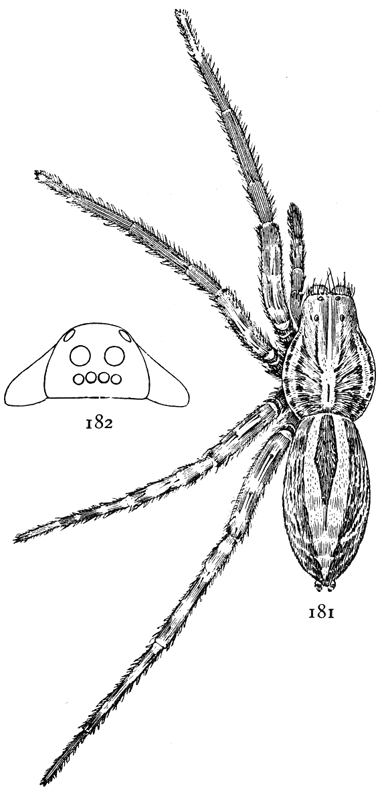
S. communis

Members of the genus Schizocosa are medium to large in size, usually ranging from 5 to 15 mm in body length, but potentially reaching as large as 28 mm. They are strong-legged spiders with relatively keen eyesight that carry their bodies high.

The carapace when viewed from above is truncate or somewhat concave at the posterior margin and smoothly convex along the lateral margins. It is narrowed and steeply sloped at the level of the first leg's coxa. When viewed laterally, the carapace is uniform in height from the dorsal groove to the level of the third row of eyes and slightly concave along the dorsal line.

The dorsal fovea is long, distinct, and shallow. The lateral areas are dark red-brown to nearly black, usually streaked with black, while pale submarginal bands are usually narrow but distinct and sometimes broken into spots. The eye area and the highest part of the carapace are black.

The eyes of the first row are uniform in size, or the anterior median eyes are slightly larger than the anterior lateral eyes. The first row of eyes is procurved and relatively narrow.

The abdomen in dorsal view is approximately ovoid, usually with a distinct dark heart mark that extends posteriorly one-half or more of the abdomen's length. The legs are moderately long and stout with strong macrosetae.

== Life style ==
Spiders in this genus are able to dart with great speed when pursuing prey or taking cover among the grasses which form their normal habitat. Individuals may wander long distances within a particular field or meadow.

In many species, mated females produce egg sacs in late spring or early summer and then guard or carry their egg sacs.

Distinct courting behaviors between species within Schizocosa may be resulting in assortative mating, where several species may co-exist within the same range without crossing genetic material.

== Species ==
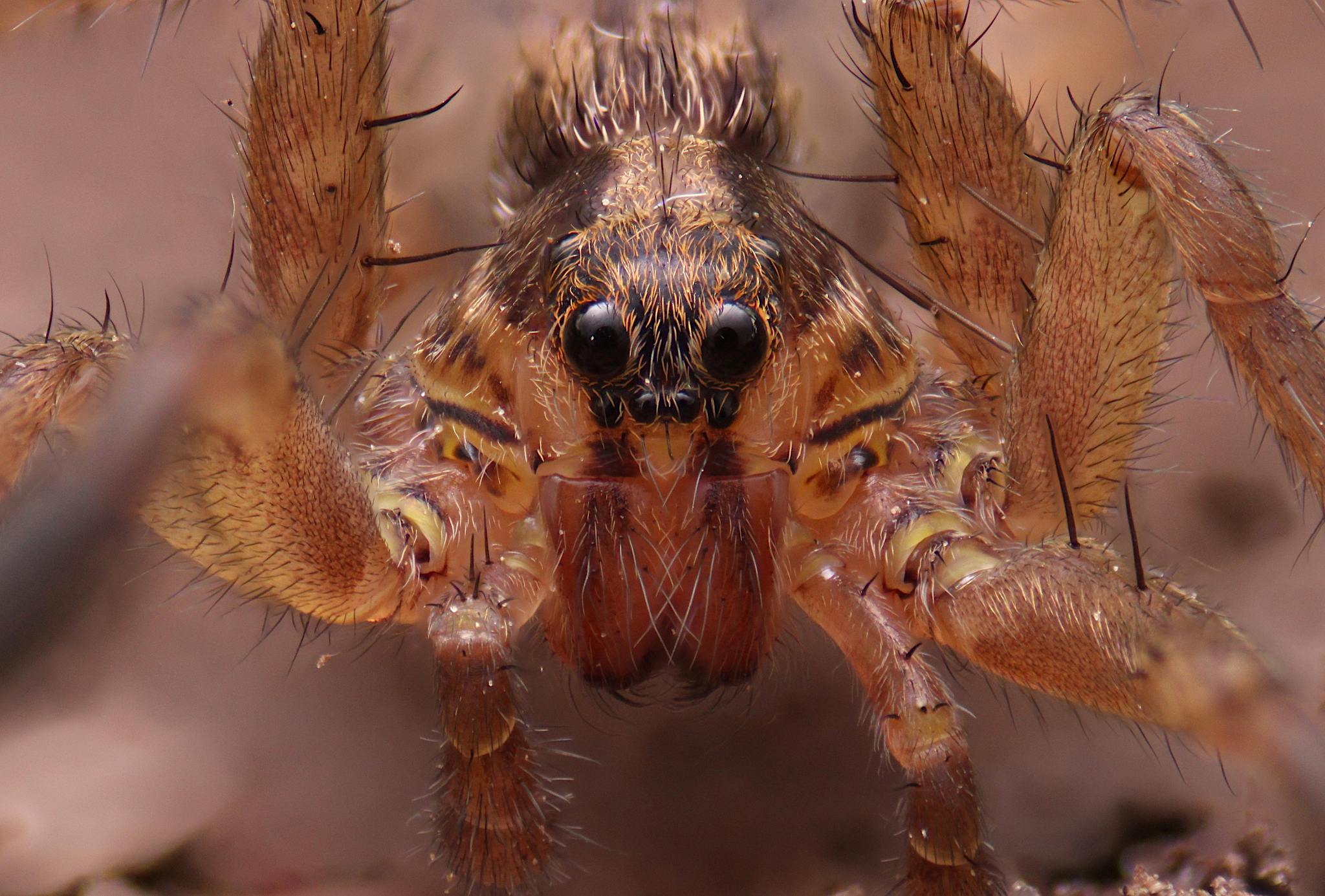
S. bilineata

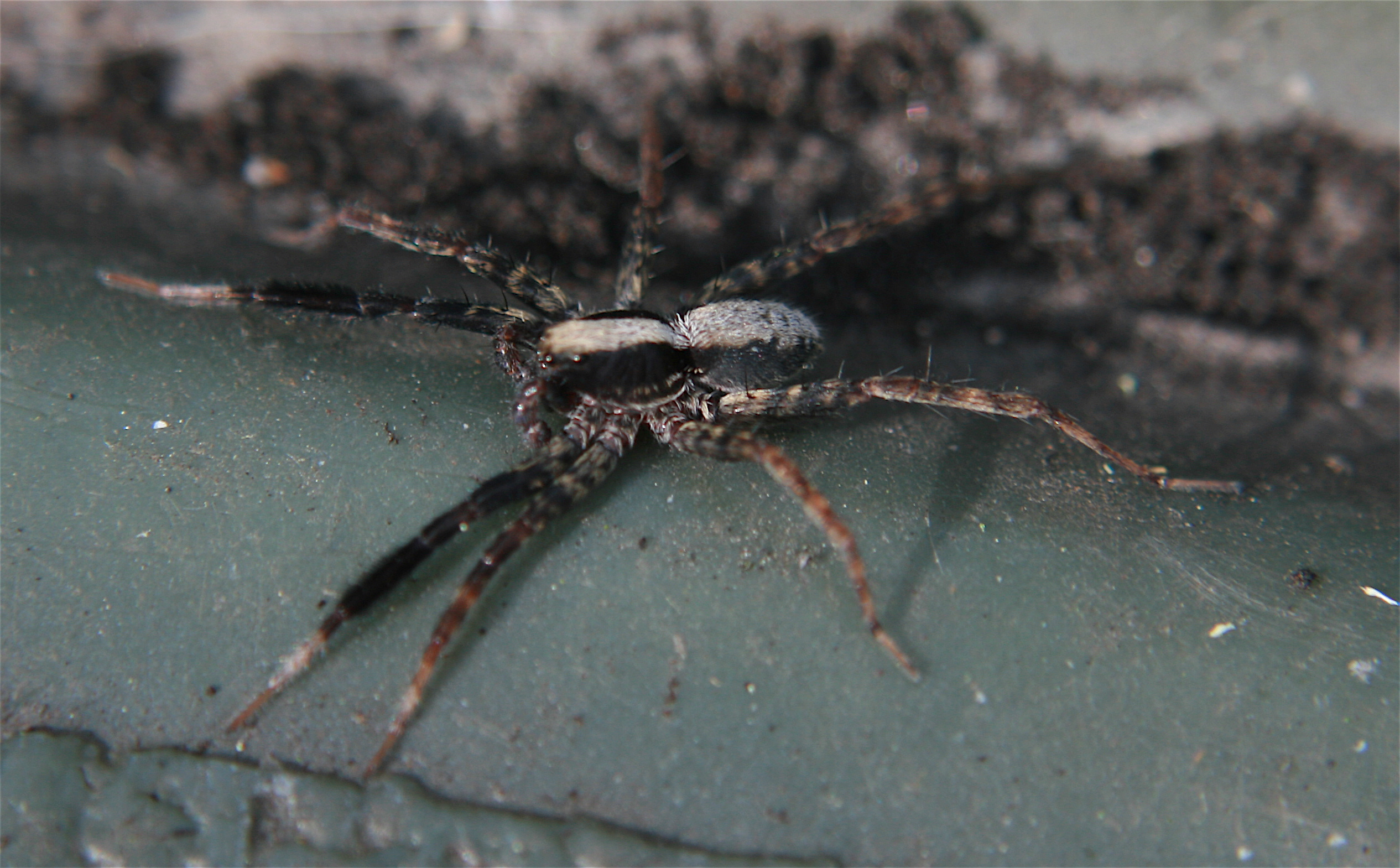
S. crassipes

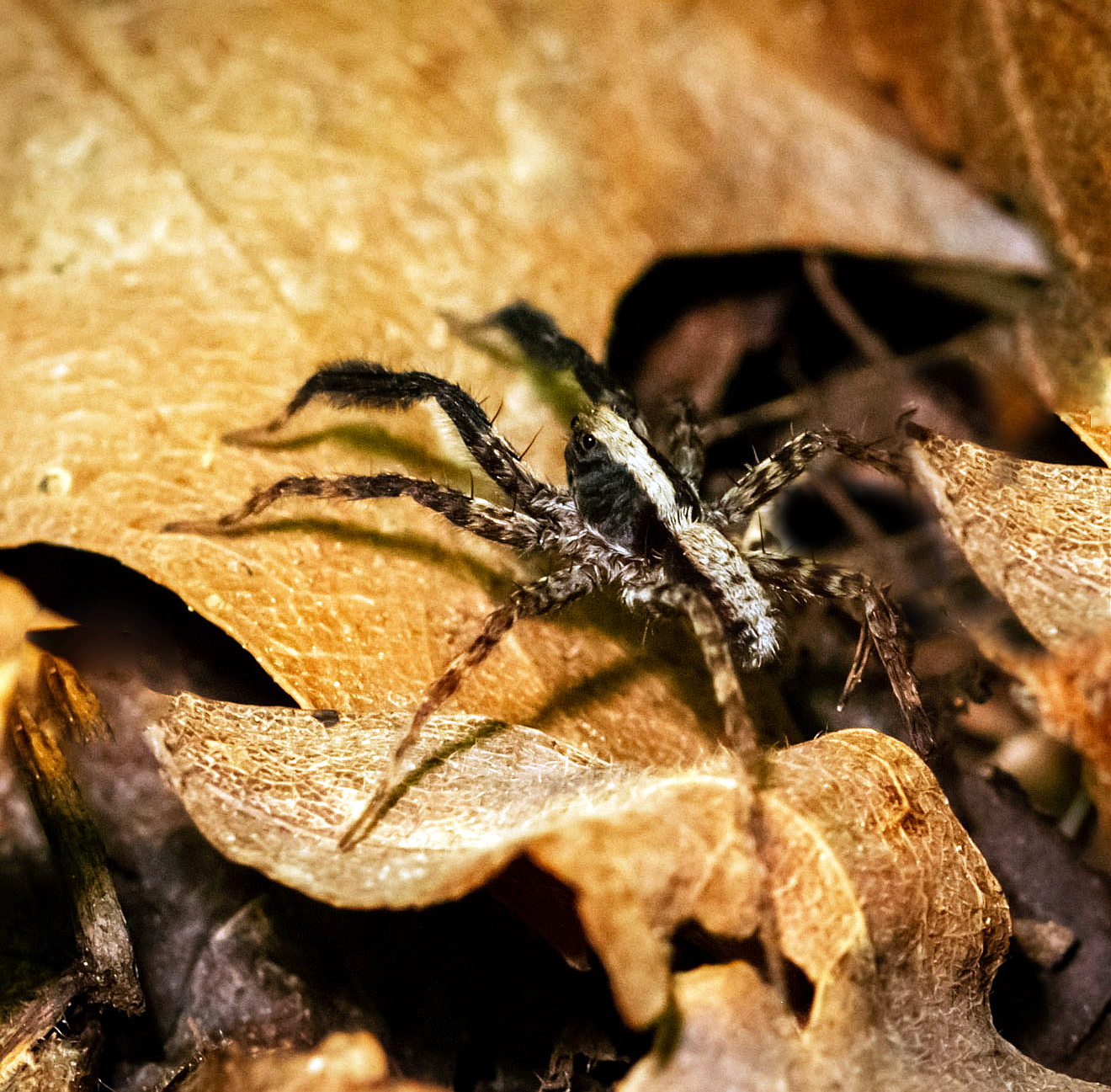
S. ocreata

As of October 2025, this genus includes 56 species:

- Schizocosa altamontis (Chamberlin, 1916) – Peru
- Schizocosa arua (Strand, 1911) – Indonesia (Aru Is.)
- Schizocosa astuta (Roewer, 1959) – Tanzania
- Schizocosa aulonia Dondale, 1969 – United States
- Schizocosa avida (Walckenaer, 1837) – Canada, United States, Mexico
- Schizocosa bilineata (Emerton, 1885) – Canada, United States
- Schizocosa cecili (Pocock, 1901) – Zimbabwe
- Schizocosa ceratiola (Gertsch & Wallace, 1935) – United States
- Schizocosa cespitum Dondale & Redner, 1978 – Canada
- Schizocosa chiricahua Dondale & Redner, 1978 – United States
- Schizocosa communis (Emerton, 1885) – Canada, United States
- Schizocosa concolor (Caporiacco, 1935) – Palistan (Karakorum)
- Schizocosa conspicua (Roewer, 1959) – Rwanda
- Schizocosa cotabatoana Barrion & Litsinger, 1995 – Philippines
- Schizocosa crassipalpata Roewer, 1951 – Canada, United States
- Schizocosa crassipes (Walckenaer, 1837) – United States
- Schizocosa darlingi (Pocock, 1898) – Namibia, Botswana, Zimbabwe, South Africa
- Schizocosa duplex Chamberlin, 1925 – Canada, United States
- Schizocosa ehni (Lessert, 1933) – Angola
- Schizocosa floridana Bryant, 1934 – United States
- Schizocosa fragilis (Thorell, 1890) – Indonesia (Sumatra)
- Schizocosa hebes (O. Pickard-Cambridge, 1885) – China (Yarkand), India?
- Schizocosa hewitti (Lessert, 1915) – DR Congo, Kenya, Tanzania
- Schizocosa humilis (Banks, 1892) – Canada, United States
- Schizocosa incerta (Bryant, 1934) – United States
- Schizocosa interjecta (Roewer, 1959) – Tanzania
- Schizocosa malitiosa (Tullgren, 1905) – Bolivia, Argentina, Uruguay
- Schizocosa maxima Dondale & Redner, 1978 – United States
- Schizocosa mccooki (Montgomery, 1904) – Canada, United States, Mexico
- Schizocosa mimula (Gertsch, 1934) – United States, Mexico
- Schizocosa minahassae (Merian, 1911) – Indonesia (Sulawesi)
- Schizocosa minnesotensis (Gertsch, 1934) – Canada, United States
- Schizocosa minor (Lessert, 1926) – East Africa
- Schizocosa obscoena (Rainbow, 1899) – Vanuatu
- Schizocosa ocreata (Hentz, 1844) – Canada, United States, Mexico (type species)
- Schizocosa parricida (Karsch, 1881) – China
- Schizocosa perplexa Bryant, 1936 – United States
- Schizocosa pilipes (Karsch, 1879) – West, Central Africa
- Schizocosa puebla Chamberlin, 1925 – United States
- Schizocosa retrorsa (Banks, 1911) – Canada, United States, Mexico
- Schizocosa rovneri Uetz & Dondale, 1979 – United States
- Schizocosa rubiginea (O. Pickard-Cambridge, 1885) – China (Yarkand), India?
- Schizocosa salara (Roewer, 1960) – Afghanistan
- Schizocosa salsa Barnes, 1953 – United States
- Schizocosa saltatrix (Hentz, 1844) – Canada, United States, Mexico
- Schizocosa segregata Gertsch & Wallace, 1937 – United States
- Schizocosa semiargentea (Simon, 1898) – Peru
- Schizocosa serranoi (Mello-Leitão, 1941) – Brazil, Argentina
- Schizocosa stridulans Stratton, 1984 – United States
- Schizocosa subpersonata (Simon, 1910) – Namibia, South Africa
- Schizocosa tamae (Gertsch & Davis, 1940) – Mexico
- Schizocosa tenera (Karsch, 1879) – West, Central Africa
- Schizocosa tristani (Banks, 1909) – Costa Rica, Panama
- Schizocosa uetzi Stratton, 1997 – United States
- Schizocosa venusta (Roewer, 1959) – Tanzania
- Schizocosa vulpecula (L. Koch, 1865) – Wallis Is.
