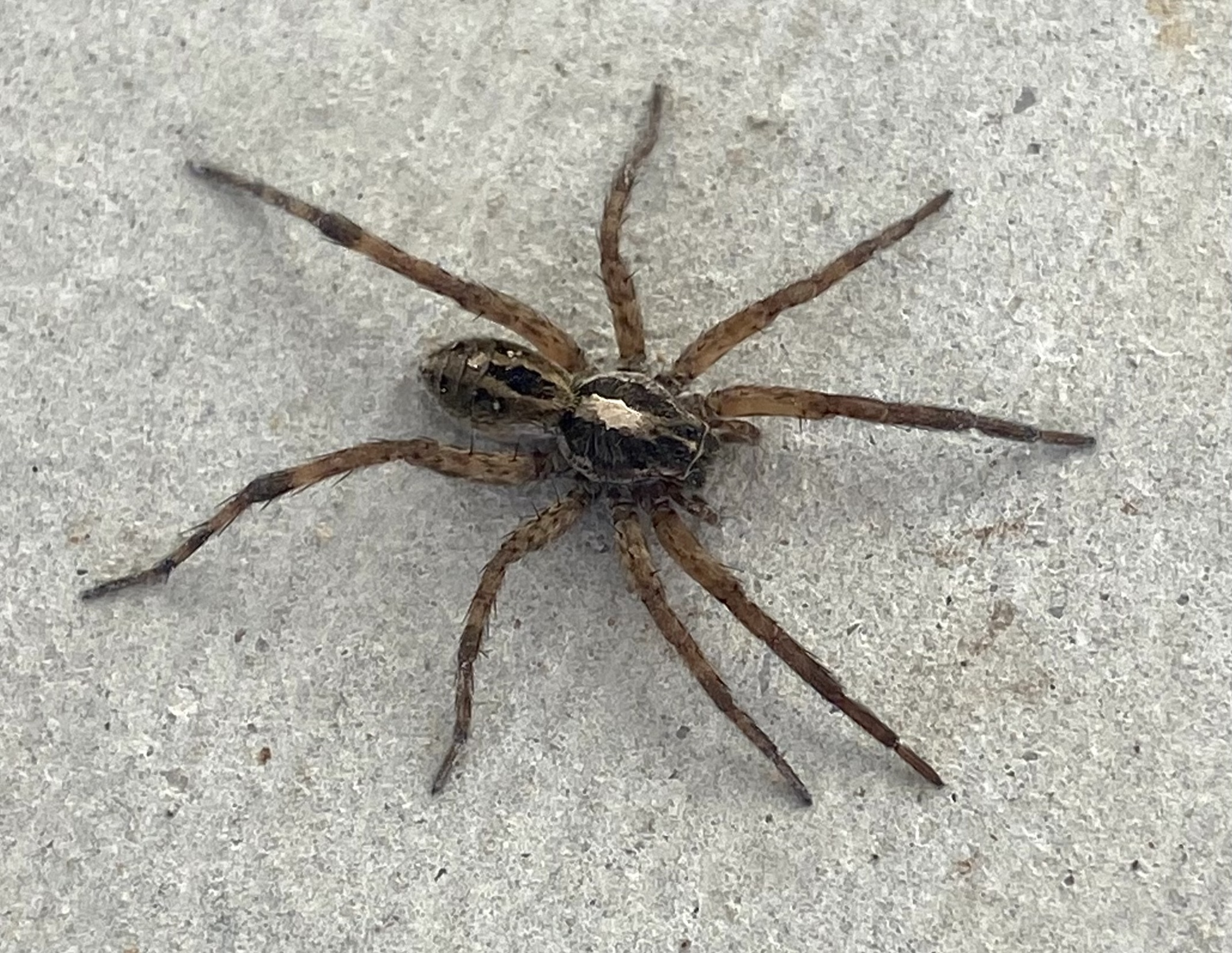

Scientific classification
- Kingdom: Animalia
- Phylum: Arthropoda
- Subphylum: Chelicerata
- Class: Arachnida
- Order: Araneae
- Infraorder: Araneomorphae
- Family: Lycosidae
- Genus: Schizocosa
- Species: S. avida

Binomial name
- Schizocosa avida (Walckenaer, 1837)

= Schizocosa avida =

Species of spider

Schizocosa avida is a species of wolf spider in the family Lycosidae. It is found in North America, throughout the United States and Canada.

== Description ==
The abdomen has a dark central area surrounded by a light colored margin. The female's length varies between 10–15 millimetres (0.39–0.59 in) and the male varies between 8–11 millimetres (0.31–0.43 in).

== Behavior ==
They are more active in the spring and summer, often found in open fields and prairies. They are capable of leg autotomy, intentionally severing a limb to avoid predation.
