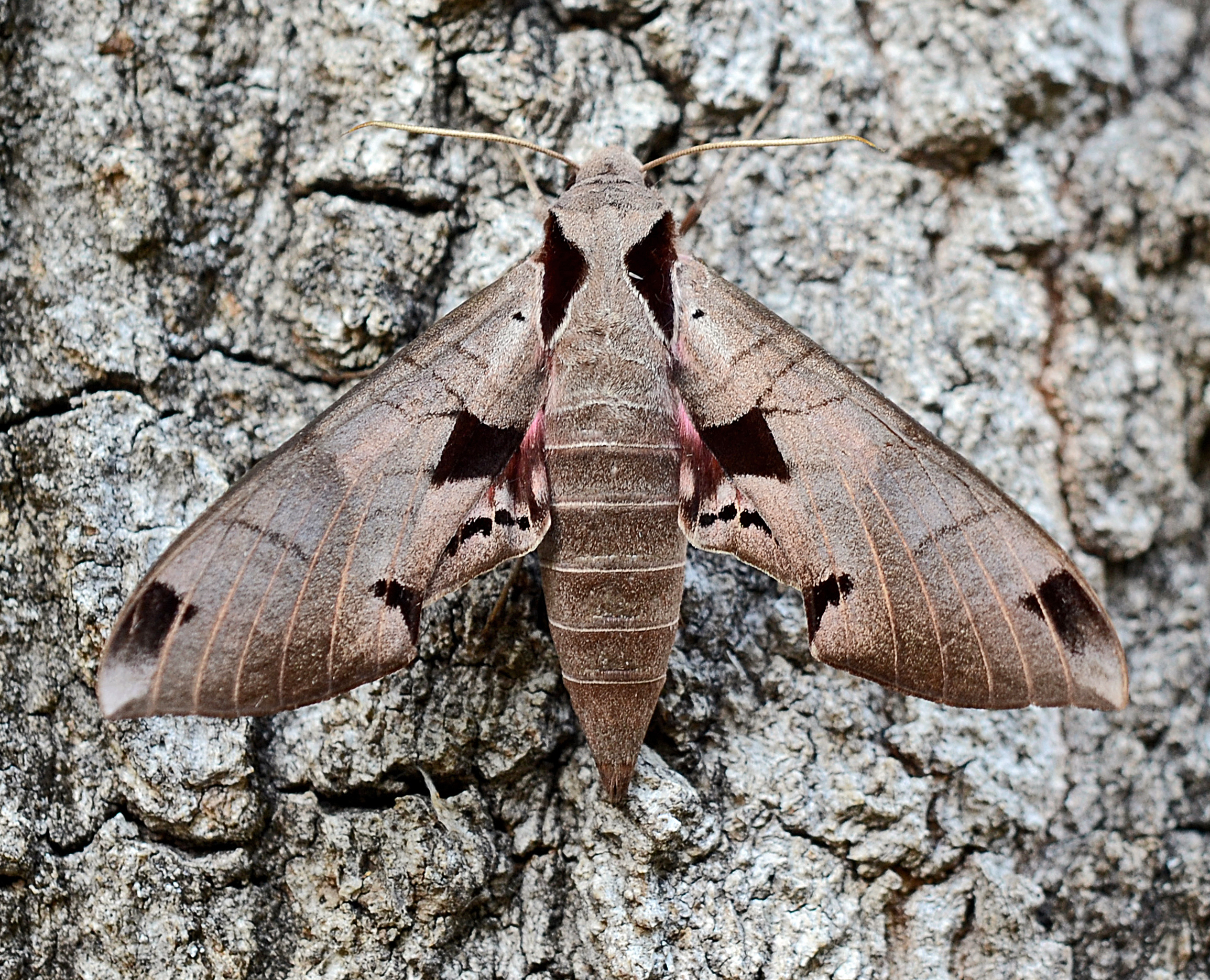

Conservation status
- Apparently Secure (NatureServe)

Scientific classification
- Kingdom: Animalia
- Phylum: Arthropoda
- Class: Insecta
- Order: Lepidoptera
- Family: Sphingidae
- Genus: Eumorpha
- Species: E. achemon

Binomial name
- Eumorpha achemon (Drury, 1773)

Synonyms
- Sphinx achemon Drury, 1773; Sphinx crantor Cramer, 1777; Pholus achemon trigon Gehlen, 1926

= Eumorpha achemon =

Achemon sphinx

Species of moth

Eumorpha achemon, the Achemon sphinx, is a moth of the family Sphingidae. The species was first described by Dru Drury in 1773.

== Distribution ==
It is native to North America, where it is known from most of the United States, southern Canada, and northern Mexico. It is rare or absent in the Pacific Northwest, Great Basin, and Southeastern United States except Florida.

== Description ==
The wingspan is 87–97 mm. It can be distinguished from all other Eumorpha species by the hindwing upperside being almost uniformly pale pink from the base to the diffuse, dark brown submarginal band.

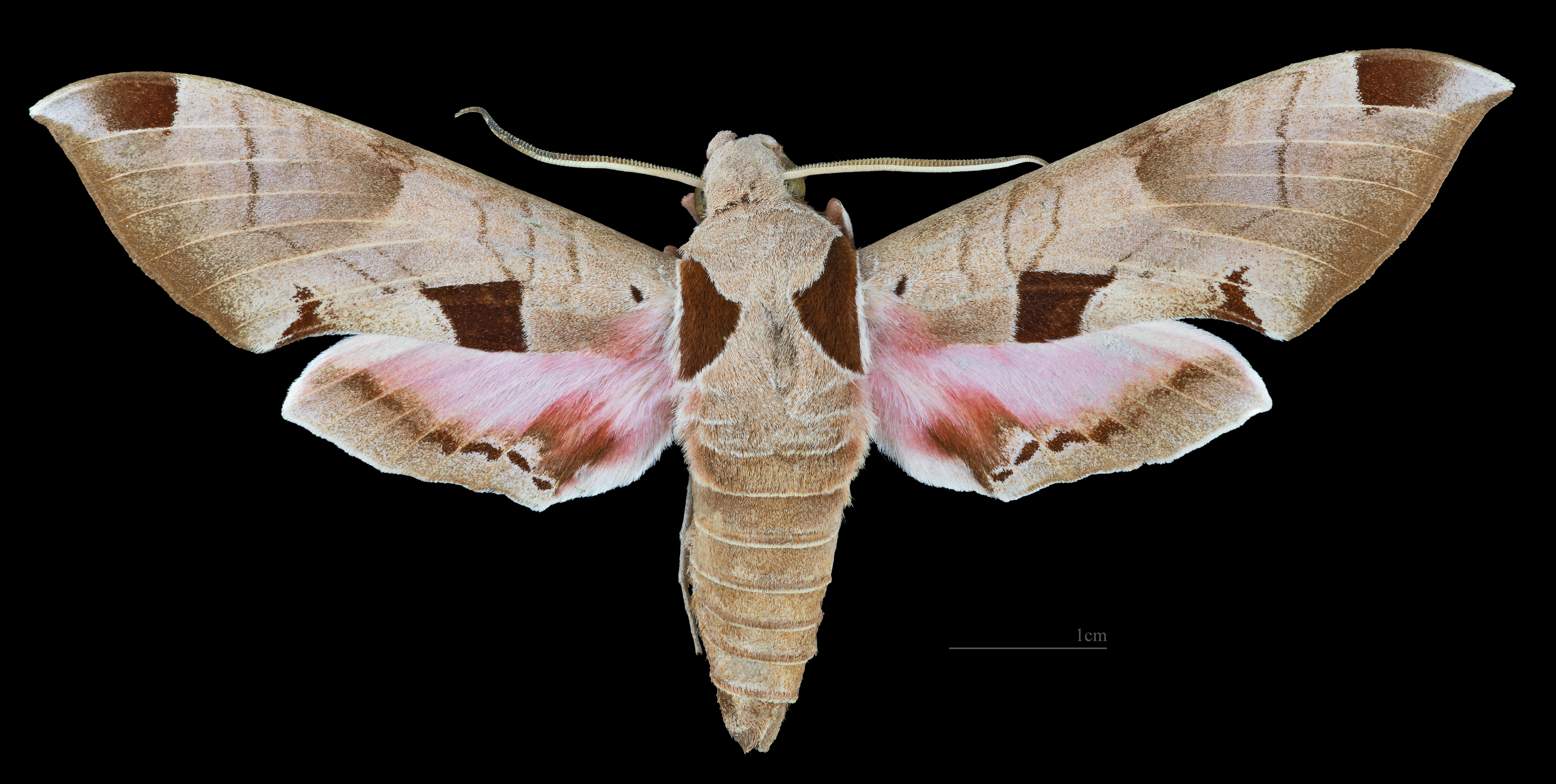
Eumorpha achemon ♂

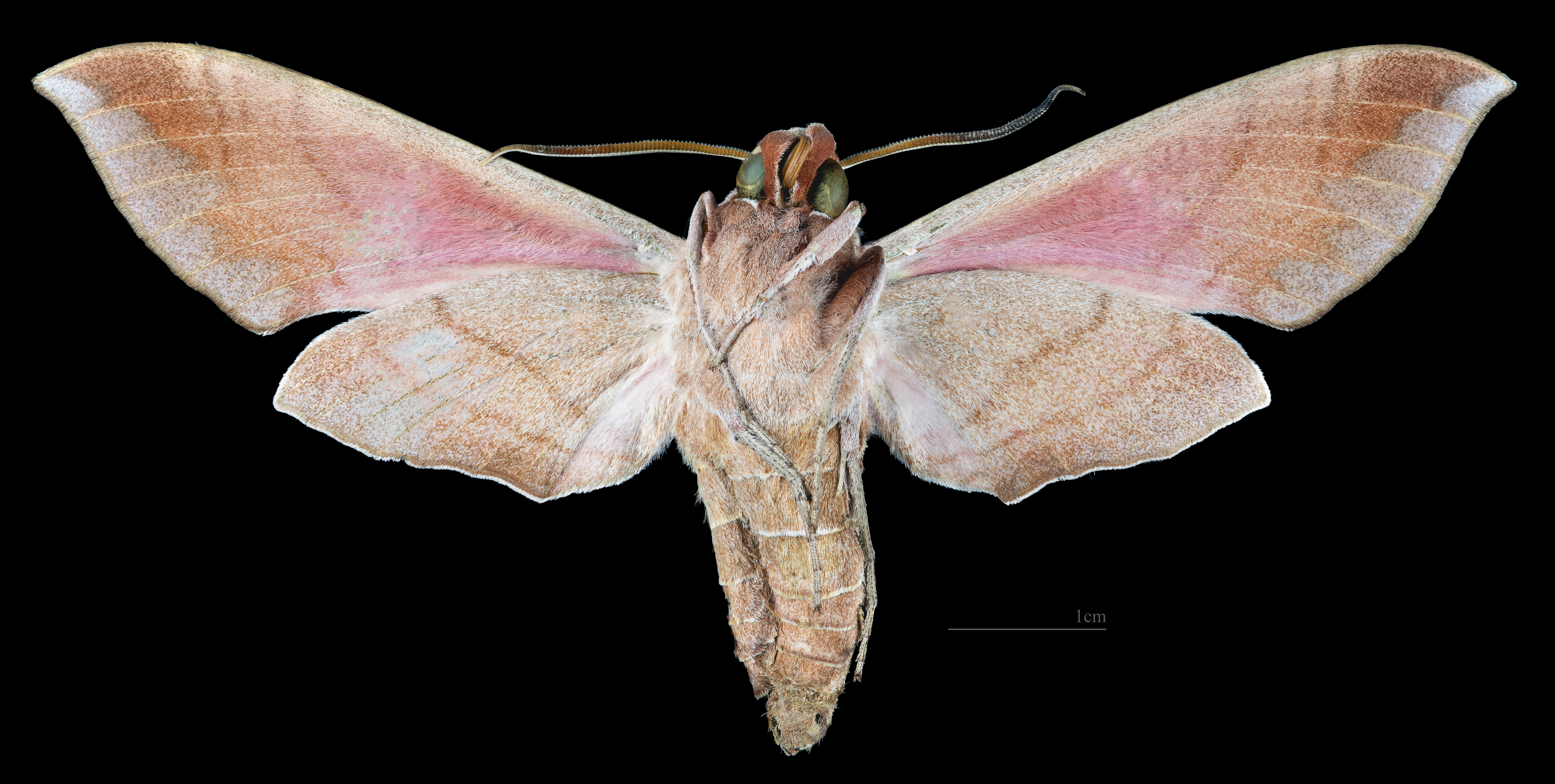
Eumorpha achemon ♂ △

Larvae are of three forms: light green, reddish orange, and tan to brown.

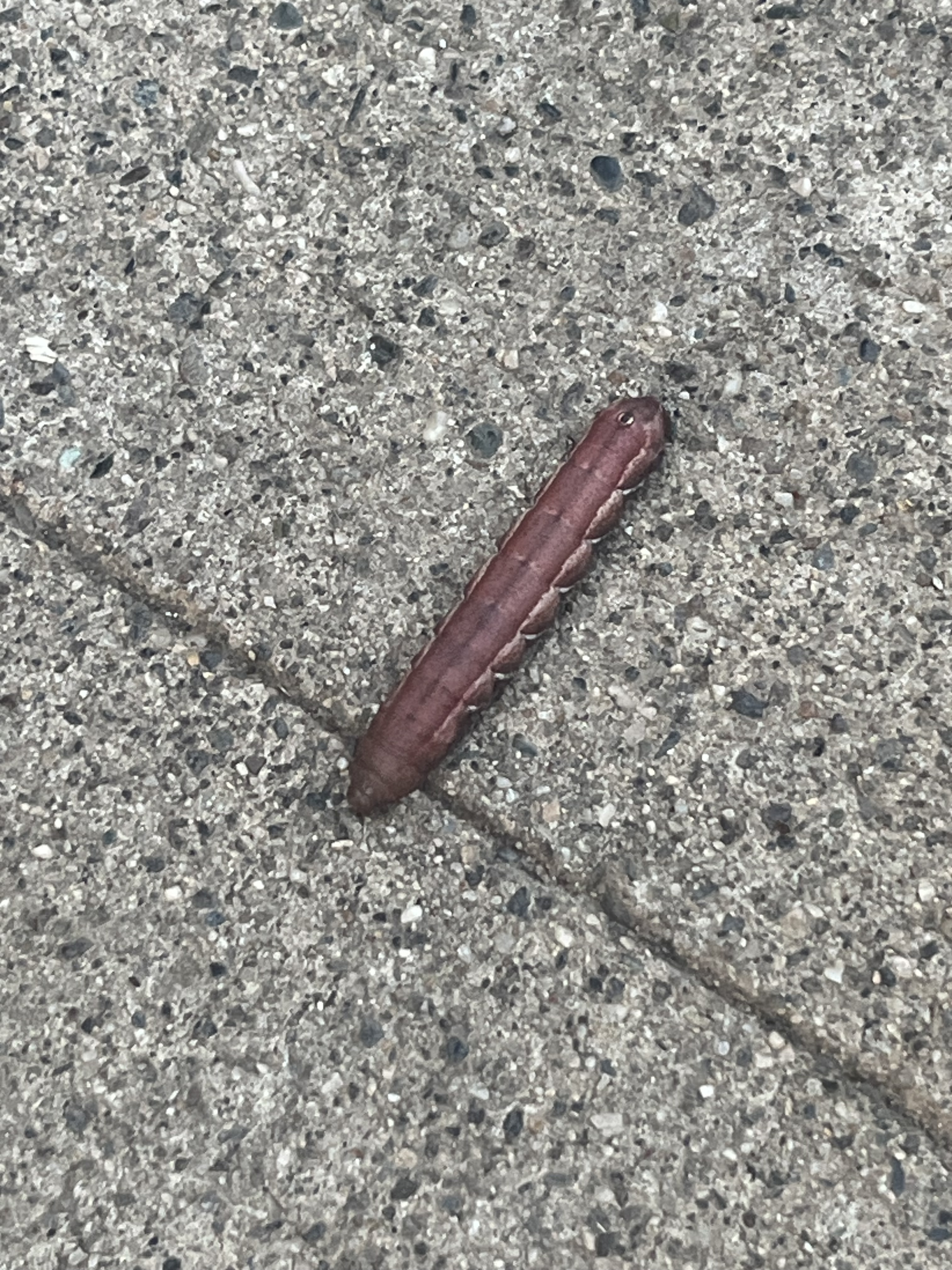
A Eumorpha achemon caterpillar walking across a concrete sidewalk

== Biology ==
Adults are on wing from June to August in one generation in the northern part of the range. There are two generations with adults on wing from May to August in the south. Adults feed on the nectar of various flowers, including Lonicera japonica, Petunia × atkinsiana, Philadelphus coronarius, and Phlox species. It is one of five main pollinators of the rare orchid Platanthera praeclara.

They are known to feed on Parthenocissus quinquefolia and Ampelopsis species. They are often found on wild and cultivated Vitaceae, including grapes, and they can sometimes be found in vineyards feeding on the leaves.
