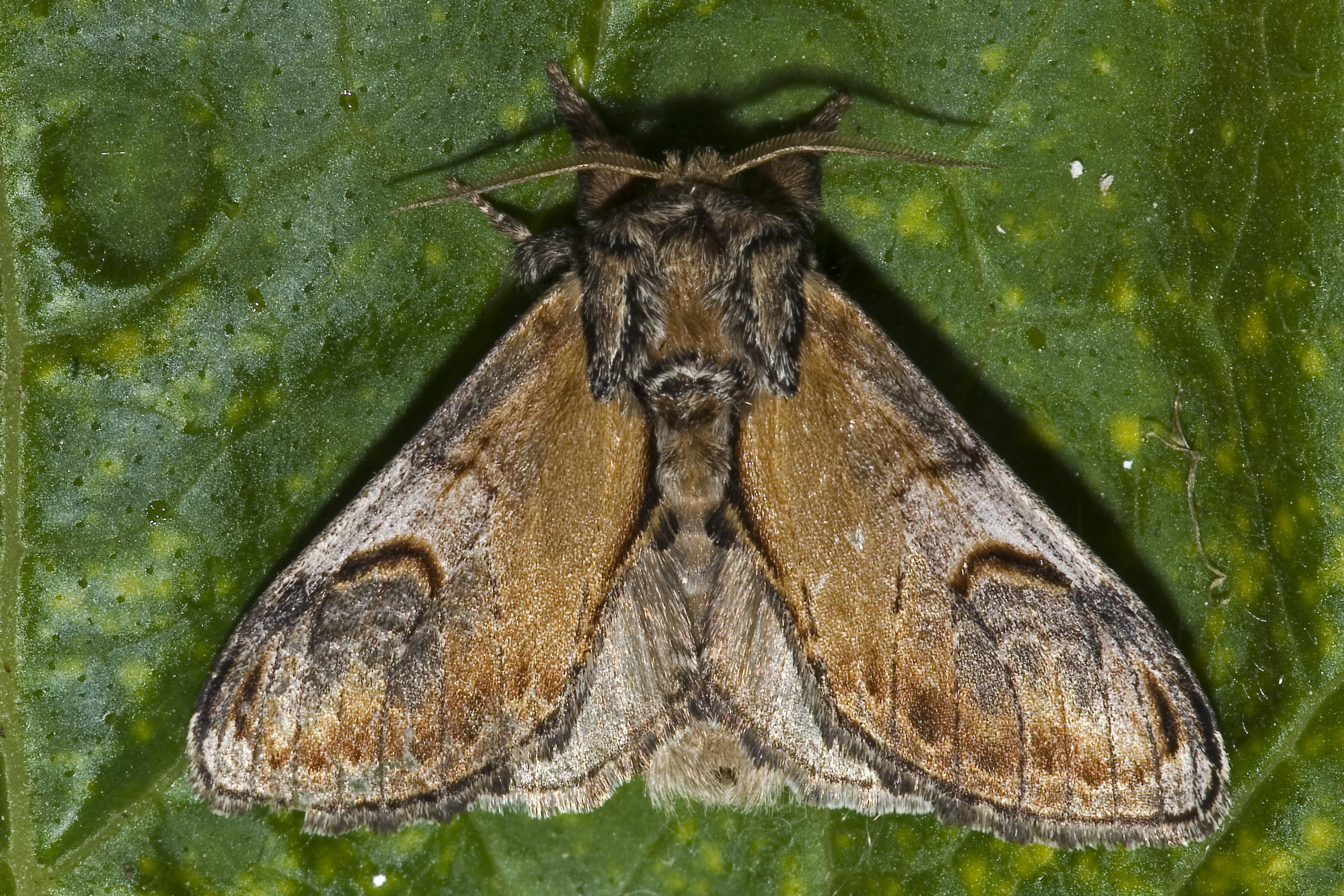

Scientific classification
- Kingdom: Animalia
- Phylum: Arthropoda
- Clade: Pancrustacea
- Class: Insecta
- Order: Lepidoptera
- Superfamily: Noctuoidea
- Family: Notodontidae
- Genus: Notodonta
- Species: N. ziczac

Binomial name
- Notodonta ziczac (Linnaeus, 1758)

Synonyms
- Eligmodonta ziczac (Linnaeus)

= Notodonta ziczac =

Pebble prominent

Species of moth

Notodonta ziczac, the pebble prominent, is a moth of the family Notodontidae. It is found in Europe ranging to Central Asia.

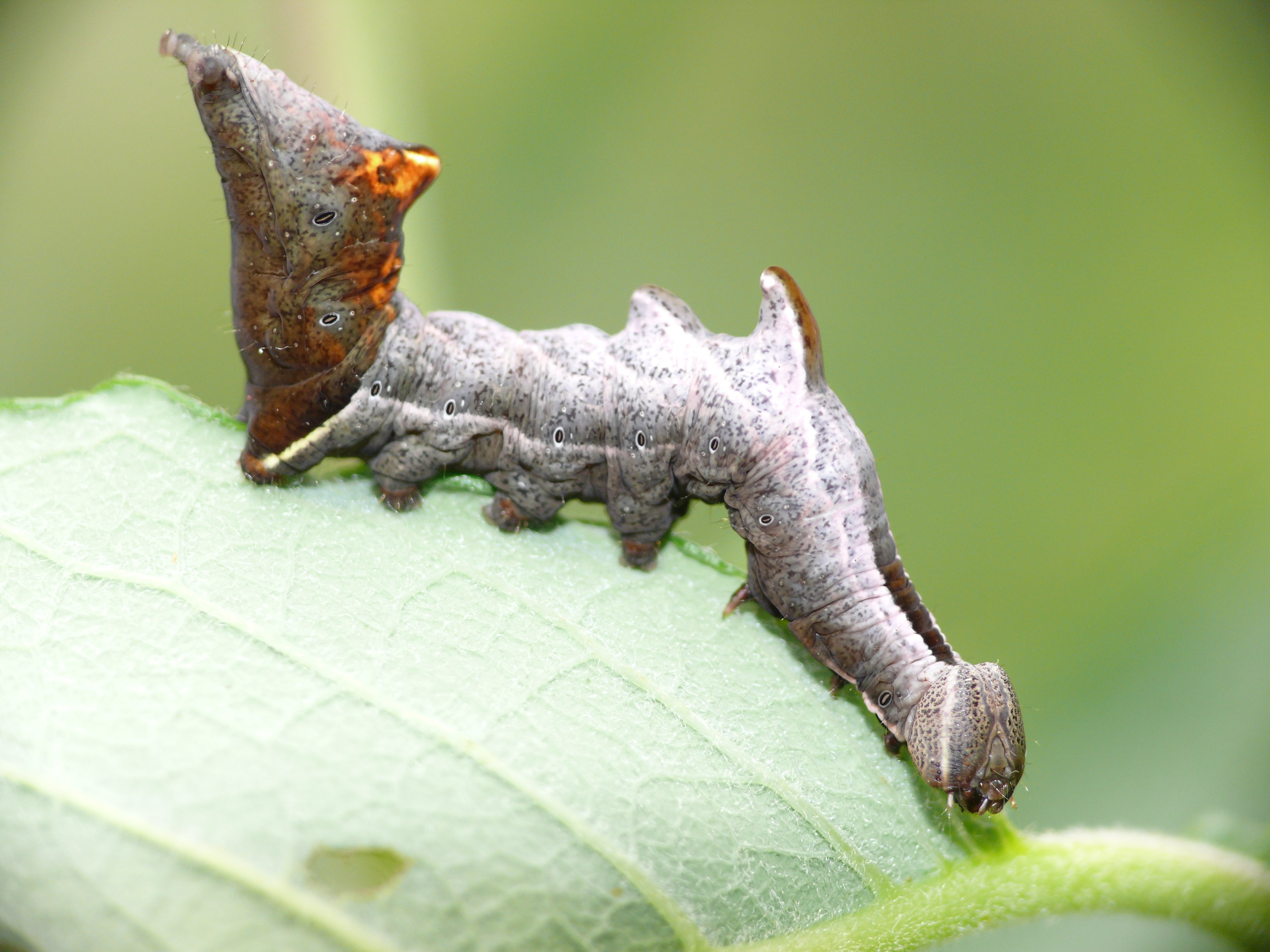
larva

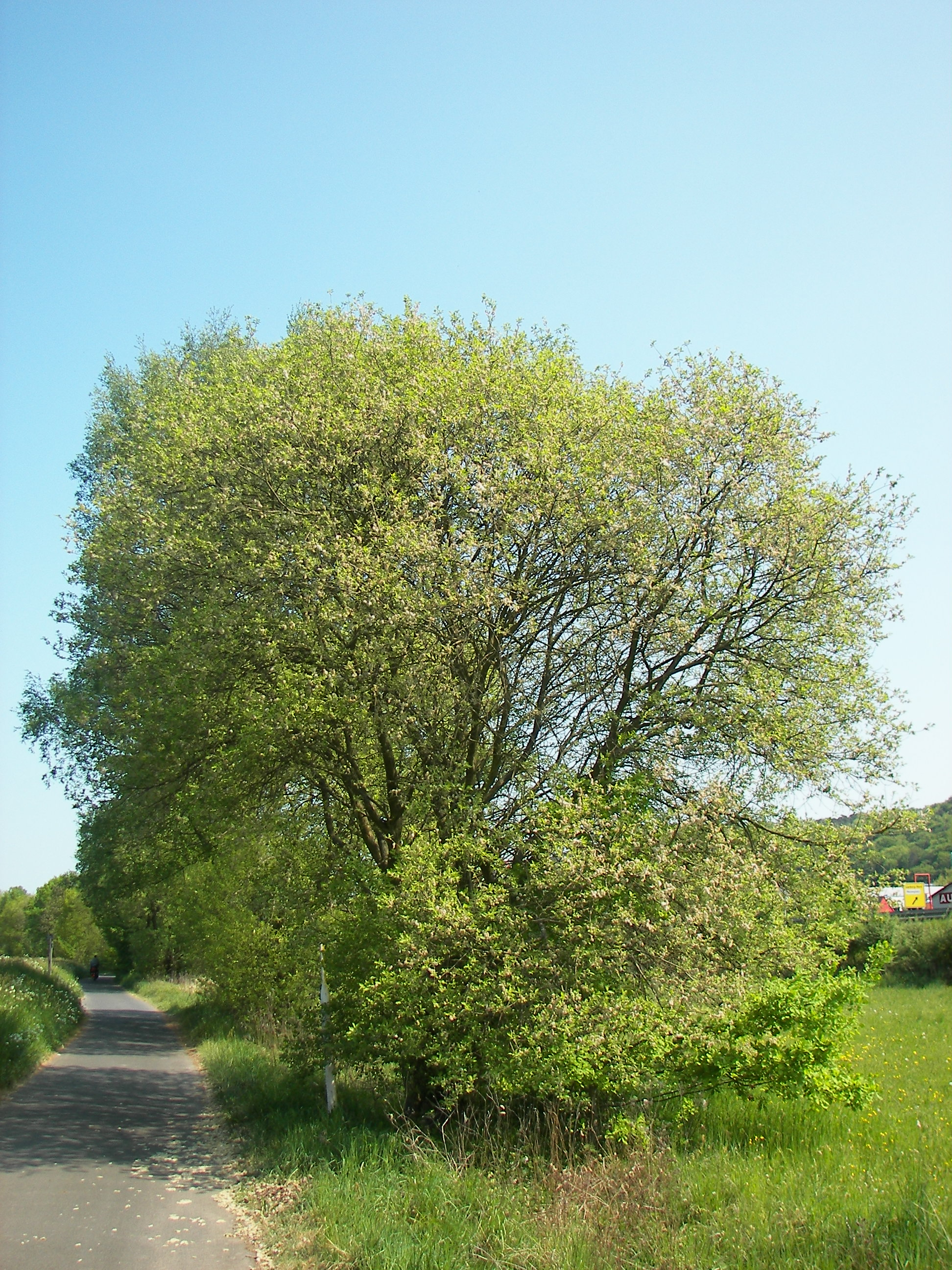
habitat

== Description ==
The wingspan is 40–45 mm. Their forewings are light grey on the front edge, the inner portion of the wing is cinnamon-brown. In the grey area is a roundish dark grey stain shaped like a pebble bounded proximally by a dark curved line. There is a dark, curved postmedian line towards the apex of the wing. The hindwings are grey, darker grey in the females. They have a dark, discal lunule. The thorax and abdomen are dark brown and thickly clothed with hair. Seitz- Basal half of forewing light yellowish brown, the central costal area white-grey in between at dark transverse line and the large arcuate black discal spot, beyond the discal spot a broad dark cloud distally bounded by a pale dentate line; in the marginal area a slightly undulate dark submarginal line (distally pale-edged and curving basad below costal margin in the shape of a black longitudinal stripe; marginal line and hind margin black. Hindwing paler or darker greyish brown. The black markings of the forewing sometimes dark brown, but never paler. Central and Northern Europe, southward to Spain, Corsica, Central Italy, northern parts of Asia Minor. Accordmg to Graeser also in Amurland. — A pale form with the ground colour of the forewing ochreous instead of brown has been obtained in Central Asia: pallida subsp. nov. (45 g). —Egg green. Larva pale red to violet, with a strong tubercle on abdominal segments 2 and 3 and a dark dorsal line commencing at the head as in N. dromedaria; both the tubercle and the dorsal stripe are edged with white; dark specimens moreover, have white spots and oblique stripes on the back, as well as a white sideline on a level with the spiracles, the line being especially distinct on the thorax; head narrow and high, rather deeply incised at the vertex. June—-July and August—October, on Populus and Salix. Pupa dark brown, with two anal points, in a hard cocoon in or on the ground. Moth in 2 broods, April—May and July—August. In the North only one brood.

== Similar species ==
- Notodonta torva

== Biology ==
The moth flies from April to September depending on the location.

The larvae feed on poplar, primarily aspen (Populus tremula) and willow.
