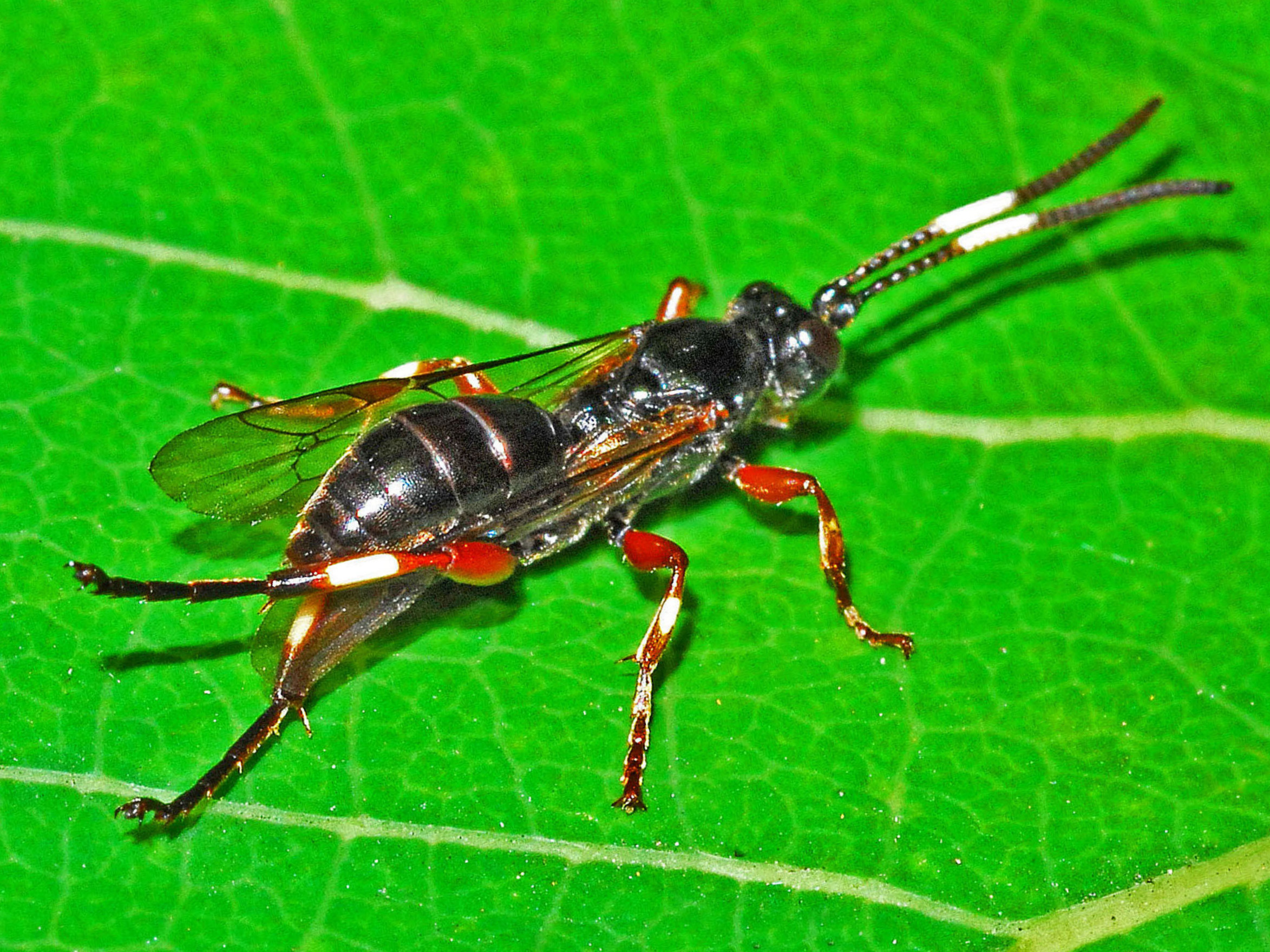
- Adult

Scientific classification
- Kingdom: Animalia
- Phylum: Arthropoda
- Clade: Pancrustacea
- Class: Insecta
- Order: Hymenoptera
- Family: Ichneumonidae
- Genus: Cratichneumon
- Species: C. culex

Binomial name
- Cratichneumon culex (Müller, 1776)

Synonyms
- List: Cratichneumon fabricator (Fabricius, 1793); Cratichneumon annulator (Fabricius, 1793); Cratichneumon clavipes (Gmelin, 1790); Cratichneumon crassator (Thunberg, 1822); Cratichneumon curvinervis (Holmgren, 1856); Cratichneumon fabricator (Fabricius, 1793); Cratichneumon fulvipes (Stephens, 1835); Cratichneumon infestor (Thunberg, 1822); Cratichneumon intermedius Constantineanu, Andriescu & Ciochia, 1956; Cratichneumon leucostoma (Gmelin, 1790); Cratichneumon nigroclypeatus Constantineanu, Andriescu & Ciochia, 1956; Cratichneumon quadricolor (Gmelin, 1790); Cratichneumon ruficoxis Constantineanu, Andriescu & Ciochia, 1956; Cratichneumon tibialis (Geoffroy, 1785); Cratichneumon versicolor (Gmelin, 1790); Cratichneumon viator (Thunberg, 1822); Ichneumon annulator Fabricius, 1793; Ichneumon culex Muller, 1776

= Cratichneumon culex =

Species of wasp

Cratichneumon culex is a species of the parasitic wasp of the family Ichneumonidae. The species was first described by Müller in 1776.

== Description ==
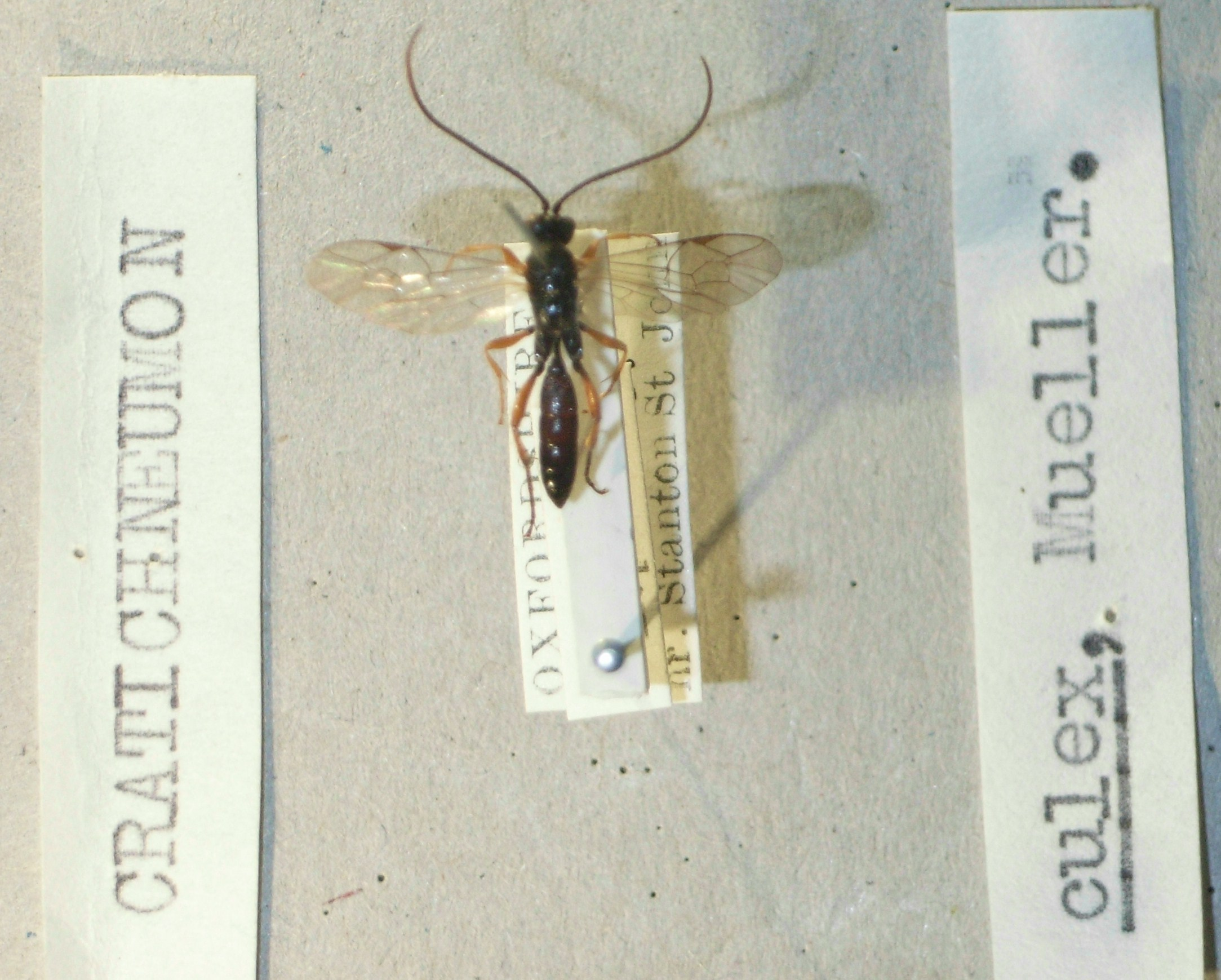
Museum specimen

Cratichneumon culex can reach a length of 15–16 mm (0.59–0.63 in) (excluding antennae). As usual in Incheumonidae these solitary parasitic wasps have an elongated abdomen and very long antennae. The body is black, while the legs are reddish or reddish with white markings and the antennae are partially white.

== Distribution and habitat ==
This species can be found in most of Europe. It lives in hedge rows.

== Biology ==
This species is a pupal parasitoid. Adults parasite the pupae of the winter moth Operophtera brumata. Other recorded hosts are Semiothisa species and Bupalus piniarius (Geometridae), Tethea or (Drepanidae), Notodonta dromedarius (Notodontidae), Dasychira pudibunda (Lymantridae) and Panolis flammea (Noctuidae). These wasps are mainly active in the late summer. They search for their prey in the soil. The females lay eggs into pupae with the ovipositor.
