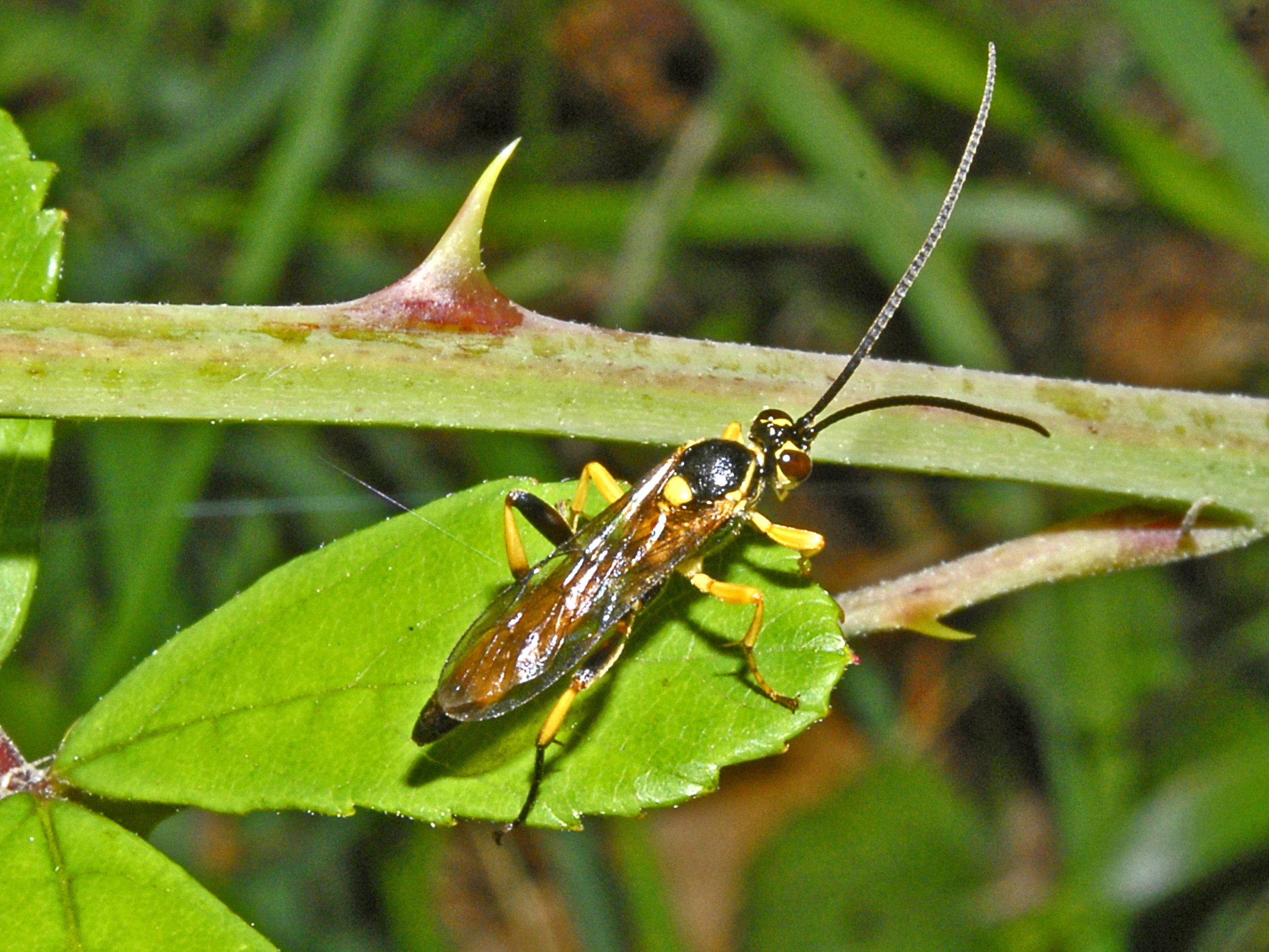
- Cratichneumon coruscator
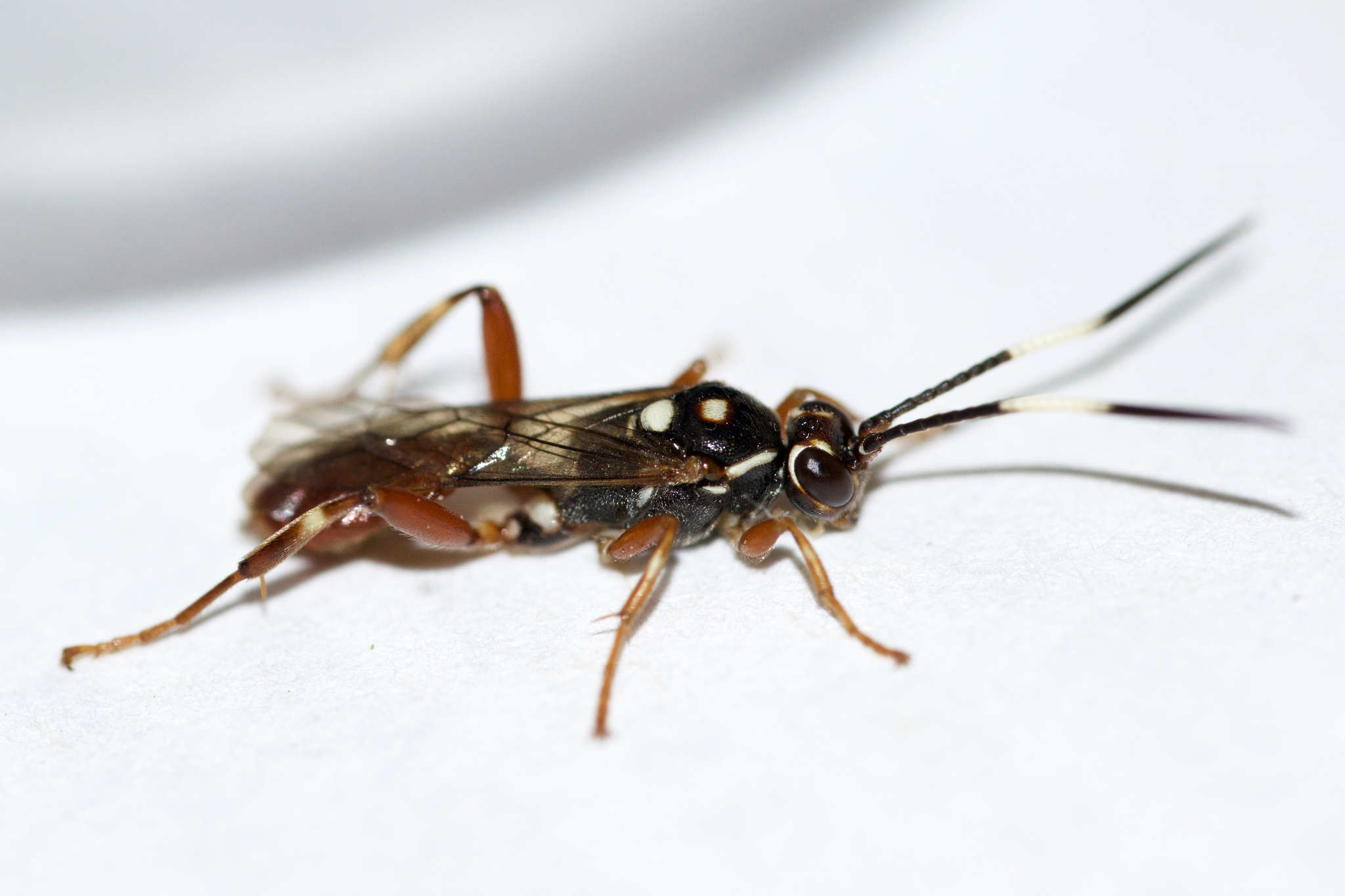
- Cratichneumon subfilatus

Scientific classification
- Kingdom: Animalia
- Phylum: Arthropoda
- Class: Insecta
- Order: Hymenoptera
- Family: Ichneumonidae
- Tribe: Ichneumonini
- Genus: Cratichneumon; Thomson, 1893

= Cratichneumon =

Genus of wasps

Cratichneumon is a genus of the parasitic wasp that belongs to the family Ichneumonidae. It is native to North America but mostly in the eastern United States and Canada.

It is one of the most common and diverse genus of ichneumonine genera in the nearctic realm. They have a considerable range of size to the point where larger species may be confused with Ichneumon and smaller species may be confused with Barichneumon, Melanichneumon, Homotherus, Aoplus, and Crypteffigies.

== Species ==
This genus is diverse including more than 100 species and may be paraphyletic . However there are likely many undescribed species as seen with Claridge et al. (2024) which describes 11 new species within this genus.

Species within this genus include:

- Cratichneumon ablutus
- Cratichneumon acronictae
- Cratichneumon albifrons
- Cratichneumon albiscuta
- Cratichneumon alternans
- Cratichneumon amamioshimensis
- Cratichneumon amecus
- Cratichneumon amoenus
- Cratichneumon anisotae
- Cratichneumon annulatipes
- Cratichneumon annulatus
- Cratichneumon anotylus
- Cratichneumon argemus
- Cratichneumon arizonensis
- Cratichneumon armillatops
- Cratichneumon ashmeadi
- Cratichneumon aspratilis
- Cratichneumon astutus
- Cratichneumon austropiceipes
- Cratichneumon bifasciatus
- Cratichneumon boreoalpinus
- Cratichneumon boreovagans
- Cratichneumon brevipennis
- Cratichneumon broweri
- Cratichneumon carolinae
- Cratichneumon causticus
- Cratichneumon chishimanus
- Cratichneumon citrinus
- Cratichneumon coruscator
- Cratichneumon culex
- Cratichneumon davisi
- Cratichneumon declinans
- Cratichneumon demissus
- Cratichneumon dissimilis
- Cratichneumon doliturus
- Cratichneumon duplicatus
- Cratichneumon erythroscuta
- Cratichneumon excors
- Cratichneumon fabricator
- Cratichneumon facetus
- Cratichneumon ferrugops
- Cratichneumon flaschkai
- Cratichneumon flavifrons
- Cratichneumon flavipectus
- Cratichneumon flavomaculatus
- Cratichneumon floridensis
- Cratichneumon fugitivus
- Cratichneumon georgius
- Cratichneumon hongawaensis
- Cratichneumon horani
- Cratichneumon howdeni
- Cratichneumon infidus
- Cratichneumon insignitus
- Cratichneumon insolitus
- Cratichneumon insulae
- Cratichneumon interfector
- Cratichneumon involutus
- Cratichneumon japonicus
- Cratichneumon jocularis
- Cratichneumon jozanensis
- Cratichneumon kochiensis
- Cratichneumon labiatus
- Cratichneumon laevidorsis
- Cratichneumon lancea
- Cratichneumon leptocerus
- Cratichneumon lesnei
- Cratichneumon levis
- Cratichneumon louisianae
- Cratichneumon luteiventris
- Cratichneumon melanosomus
- Cratichneumon merucapitis
- Cratichneumon naumanni
- Cratichneumon nikkoensis
- Cratichneumon okamotoi
- Cratichneumon orientalis
- Cratichneumon pallitarsis
- Cratichneumon papilionariae
- Cratichneumon paraparatus
- Cratichneumon paratus
- Cratichneumon parvulus
- Cratichneumon pectoralis
- Cratichneumon pertenuis
- Cratichneumon petulcus
- Cratichneumon piceipes
- Cratichneumon pigeoti
- Cratichneumon pilosulus
- Cratichneumon popofensis
- Cratichneumon pratincola
- Cratichneumon promptus
- Cratichneumon proximus
- Cratichneumon pseudanisotae
- Cratichneumon pteridis
- Cratichneumon pulcherrimus
- Cratichneumon puncticoxa
- Cratichneumon pygmaeus
- Cratichneumon remanens
- Cratichneumon ritus
- Cratichneumon rubricoides
- Cratichneumon rubricops
- Cratichneumon rubricus
- Cratichneumon rufifrons
- Cratichneumon rufomaculatus
- Cratichneumon russatus
- Cratichneumon sahlbergi
- Cratichneumon sanguineoplagiatus
- Cratichneumon scitulus
- Cratichneumon semirufus
- Cratichneumon sexarmillatus
- Cratichneumon sicarius
- Cratichneumon signatipes
- Cratichneumon spilomerus
- Cratichneumon stenocarus
- Cratichneumon suadus
- Cratichneumon subfilatus
- Cratichneumon sublatus
- Cratichneumon takomae
- Cratichneumon tibialis
- Cratichneumon tyloidifer
- Cratichneumon unifasciatorius
- Cratichneumon unificatus
- Cratichneumon vaccinii
- Cratichneumon w-album
- Cratichneumon variegatus
- Cratichneumon veraepacis
- Cratichneumon versator
- Cratichneumon vescus
- Cratichneumon viator
- Cratichneumon vinnulus
- Cratichneumon vockerothi
- Cratichneumon vulpecula
- Cratichneumon yakutatensis

== Gallery ==
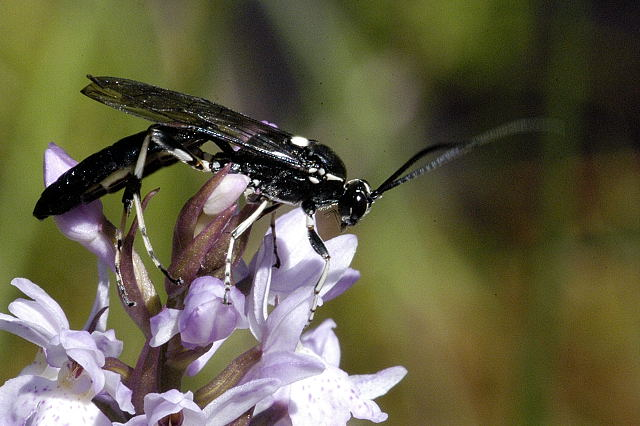
Cratichneumon sicarius

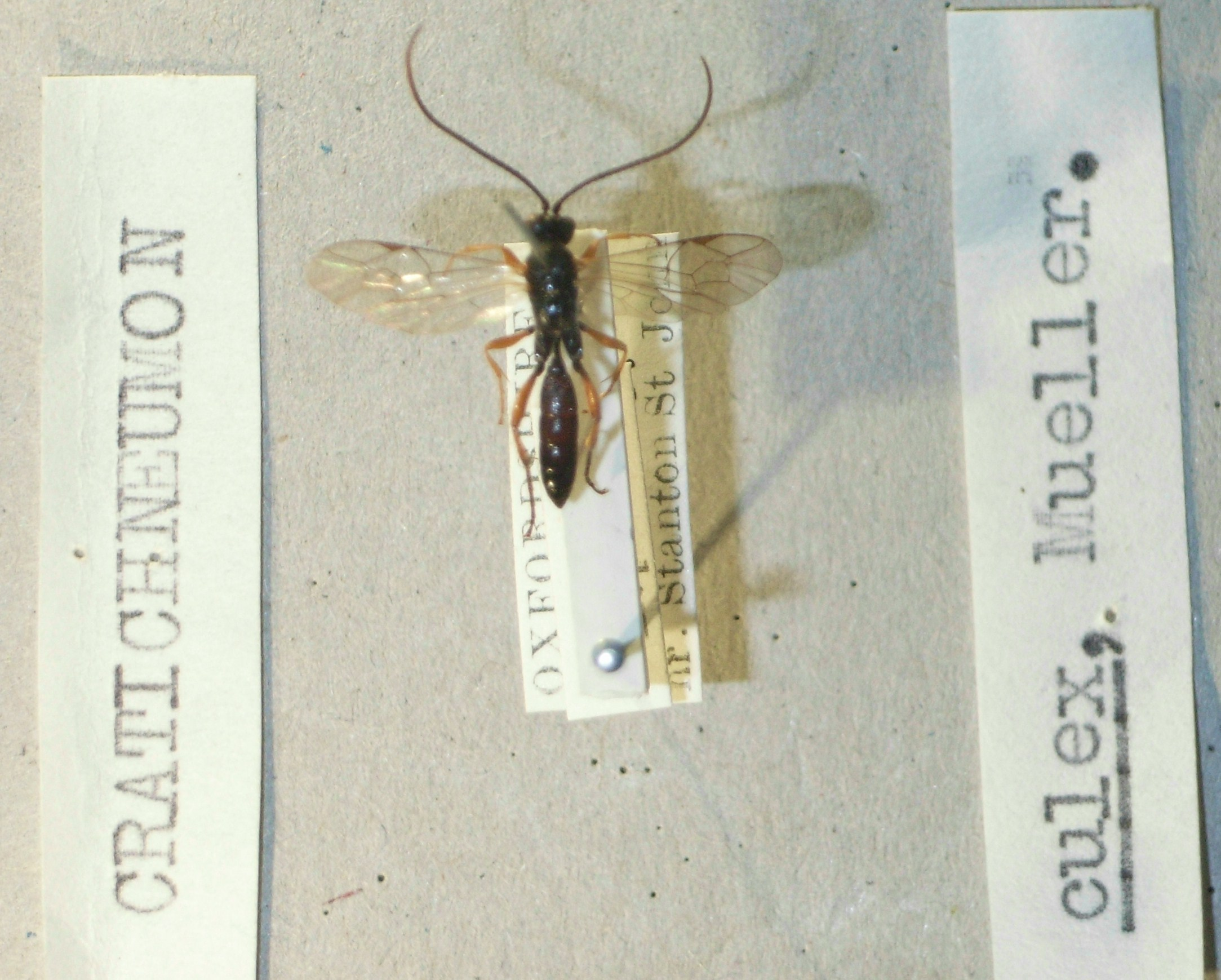
Cratichneumon culex

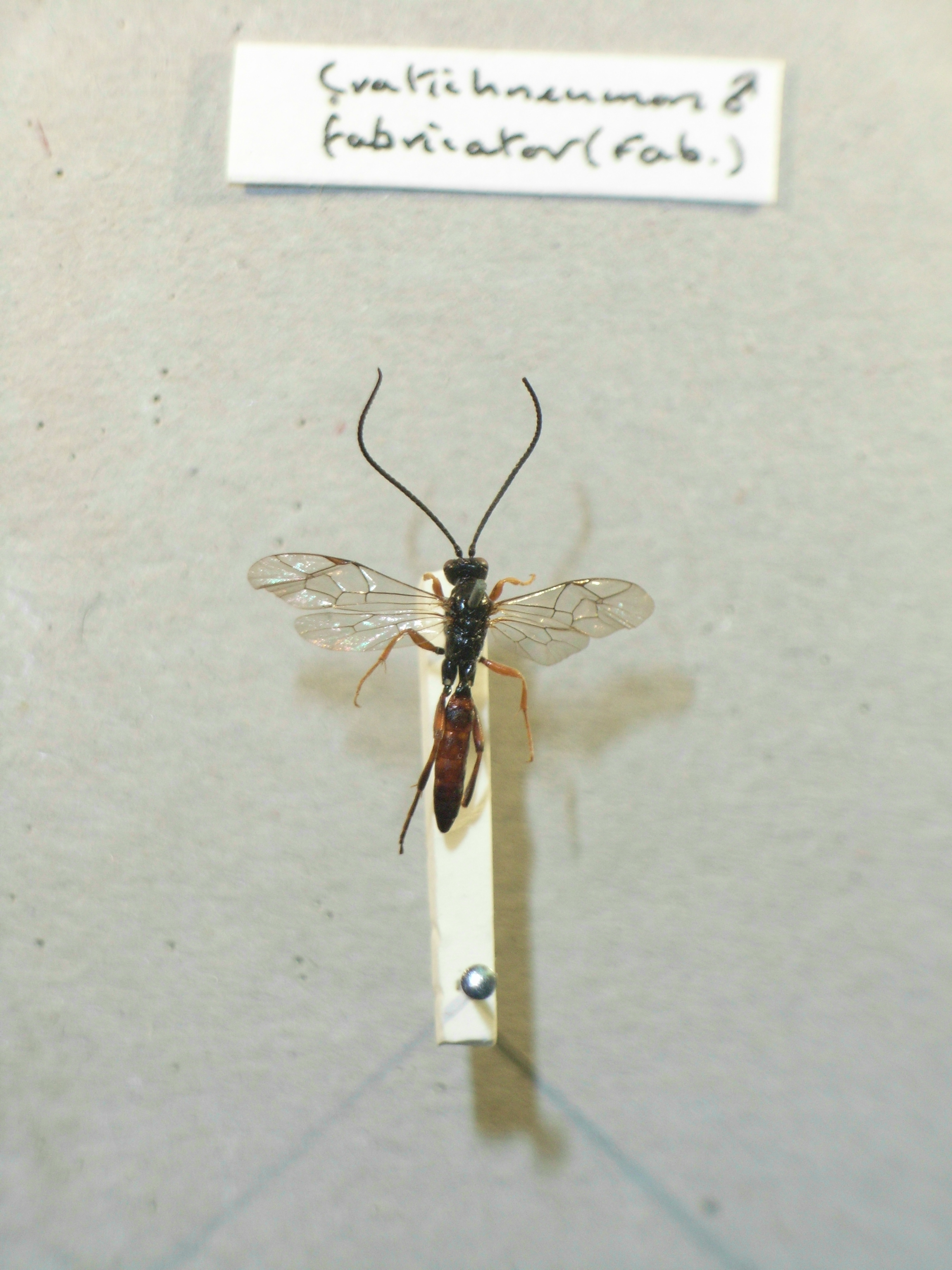
Cratichneumon fabricator

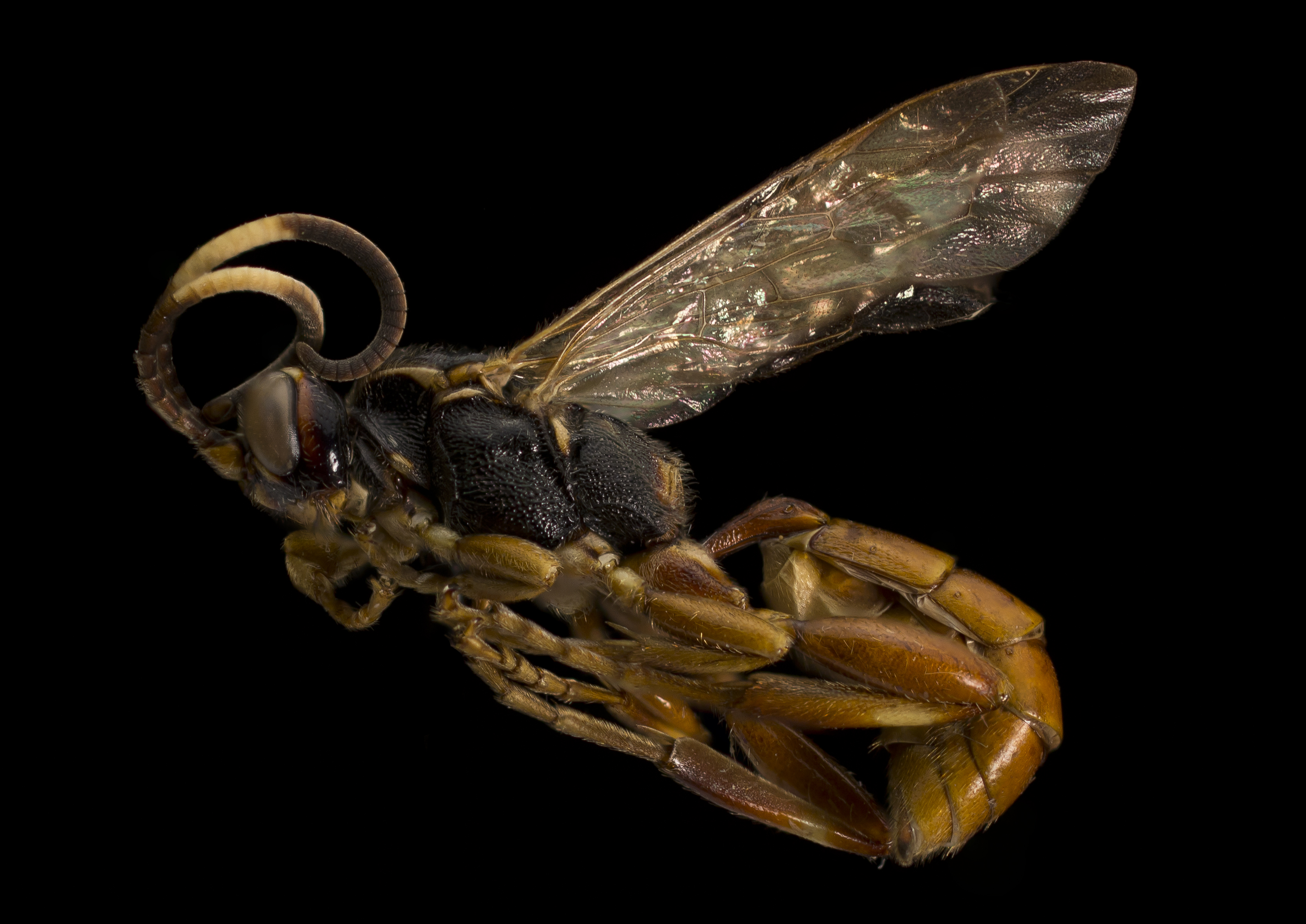
Cratichneumon sp.

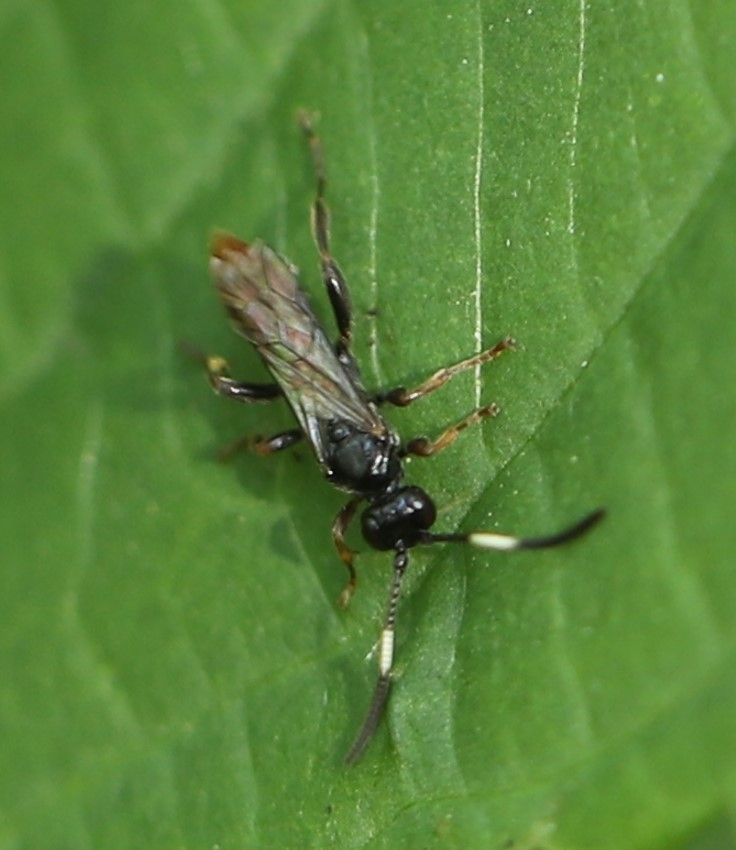
Cratichneumon coruscator

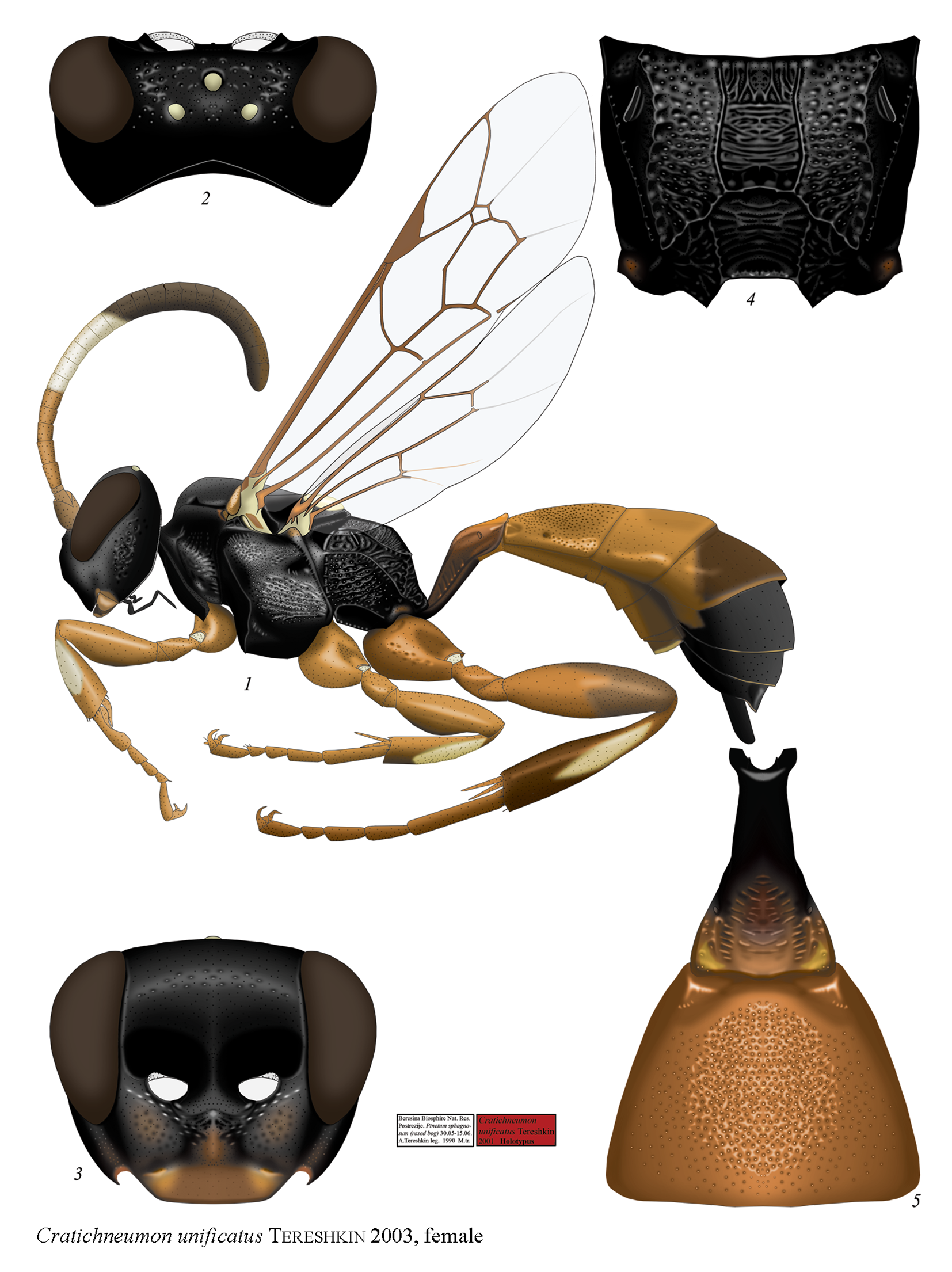
Cratichneumon unificatus

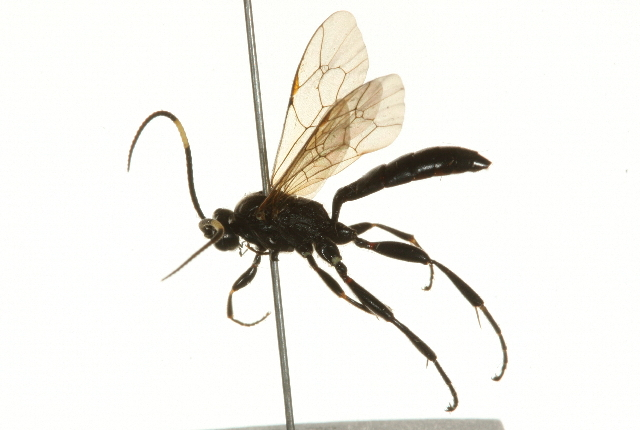
Cratichneumon viator

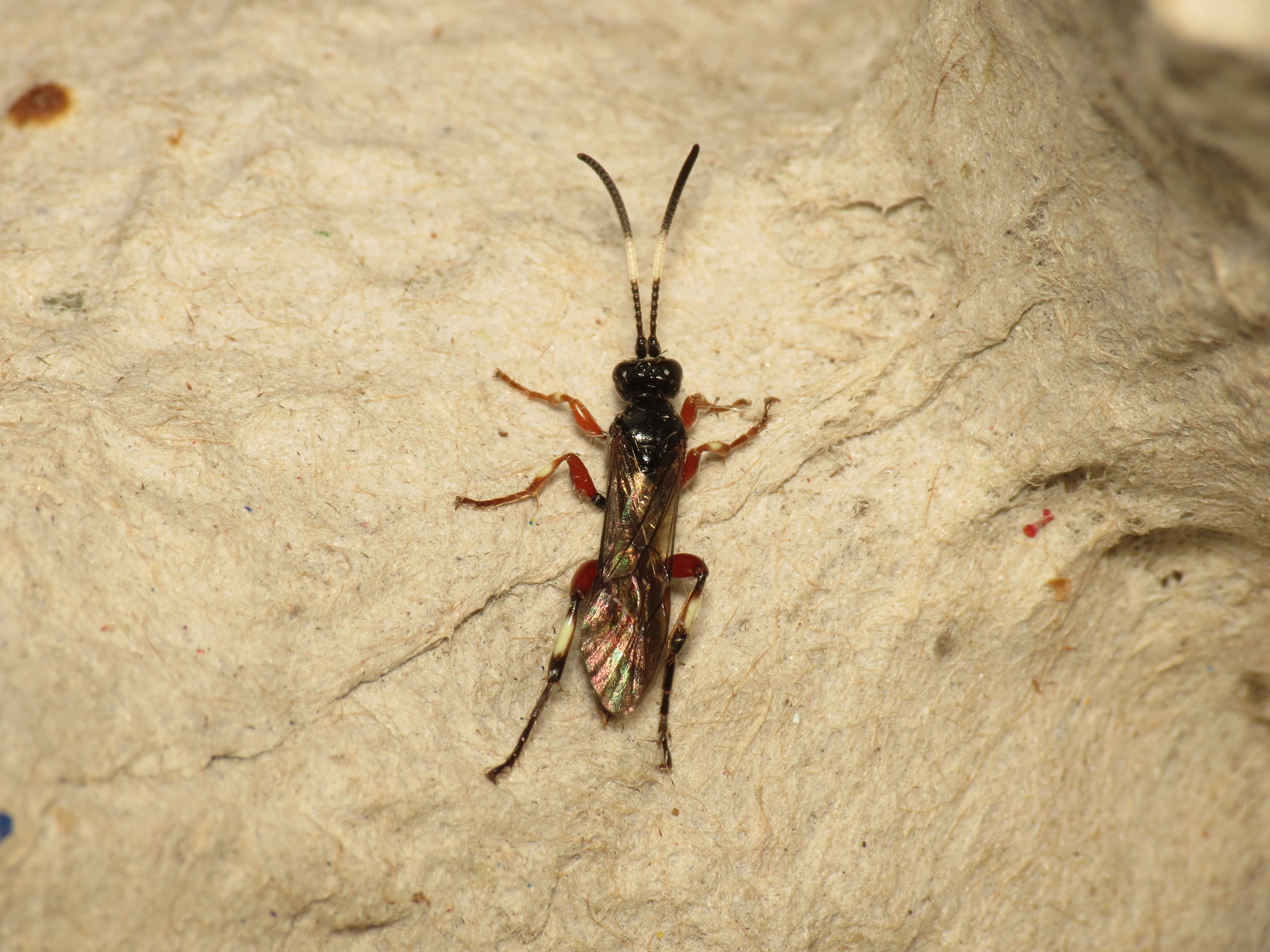
Cratichneumon flavifrons
