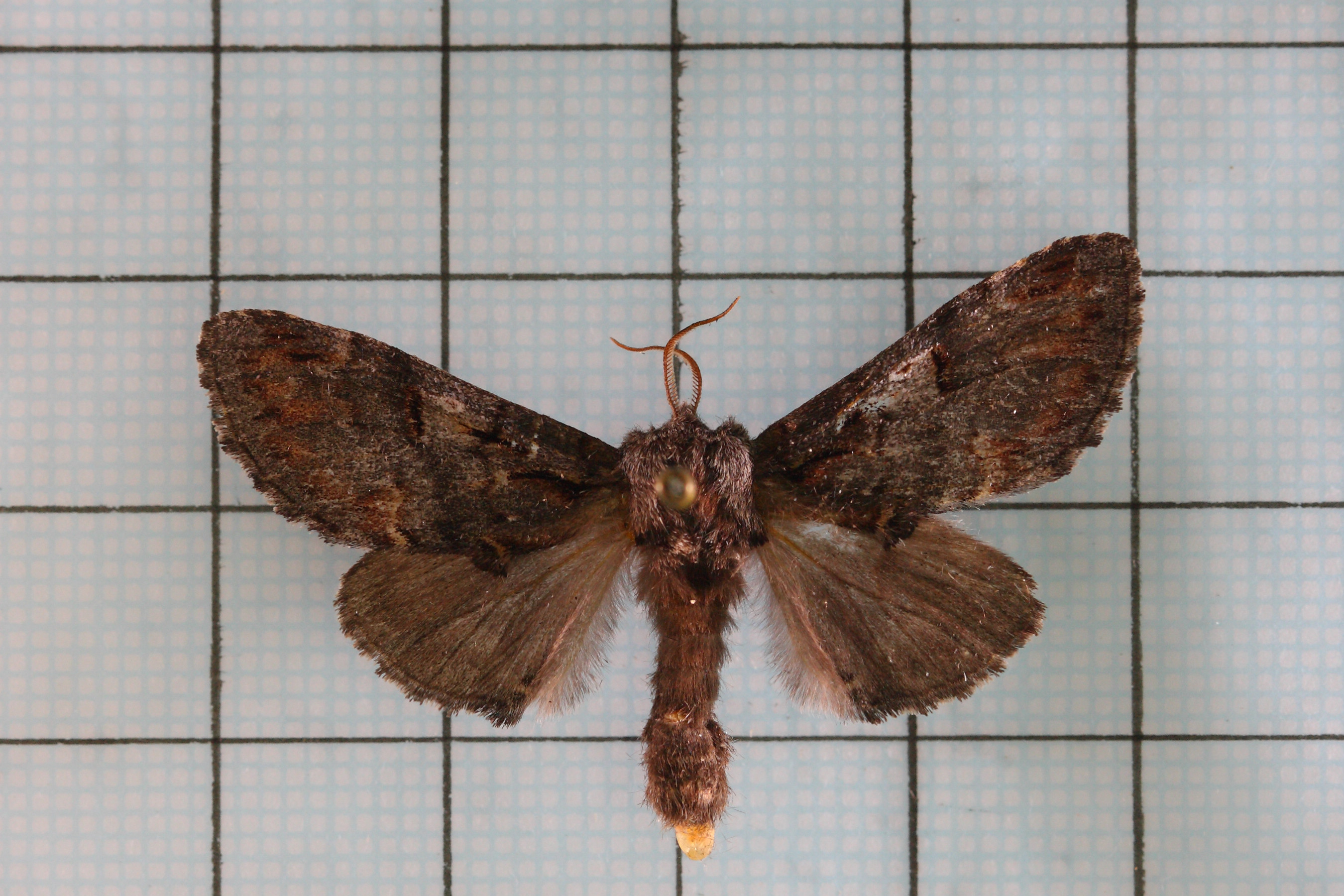

Scientific classification
- Kingdom: Animalia
- Phylum: Arthropoda
- Clade: Pancrustacea
- Class: Insecta
- Order: Lepidoptera
- Superfamily: Noctuoidea
- Family: Notodontidae
- Genus: Notodonta
- Species: N. griseotincta

Binomial name
- Notodonta griseotincta Wileman, 1910

Synonyms
- Notodonta horishana Matsumura, 1925; Notodonta mushensis Matsumura, 1929

= Notodonta griseotincta =

Species of moth

Notodonta griseotincta is a moth of the family Notodontidae first described by Alfred Ernest Wileman in 1910. It is found in Taiwan.
