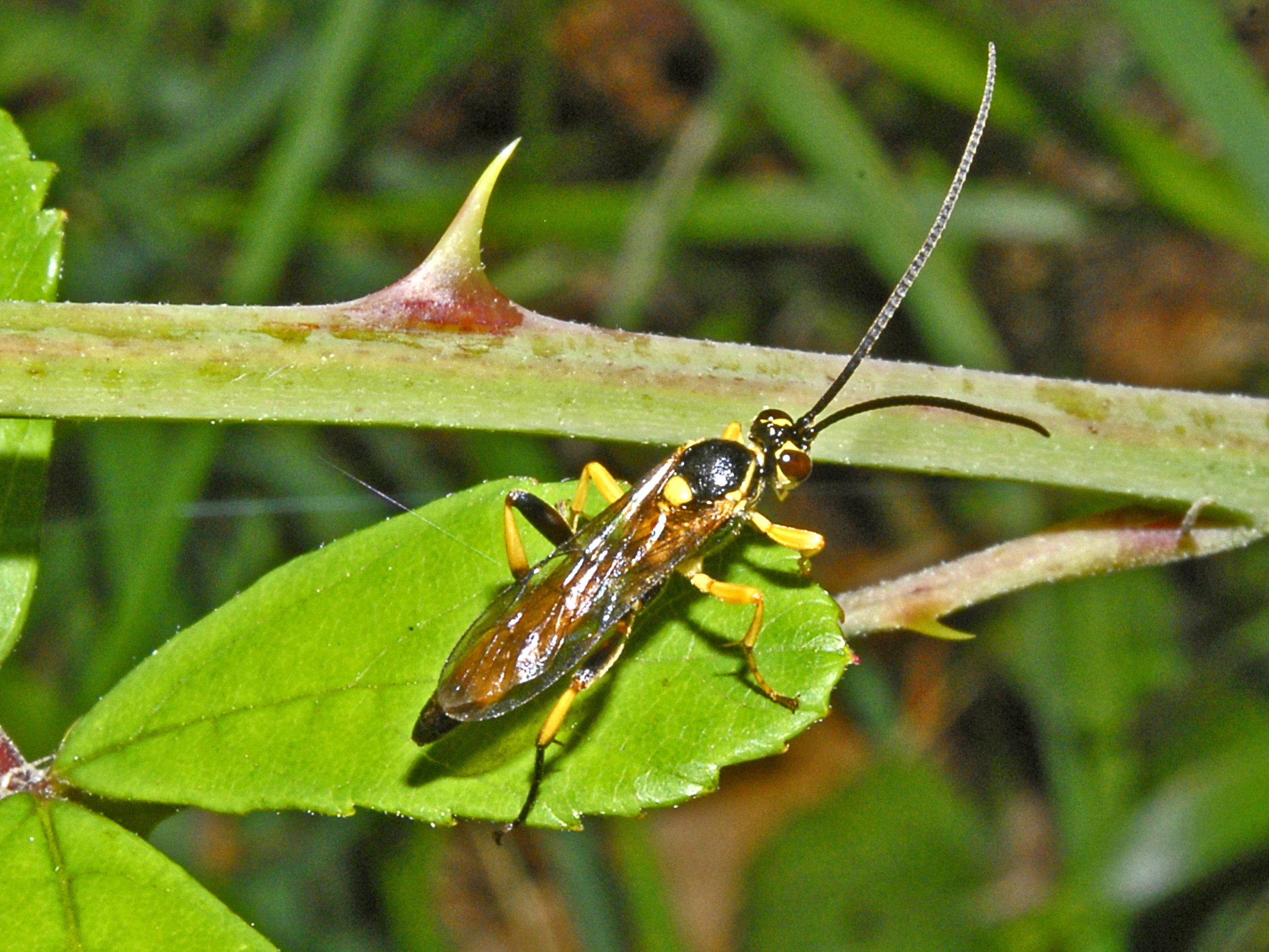
- Male of Cratichneumon coruscator var. luridus

Scientific classification
- Kingdom: Animalia
- Phylum: Arthropoda
- Clade: Pancrustacea
- Class: Insecta
- Order: Hymenoptera
- Family: Ichneumonidae
- Genus: Cratichneumon
- Species: C. coruscator

Binomial name
- Cratichneumon coruscator (Linnaeus, 1758)

Synonyms
- Cratichneumon nigriscapus Constantineanu, Andriescu & Ciochia, 1956; Cratichneumon basiflavus Constantineanu, Andriescu & Ciochia, 1956; Cratichneumon bimaculatus Constantineanu, 1951; Cratichneumon nigrifrons Constantineanu, 1951; Cratichneumon pyrenaeus (Tischbein, 1882); Cratichneumon binotatus (Desvignes, 1856); Cratichneumon metaxanthus (Hartig, 1838); Cratichneumon gasterator (Stephens, 1835); Cratichneumon alacer (Gravenhorst, 1829); Cratichneumon luridus (Gravenhorst, 1829); Cratichneumon ambulator (Muller, 1776)

= Cratichneumon coruscator =

Species of wasp

Cratichneumon coruscator is a species of the parasitic wasp family Ichneumonidae.

== Description ==
Cratichneumon coruscator can reach a length of 9–14 millimetres (0.35–0.55 in) in males, of 7–11 millimetres (0.28–0.43 in) in females. Adults can be found from May to August. Larvae feed on Panolis flammea and other Noctuidae.

== Distribution and habitat ==
This species is present in most of Europe, in the Near East and in the Oriental ecozone. It lives in hedge rows.

== Bibliography ==
- Constantineanu, M.I.; Andriescu, I.; Ciochia, V. (1956) [Contributions a la connaissance de la faune des Ichneumonides de la R.P.Roumaine. Le sous-famille des Ichneumoninae Forster dans le nord-ouest de l'Oltenie.] (in Romanian with French summary), Analele Stiintifice ale Universitatii "Al. I. Cuza" din Iasi. Sect. II a. 2:85-111.
- Constantineanu, M.I. (1951) [Contributions a la connaissance de la faune des Ichneumonides de la Republique Populaire Roumaine. La sous-famille des Ichneumoninae de la plaine de l'Oltenie (Region de Dolj).] (in Rumanian with French summary), Buletin Stintific Sectiunea de Stiinte Biologice Agronomice, Geologice si Geografice. 3(4):675-701.
- Tischbein, P.F.L. (1882) Zusatze und Bemerkungen zu der Ubersicht der europaischen Arten des Genus Ichneumon Gr., Stettiner Entomologische Zeitung. 43:475-486.
- Desvignes, T. (1856) Catalogue of British Ichneumonidae in the collection of the British Museum., London. 120 pp.
- Hartig, T. (1838) Ueber den Raupenfrass im Konigl. Charlottenburger Forste unfern Berlin, wahrend des Sommers 1837., Jahresber. Fortschr. Forstwiss. Forstl. Naturk. Berlin. 1:246-274.
- Stephens, J.F. (1835) Illustrations of British Entomology. Mandibulata. Vol. VII., Baldwin & Cradock, London. 306 pp. [Index, list of plates and errata published in 1845.]
- Gravenhorst, J.L.C. (1829) Ichneumonologia Europaea. Pars I., Vratislaviae. 827 pp.
- Muller, O.F. (1776) Zoologiae Danicae prodromus, seu animalium Daniae et Norvegiae indigenarum characters, nomina et synomyma imprimis popularium., Hafniae. 282 pp. (Ichneumon on pp. 151–160)
- Linnaeus, C. von (1758) Systema naturae per regna tria naturae, secundum classes, ordines, genera, species cum characteribus, differentiis, synonymis locis. Tomus I. Editio decima, reformata., Laurnetii Salvii, Holmiae. 824 pp. (A photographic facsimile by British Museum (Natural History), London. 1956.)
