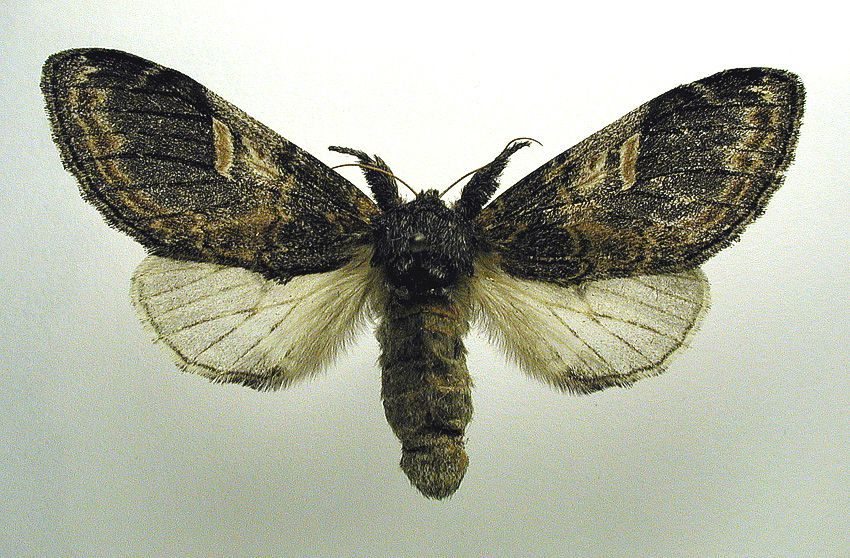

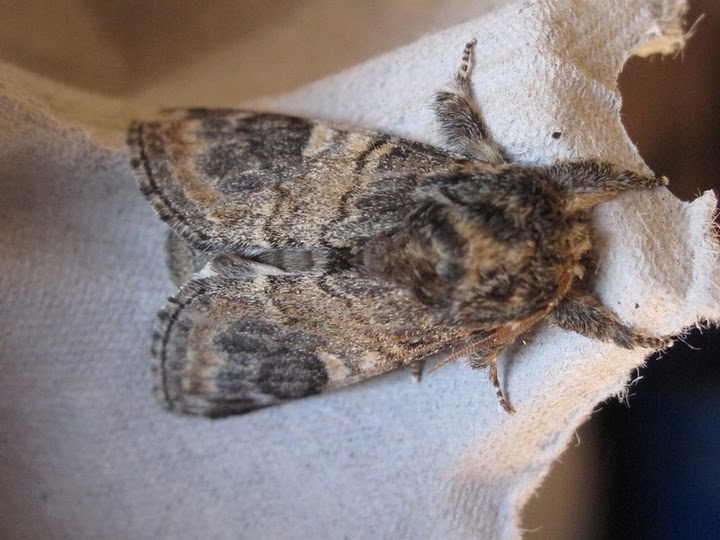

Scientific classification
- Kingdom: Animalia
- Phylum: Arthropoda
- Clade: Pancrustacea
- Class: Insecta
- Order: Lepidoptera
- Superfamily: Noctuoidea
- Family: Notodontidae
- Genus: Notodonta
- Species: N. tritophus

Binomial name
- Notodonta tritophus (Denis & Schiffermüller, 1775)

Synonyms
- Bombyx tritophus Denis & Schiffermüller, 1775; Phalaena phoebe Siebert, 1790

= Notodonta tritophus =

Three-humped prominent

Species of moth

Notodonta tritophus, the three-humped prominent, is a moth of the family Notodontidae. The species was first described by Michael Denis and Ignaz Schiffermüller in 1775. It is found in most of Europe (although it is a very rare immigrant Great Britain), east to the Caucasus and Armenia.

The wingspan is 45–55 mm. Adults are on wing from April to August in two generations in western Europe.

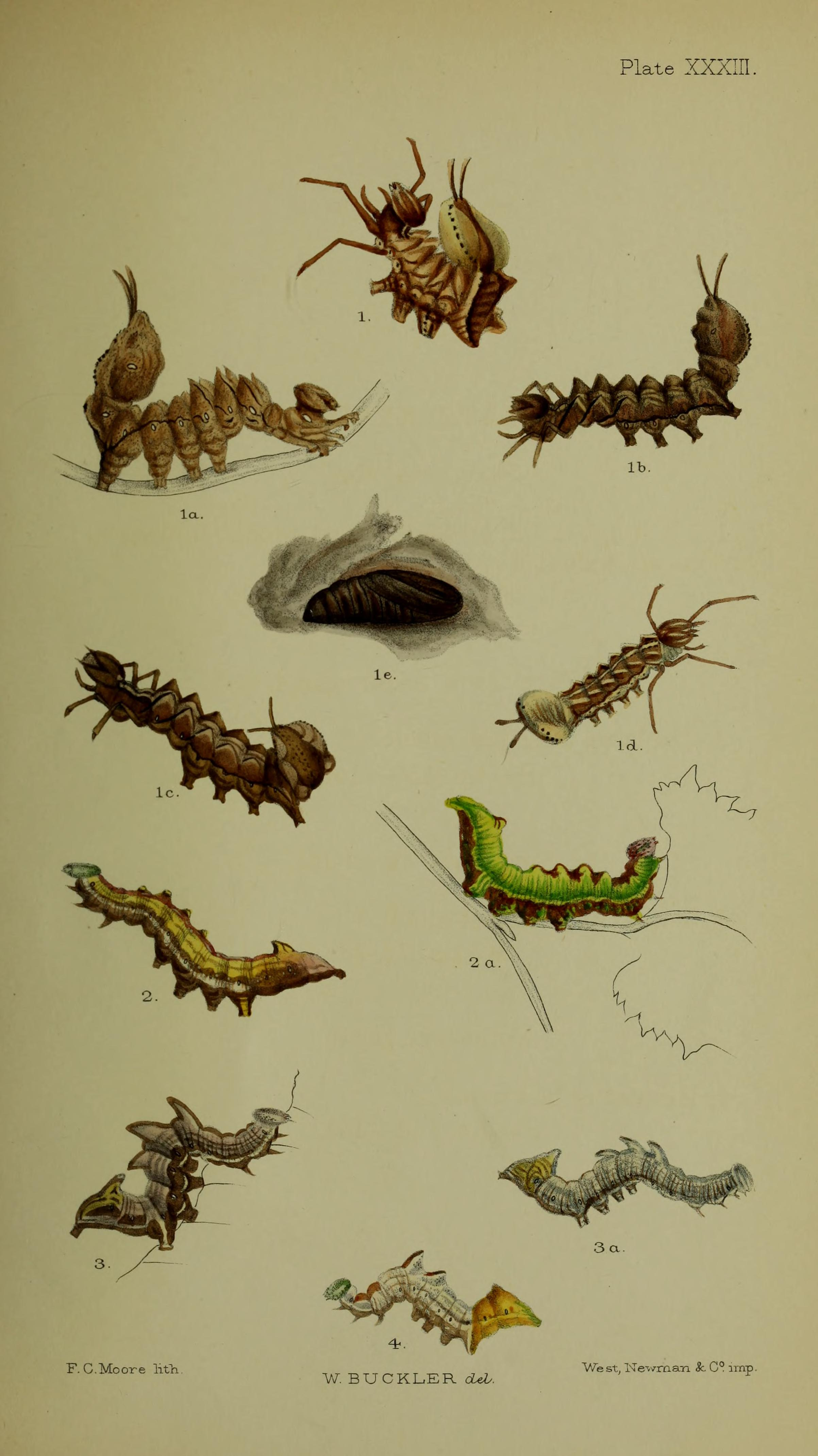
Figs. 3, 3a larvae after last moult

The larvae mainly feed on Populus species, mainly aspen (Populus tremula), and sometimes willows (Salix species) and birch (Betula species). Larvae can be found from June to September. The species overwinters in the pupal stage.

== Subspecies ==
- Notodonta tritophus tritophus
- Notodonta tritophus irfana (de Freina, 1983)
