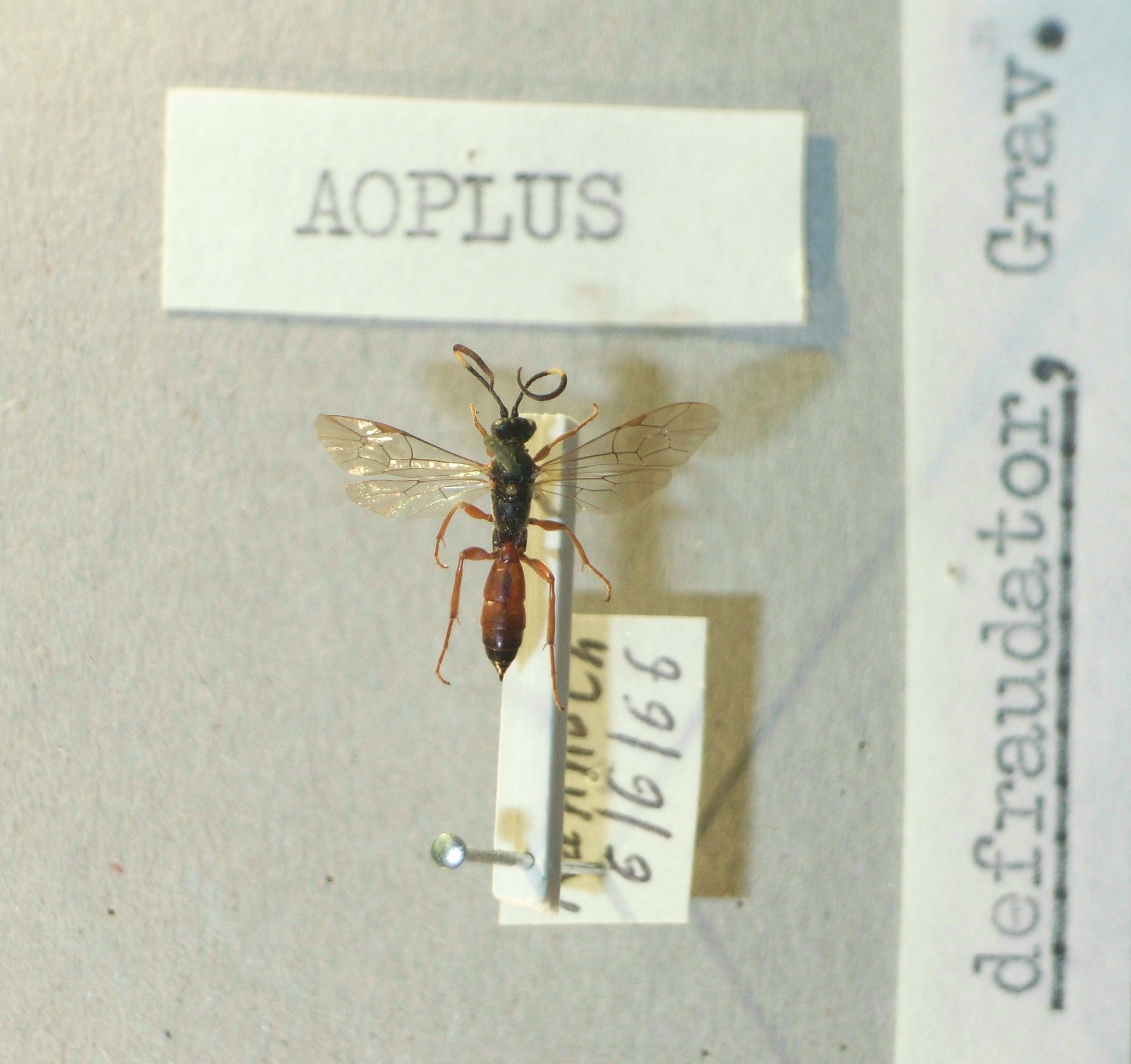

Scientific classification
- Kingdom: Animalia
- Phylum: Arthropoda
- Class: Insecta
- Order: Hymenoptera
- Family: Ichneumonidae
- Genus: Aoplus
- Species: A. defraudator

Binomial name
- Aoplus defraudator (Wesmael, 1845)

Synonyms
- Aoplus angustus (Tischbein, 1863); Aoplus jemilleri (Kriechbaumer, 1893); Aoplus sabaudus (Berthoumieu, 1904)

= Aoplus defraudator =

Species of wasp

Aoplus defraudator is a species of wasp in the genus Aoplus. It was first identified by Constantin Wesmael, in 1845.

== Distribution ==
It is found in many parts of the world, including Austria, Belarus, Belgium, Bulgaria, Czechoslovakia, Finland, France, Germany, Hungary, Ireland, Italy, the Netherlands, Norway, Poland, Romania, Spain, and the United Kingdom.
