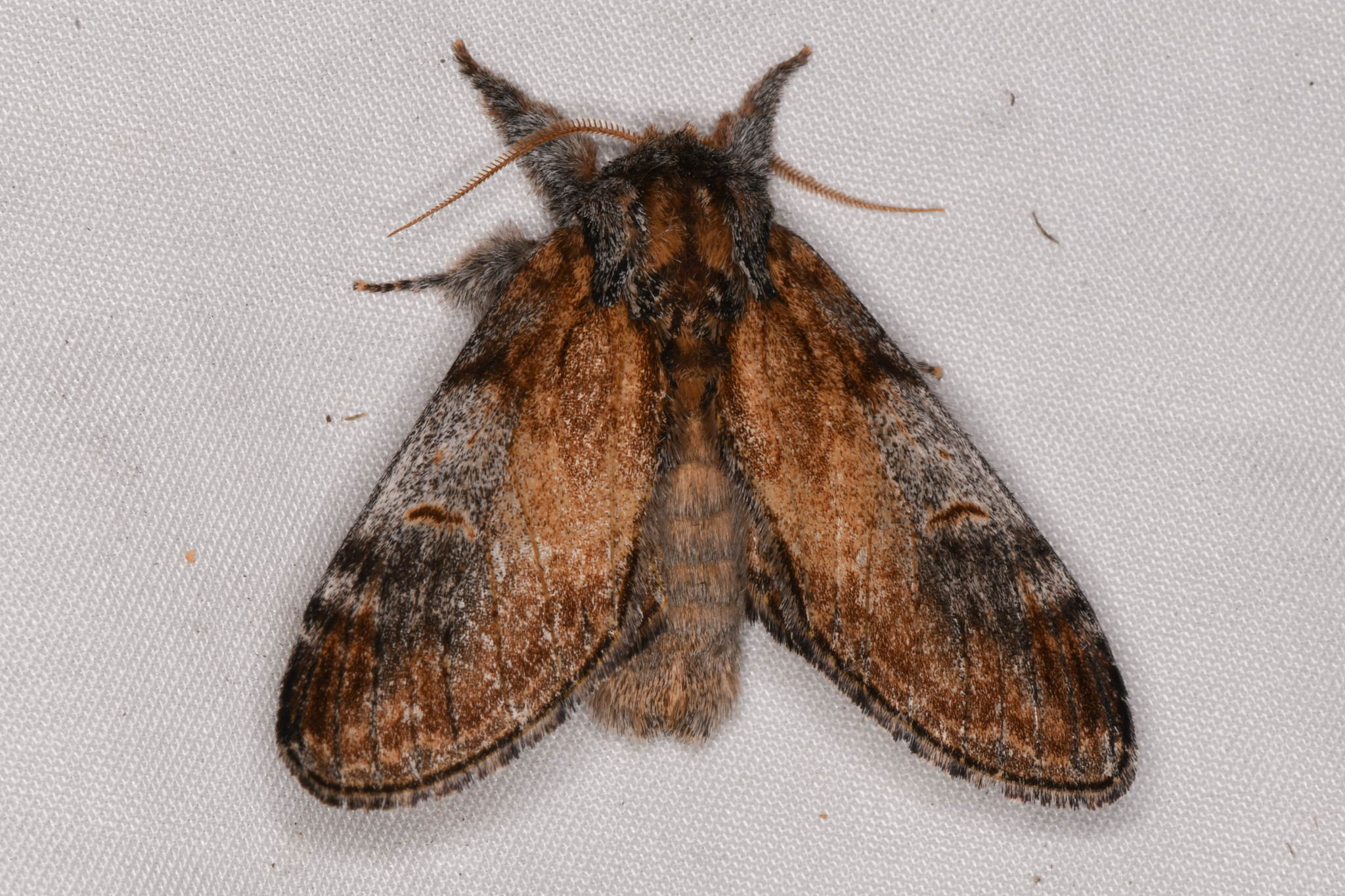

Scientific classification
- Kingdom: Animalia
- Phylum: Arthropoda
- Clade: Pancrustacea
- Class: Insecta
- Order: Lepidoptera
- Superfamily: Noctuoidea
- Family: Notodontidae
- Genus: Notodonta
- Species: N. pacifica

Binomial name
- Notodonta pacifica Behr, 1892

= Notodonta pacifica =

Species of moth

Notodonta pacifica is a species of moth in the family Notodontidae (the prominents). It was first described by Hans Hermann Behr in 1892 and it is found in North America.
