= Notodonta scitipennis =

Scientific classification
- Kingdom: Animalia
- Phylum: Arthropoda
- Clade: Pancrustacea
- Class: Insecta
- Order: Lepidoptera
- Superfamily: Noctuoidea
- Family: Notodontidae
- Genus: Notodonta
- Species: N. scitipennis

Binomial name
- Notodonta scitipennis Walker, 1862

Synonyms
- Notodonta stragula Grote, 1864

Species of moth

Notodonta scitipennis, the finned-willow prominent or base-streaked prominent, is a species of moth in the family Notodontidae (the prominents). It was first described by Francis Walker in 1862 and it is found in North America.

The MONA or Hodges number for Notodonta scitipennis is 7926.
