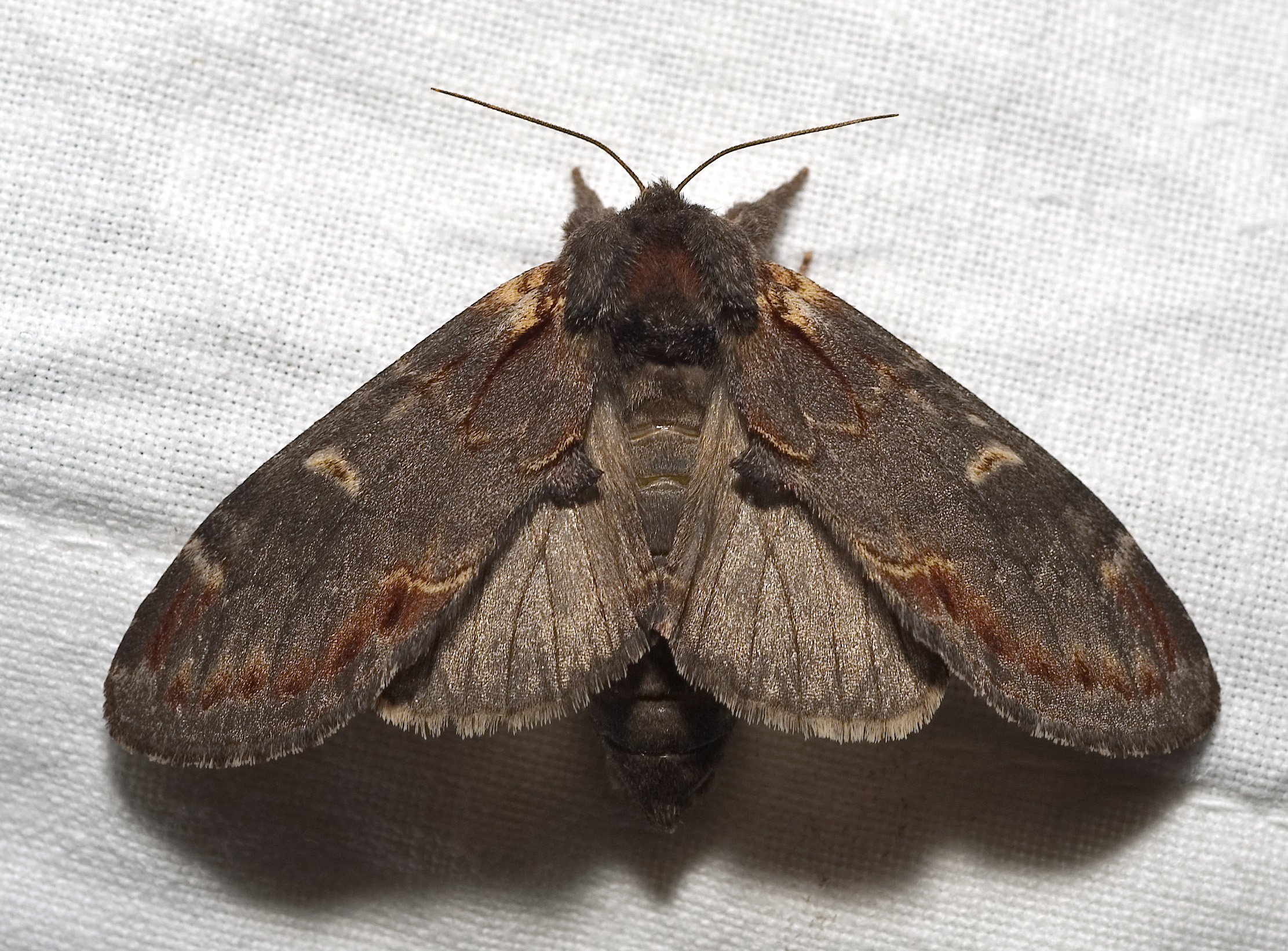
- Notodonta dromedarius

Scientific classification
- Kingdom: Animalia
- Phylum: Arthropoda
- Clade: Pancrustacea
- Class: Insecta
- Order: Lepidoptera
- Superfamily: Noctuoidea
- Family: Notodontidae
- Tribe: Notodontini
- Genus: Notodonta; Ochsenheimer, 1810

= Notodonta =

Genus of moths

Notodonta is a genus of moths of the family Notodontidae erected by Ferdinand Ochsenheimer in 1810.

== Selected species ==
- Notodonta albicosta (Matsumura, 1920)
- Notodonta dembowskii Oberthür, 1879
- Notodonta dromedarius (Linnaeus, 1767)
- Notodonta griseotincta Wileman, 1910
- Notodonta jankowski Oberthür, 1879
- Notodonta pacifica Behr, 1892
- Notodonta roscida Kiriakoff, 1963
- Notodonta scitipennis Walker, 1862
- Notodonta torva (Hübner, 1803)
  - Notodonta torva simplaria Graef, 1881
- Notodonta trachitso Oberthür, 1894
- Notodonta tritophus (Denis & Schiffermüller, 1775)
- Notodonta ziczac (Linnaeus, 1758)
