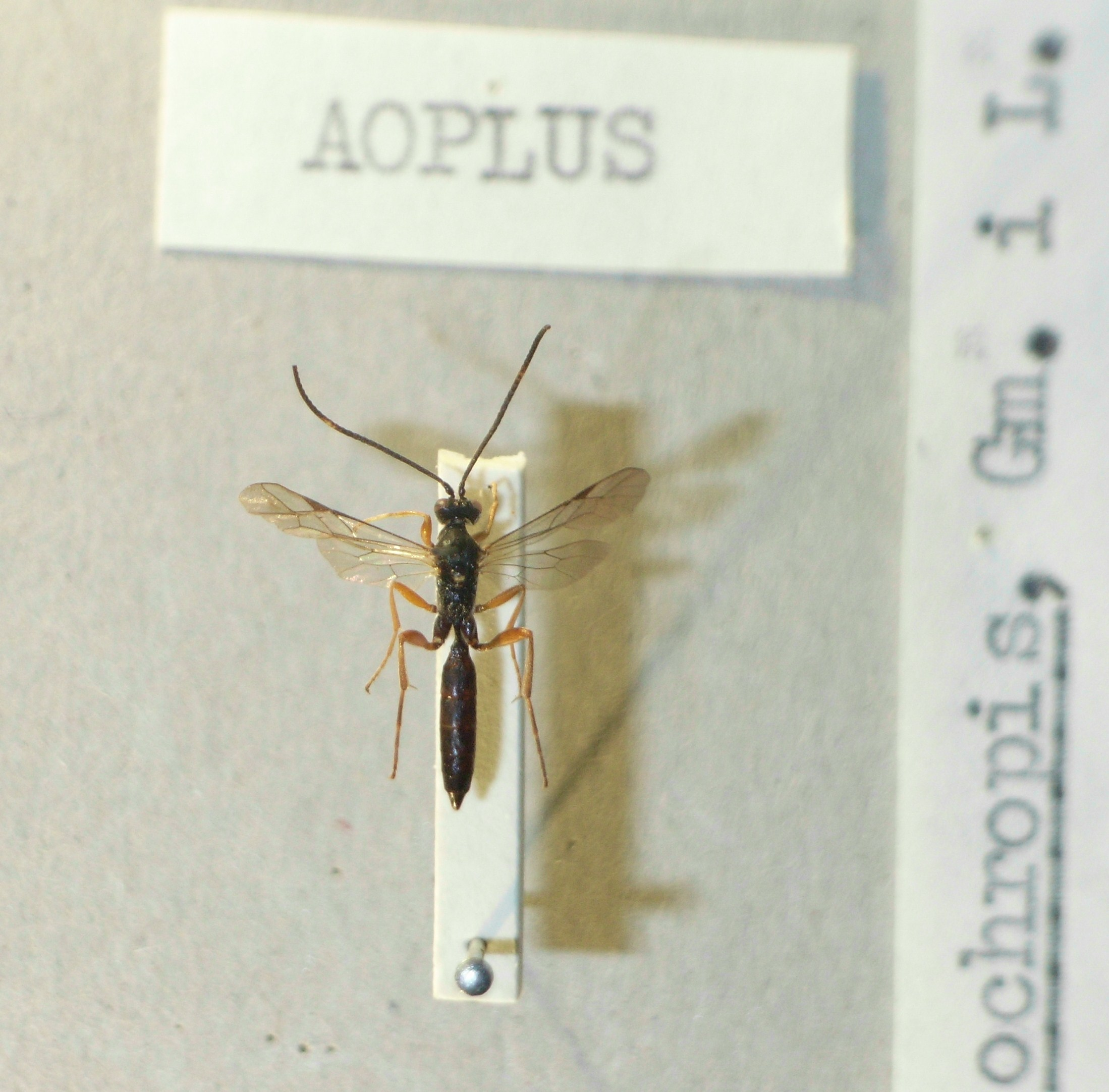
- Aoplus ochropis

Scientific classification
- Domain: Eukaryota
- Kingdom: Animalia
- Phylum: Arthropoda
- Class: Insecta
- Order: Hymenoptera
- Family: Ichneumonidae
- Subfamily: Ichneumoninae
- Tribe: Ichneumonini
- Genus: Aoplus; Tischbein, 1874

= Aoplus =

Genus of wasps

Aoplus is a genus of insects belonging to the family Ichneumonidae.

The genus was first described by Tischbein in 1874.

The species of this genus are found in Europe and North America.

Selected species:

- Aoplus biannulatorius (Thunberg 1824)
- Aoplus castaneus (Gravenhorst, 1820)
- Aoplus confirmatus (Cresson, 1877)
- Aoplus defraudator (Wesmael, 1845)
- Aoplus groenlandicus (Lundbeck, 1897)
- Aoplus lugubris (Berthoumieu, 1896)
- Aoplus ocellator Riedel, 2020
- Aoplus ochropis (Gmelin, 1790)
- Aoplus ruficeps (Gravenhorst, 1829)
- Aoplus theresae (Berthoumieu, 1896)
