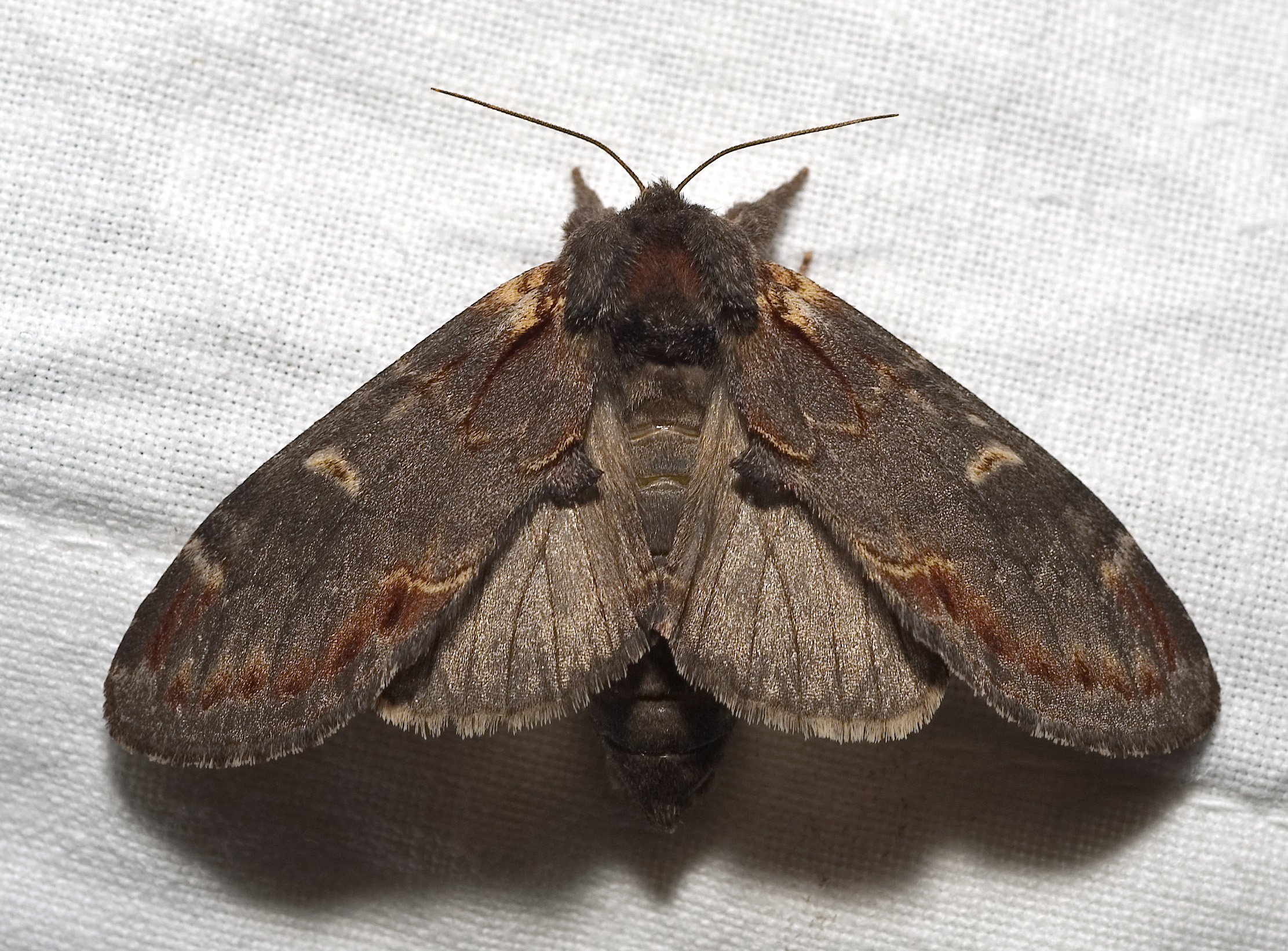

Scientific classification
- Kingdom: Animalia
- Phylum: Arthropoda
- Clade: Pancrustacea
- Class: Insecta
- Order: Lepidoptera
- Superfamily: Noctuoidea
- Family: Notodontidae
- Genus: Notodonta
- Species: N. dromedarius

Binomial name
- Notodonta dromedarius (Linnaeus, 1767)

= Notodonta dromedarius =

Iron prominent

Species of moth

Notodonta dromedarius, the iron prominent, is a moth of the family Notodontidae. The species was first described by Carl Linnaeus in 1767. It is found in Europe and Anatolia.

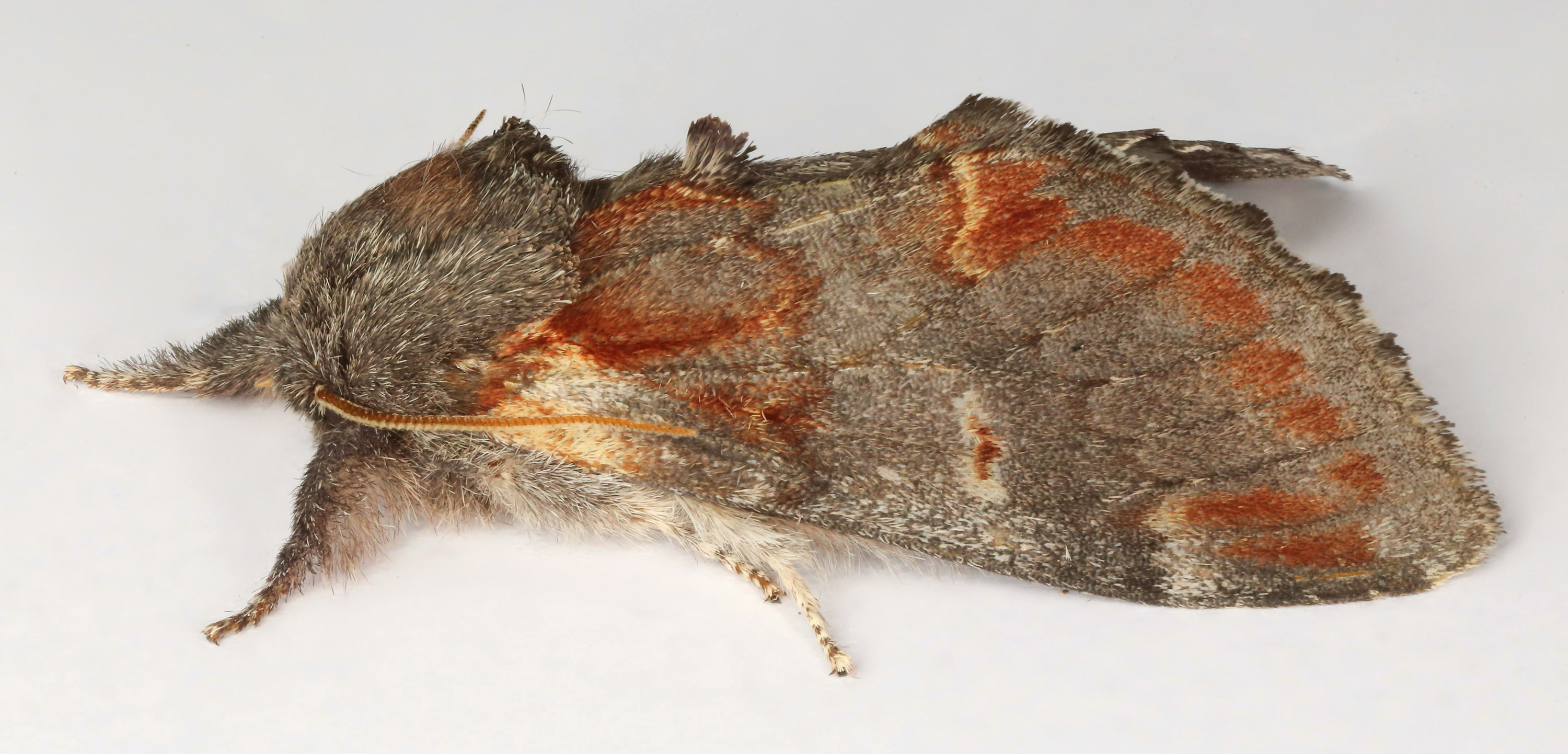

== Description ==
The wingspan is 35–40 mm. Notodonta dromedarius has grey or dark brown forewings with rusty and yellowish stains. A broken rust-brown band runs along the outside edge of the forewing. There is a small discal spot, a postmedial crossline which is often broken and outer margins which are suffused dark red. The hindwings are usually pale grey-brown with dark veining. The colouring is very variable and very dark specimens are found.

Description in Seitz-Forewing pale brownish grey to dark drome- grey-brown, with light-edged dark brown pre- and postdiscal dentate bands, the dark discal spot likewise pale- . edged; marginal area more or less distinctly rust -brown around a dark longitudinal streak, the rather broad submarginal band also bright rust-brown. Hindwing grey-brown or predominantly grey. In specimens whose ground-colour is faded on account of age or is not properly developed, the bright markings are very prominent. On the other hand, quite fresh specimens are almost uniformly black-brown, being so dark that the markings are hardly visible. — Central Europe, northward to Esthonia and Livonia, southward to Catalonia and Northern Italy; Armenia; according to Graeser also in Amurland. — Larva yellowish green or brown-red, in both cases with a dark red-brown dorsal stripe from head to abdominal segment 4; segments 1 —4 of abdomen each with a large dark red-brown tubercle; an interrupted dark longitudinal marking laterally above the legs. July—August on Willow, Birch, Hazel and Alder. Pupa black-brown, in a cell in the ground. Moth May—June and July-—August. Some of the pupae of the summer-brood hibernate. In the Baltic provinces only one brood.

== Biology ==
The moth flies from April to August depending on the location.

The larvae feed on Corylus avellana, birch, alder and oak.

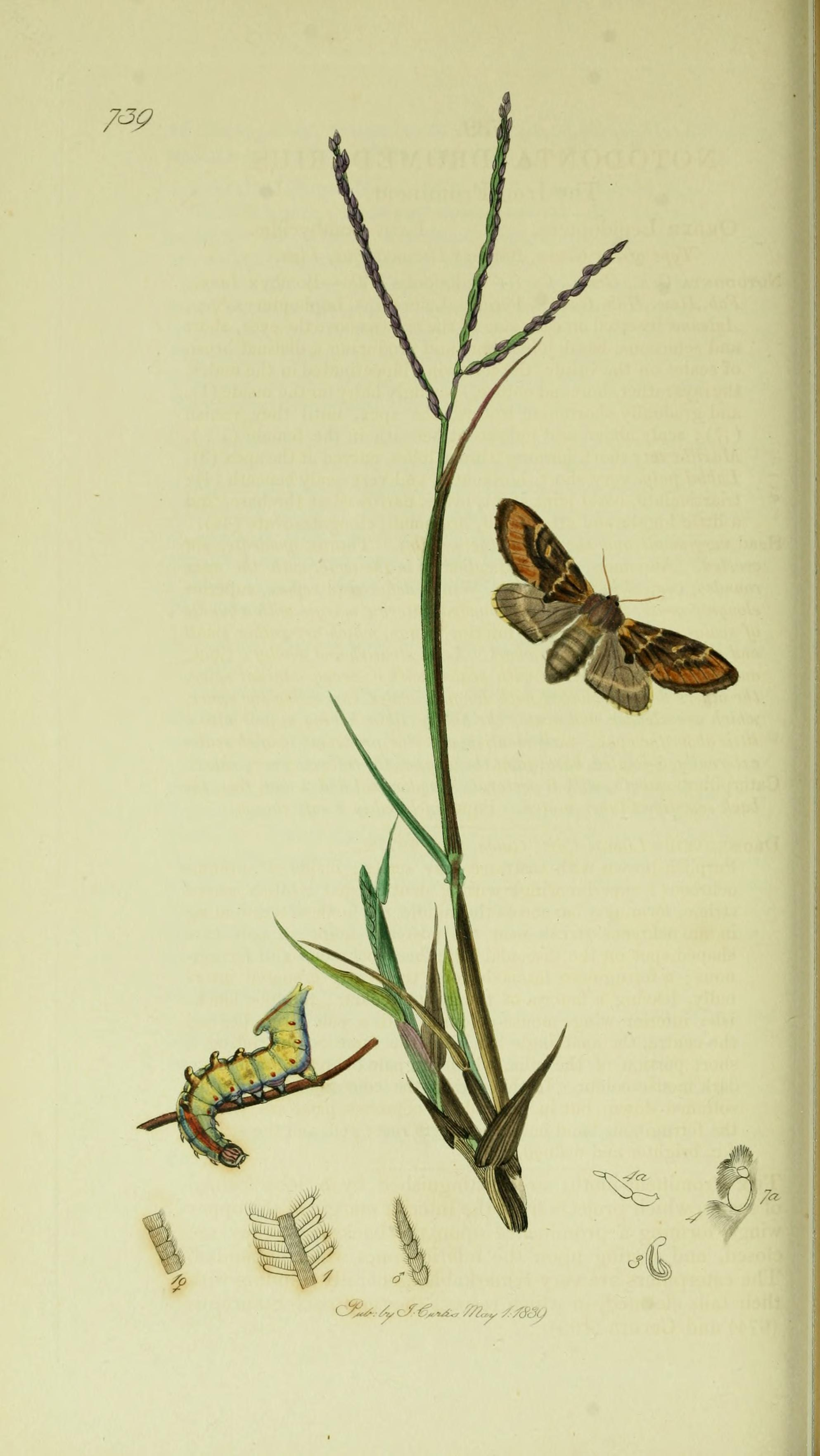
Illustration from John Curtis's British Entomology Volume 5

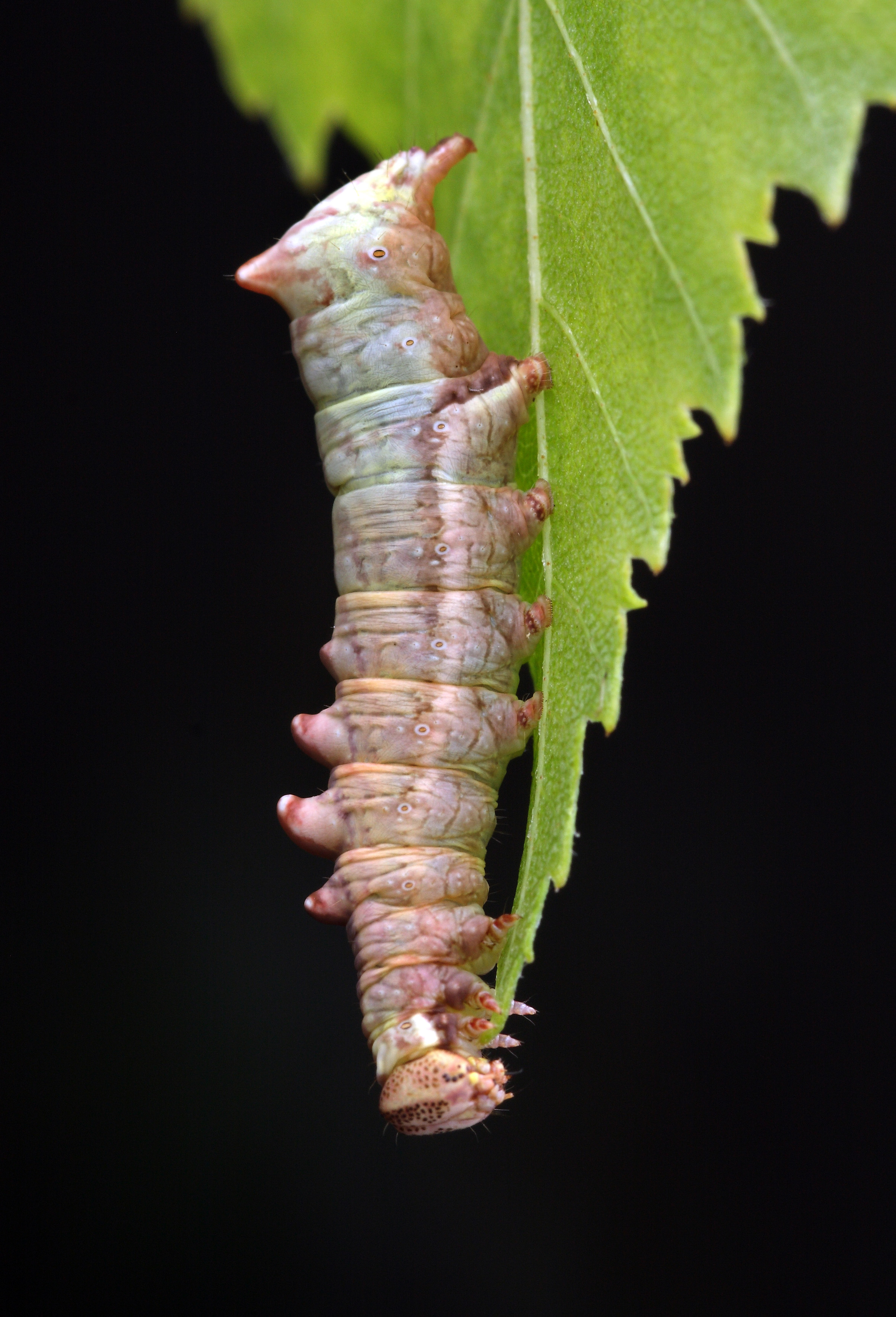
Larva
