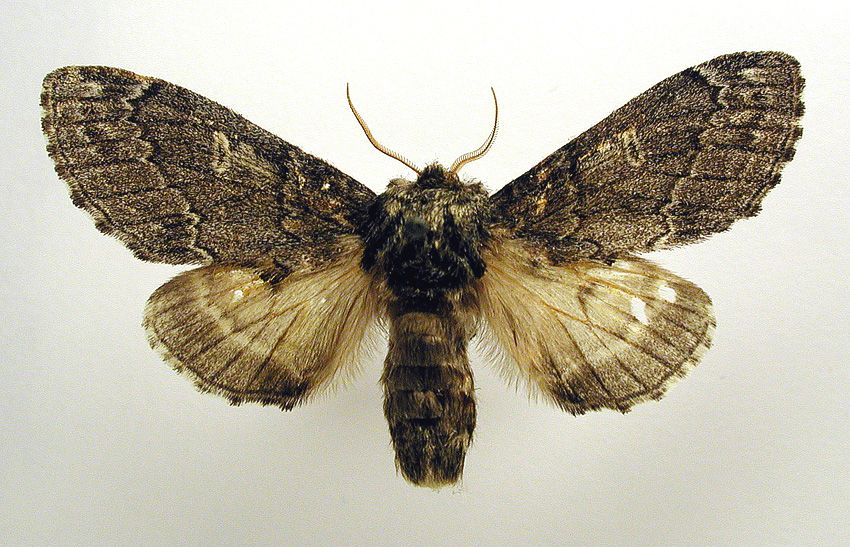

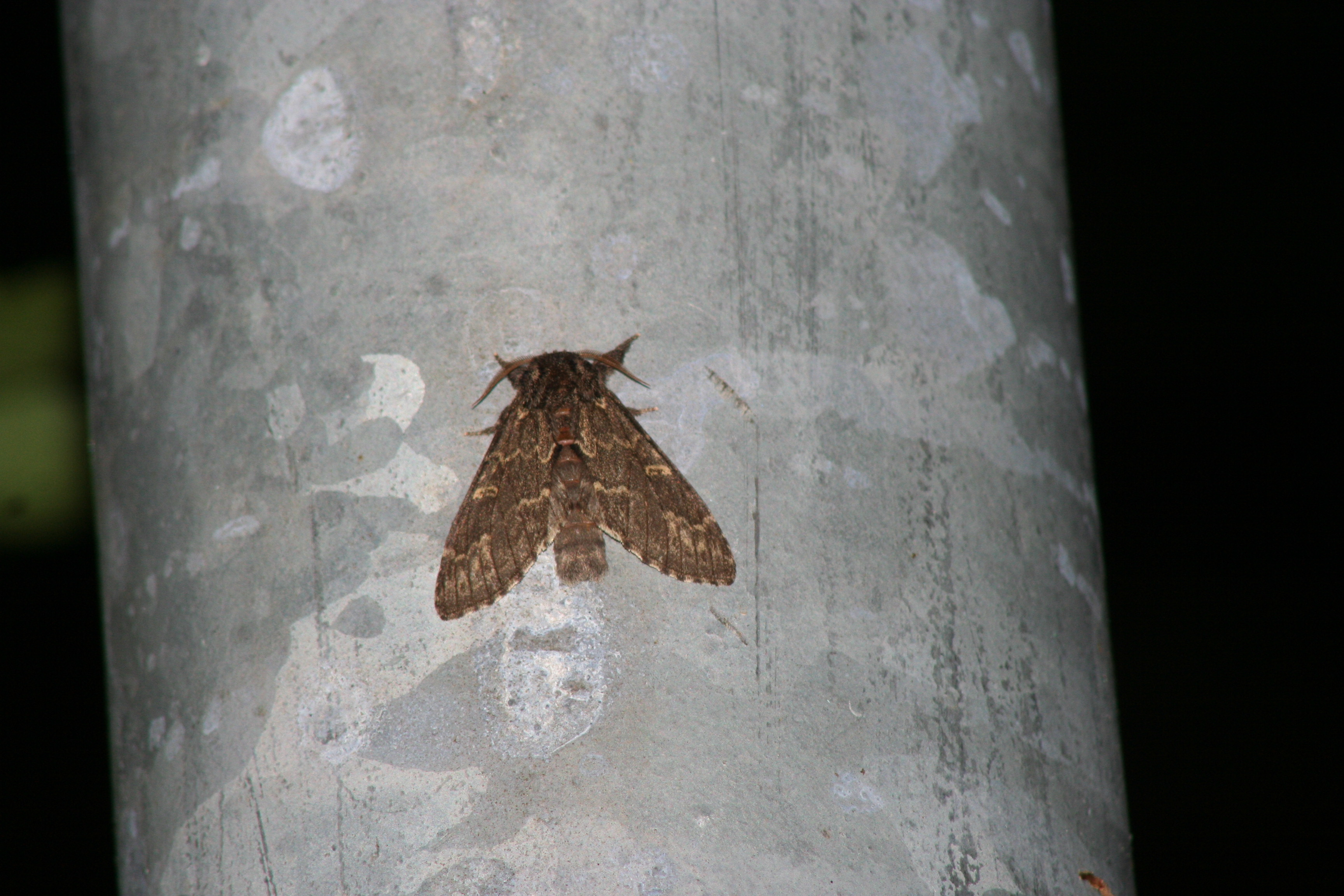

Scientific classification
- Kingdom: Animalia
- Phylum: Arthropoda
- Clade: Pancrustacea
- Class: Insecta
- Order: Lepidoptera
- Superfamily: Noctuoidea
- Family: Notodontidae
- Genus: Notodonta
- Species: N. torva

Binomial name
- Notodonta torva (Hübner, 1803)

Synonyms
- Peridea musculus Kiriakoff, 1963

= Notodonta torva =

Large dark prominent

Species of moth

Notodonta torva, the large dark prominent, is a moth of the family Notodontidae. The species was first described by Jacob Hübner in 1803. It is found in most of Europe (although it is a very rare immigrant to Great Britain), east to the China, Korea and Japan.

The wingspan is about 48 mm. Adults are on the wing from the end of April to August in two generations in western Europe.

The larvae mainly feed on Populus species (including P. tremula and P. nigra) and Salix species (including S. caprea, S. cinerea and S. phylicifolia). Larvae can be found in June and again from August to September. The species overwinters in the pupal stage.

== Gallery ==
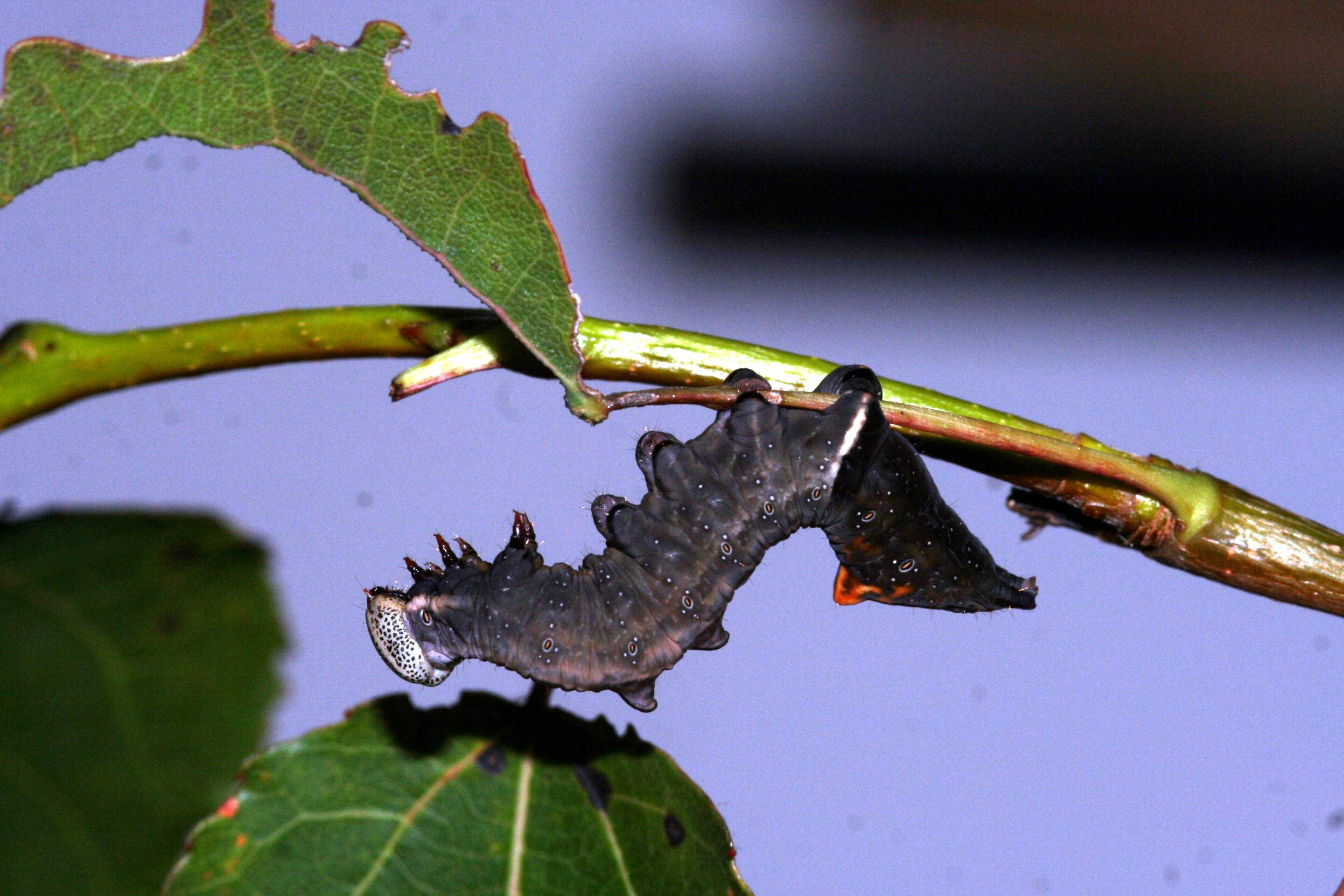
Larva

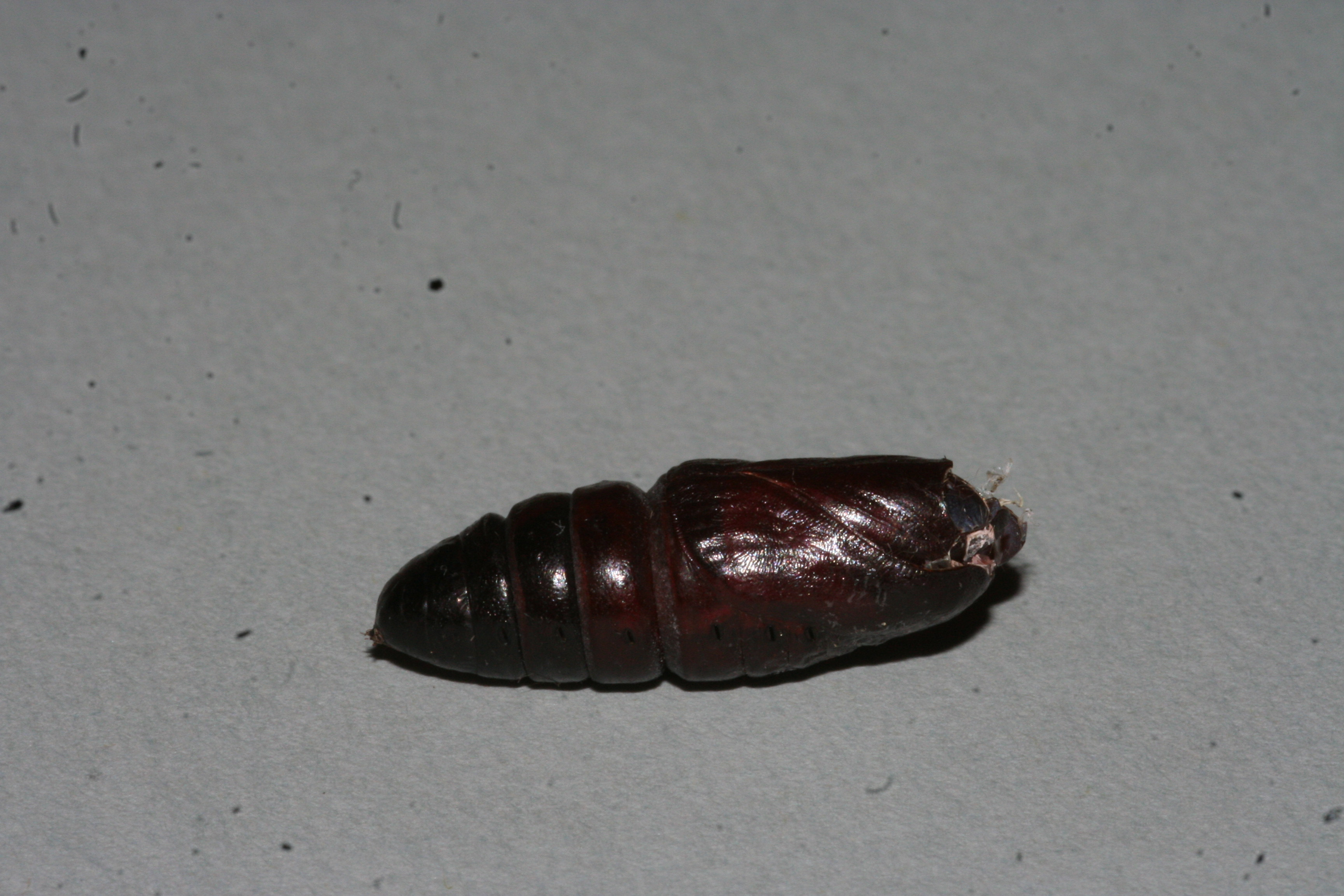
Pupa

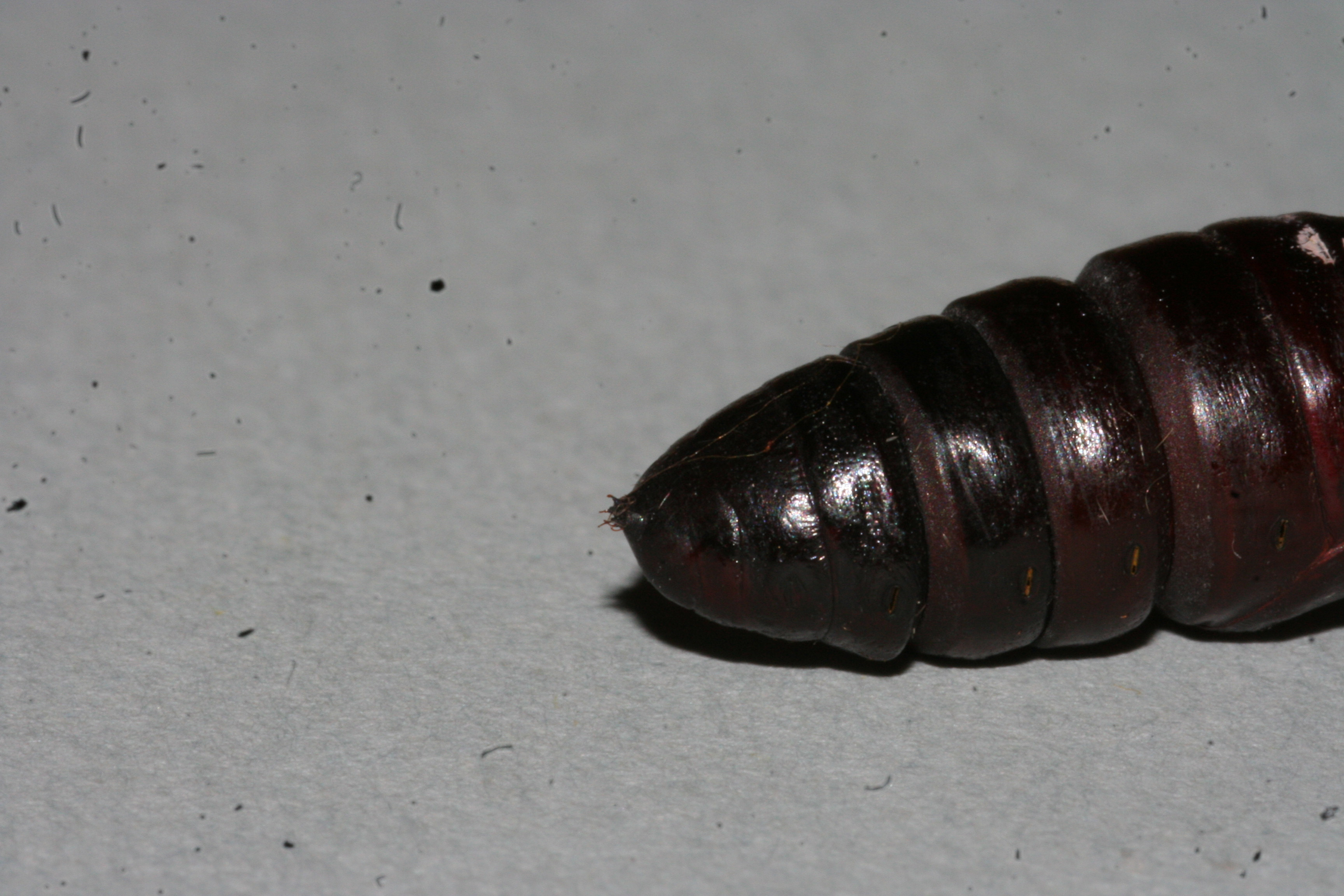
Pupa, detail
