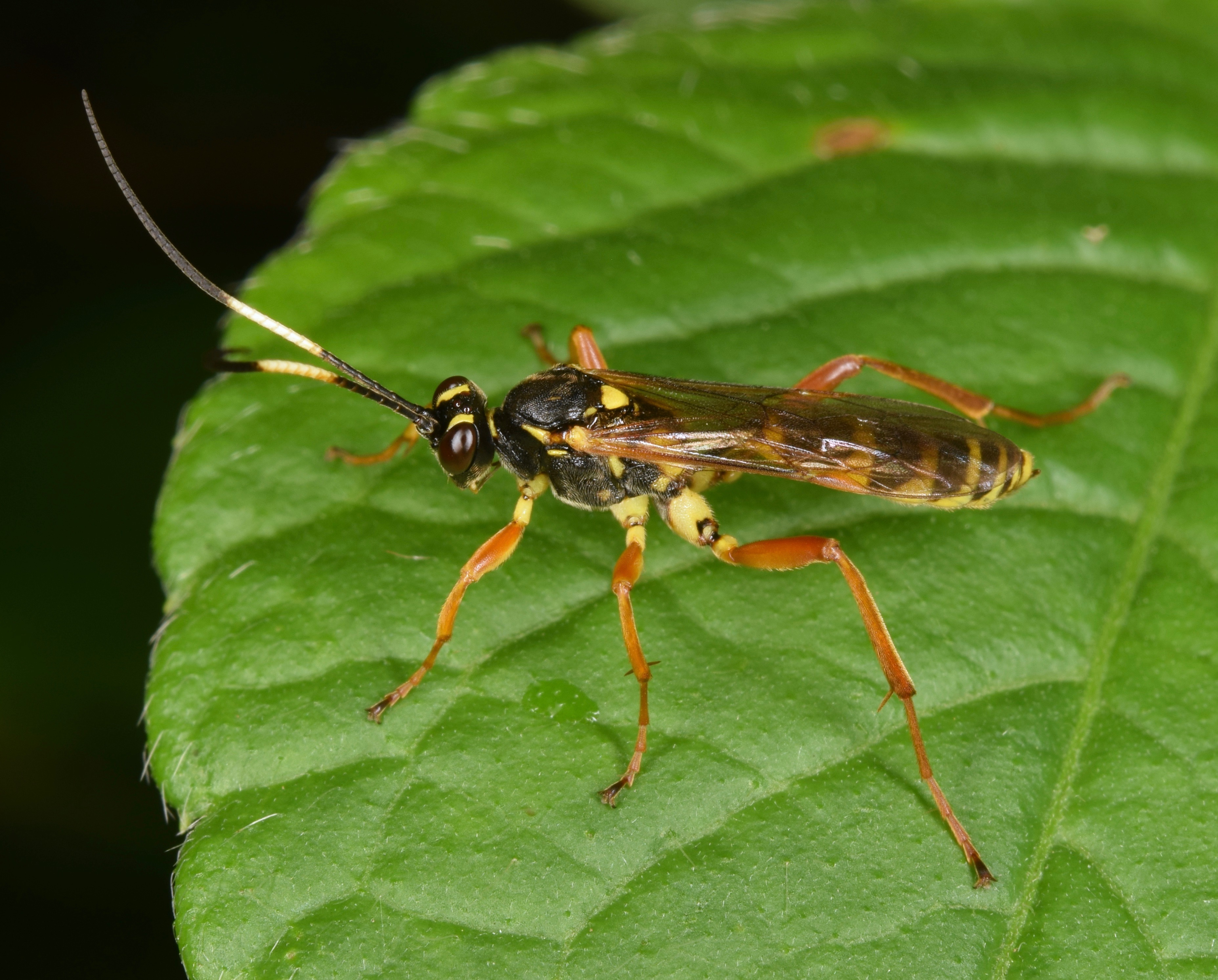

Scientific classification
- Kingdom: Animalia
- Phylum: Arthropoda
- Clade: Pancrustacea
- Class: Insecta
- Order: Hymenoptera
- Family: Ichneumonidae
- Genus: Setanta
- Species: S. compta

Binomial name
- Setanta compta (Thomas Say, 1835)

Synonyms
- Setanta atrifrons (Cresson, 1864)

= Setanta compta =

Species of wasp

Setanta compta is a small ichneumon wasp recorded in North and South America and Asia. The species has not been successfully reared in captivity and has observed peaks of activity in early June and mid September.

Two disputed subspecies, Setanta compta compta and Setanta compta marginata, have been proposed.

Females have white or yellow bands on the antennae while males have entirely black antennae.
