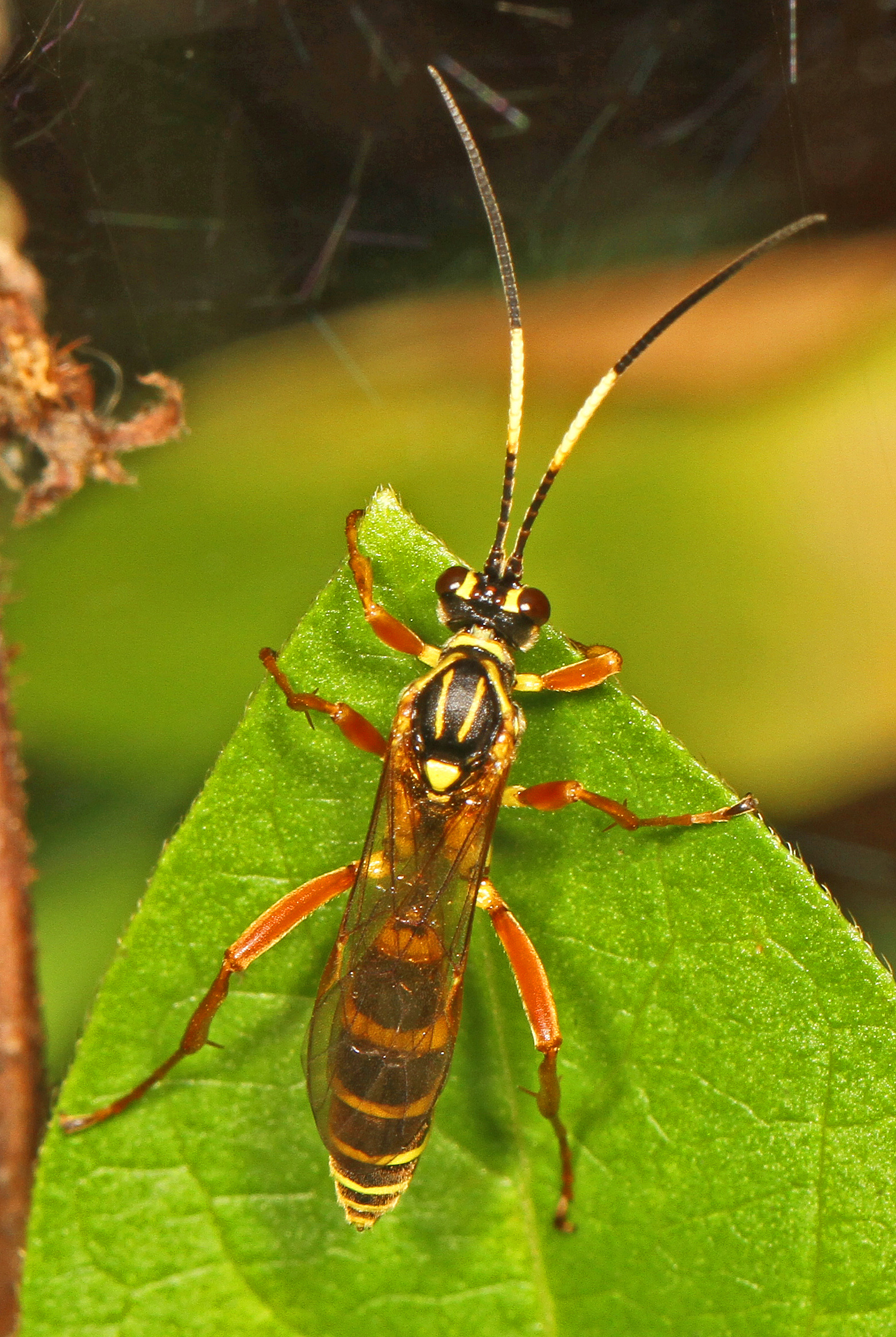
- Setanta compta marginata photographed in Mason Neck, Virginia

Scientific classification
- Domain: Eukaryota
- Kingdom: Animalia
- Phylum: Arthropoda
- Class: Insecta
- Order: Hymenoptera
- Superfamily: Ichneumonoidea
- Family: Ichneumonidae
- Genus: Setanta; Cameron, 1901

= Setanta (wasp) =

Genus of wasps

Setanta is a genus of ichneumonid wasp in the subfamily Ichneumoninae. It occurs in the Neotropical, Oriental, and Tropical regions.

== Species ==
- Setanta abita (Cresson, 1873)^{c g e}
- Setanta albitarsis Heinrich, 1974^{c g e}
- Setanta apicalis (Uchida, 1926)^{c e}
- Setanta birmanica Heinrich, 1974^{c g}
- Setanta caerulea (Brulle, 1846)^{c}
- Setanta centrosa (Cresson, 1868)^{c g e}
- Setanta chichimeca (Cresson, 1868)^{c g e}
- Setanta compta (Say, 1835)^{c g b e}
  - Setanta compta marginata (Provancher, 1882) ^{c b e}
- Setanta decorosa (Cresson, 1868)^{c g e}
- Setanta dura (Cresson, 1874)^{c g e}
- Setanta formosana (Uchida, 1926)^{c e}
- Setanta guatemalensis (Cameron, 1885)^{c e}
- Setanta himalayensis (Cameron, 1905)^{c e}
- Setanta maculosa (Smith, 1879)^{c g e}
- Setanta malinensis Heinrich, 1934 ^{c g e}
- Setanta nedumalba Heinrich, 1974^{c g e}
- Setanta nigricans (Uchida, 1926)^{c e}
- Setanta nigrifrons (Uchida, 1926)^{c g e}
- Setanta opacula (Cresson, 1874)^{c g e}
- Setanta parsimonica (Cameron, 1885)^{c g e}
- Setanta rufipes Cameron, 1901^{c e}
- Setanta urumuchiensis Yu & Sheng, 1994^{c g e}

Data sources: c = Catalogue of Life, g = GBIF, b = Bugguide.net, e = Encyclopedia of Life,
