= Checklist of UK recorded Ichneumonidae =

In this checklist are presented all wasp species of family Ichneumonidae found within the UK.

== Index ==
A B C D E F G H I J K L M N O P Q R S T U V W X Y Z

== Checklist ==
=== A ===
- Absyrtus vicinator (Thunberg, 1822)
- Acaenitus dubitator (Panzer, 1800)
- Achaius oratorius (Fabricius, 1793)
- Aclastus gracilis (Thomson, 1884)
- Aclastus minutus (Bridgman, 1886)
- Aclastus solutus (Thomson, 1884)
- Acolobus albimanus (Gravenhorst, 1829)
- Acolobus sericeus Wesmael, 1844
- Aconias tarsatus (Bridgman, 1881)
- Acrodactyla degener (Haliday, 1838)
- Acrodactyla madida (Haliday, 1838)
- Acrodactyla qundrisculpta (Gravenhorst, 1820)
- Acrolyta distincta (Bridgman, 1883)
- Acrolyta marginata (Bridgman, 1883)
- Acrolyta submarginata (Bridgman, 1883)
- Acrolyta xylonomoides (Morley, 1907)
- Acropimpla didyma (Gravenhorst, 1829)
- Acroricnus stylator (Thunberg, 1822)
- Acrotomus lucidulus (Gravenhorst, 1829)
- Acrotomus succinctus (Gravenhorst, 1829)
- Adelognathus brevicornis Holmgren, 1855
- Adelognathus britannicus Perkins, 1943
- Adelognathus chrysopygus (Gravenhorst, 1829)
- Adelognathus dorsalis (Gravenhorst, 1829)
- Adelognathus fasciatus Thomson, 1883
- Adelognathus granulatus Perkins, 1943
- Adelognathus laevicollis Thomson, 1883
- Adelognathus nigriceps Thomson, 1888
- Adelognathus nigricornis Thomson, 1888
- Adelognathus nigrifrons Holmgren, 1855
- Adelognathus pallipes (Gravenhorst, 1829)
- Adelognathus pilosus Thomson, 1888
- Adelognathus pusillus Holmgren, 1855
- Adelognathus stelfoxi Fitton, Gauld & Shaw, 1982
- Adelognathus thomsoni Schmiedeknecht, 1911
- Aethecerus discolor Wesmael, 1844
- Aethecerus dispar Wesmael, 1844
- Aethecerus longulus Wesmael, 1844
- Aethecerus nitidus Wesmael, 1844
- Aethecerus placidus Wesmael, 1844
- Afrephialtes cicatricosa (Gravenhorst, 1829)
- Agasthenes varitarsus (Gravenhorst, 1829)
- Agriotypus armatus Curtis, 1832
- Agrothereutes abbreviator (Fabricius, 1793)
- Agrothereutes adustus (Gravenhorst, 1829)
- Agrothereutes amoenus (Gravenhorst, 1829)
- Agrothereutes aterrimus (Gravenhorst, 1829)
- Agrothereutes batavus Vollenhoven, 1873
- Agrothereutes brevipenms (Marshall, 1867)
- Agrothereutes fumipennis (Gravenhorst, 1829)
- Agrothereutes grossus (Gravenhorst, 1829)
- Agrothereutes hospes (Tschek, 1870)
- Agrothereutes mandator (Linnaeus, 1758)
- Agrothereutes saturniae (Boie, 1855)
- Agrothereutes tibialis (Thomson, 1873)
- Agrothereutes tricolor (Gravenhorst, 1829)
- Agrypon anomalas (Gravenhorst, 1829)
- Agrypon anxium (Wesmael, 1849)
- Agrypon brevicolle (Wesmael, 1849)
- Agrypon clandestinum (Gravenhorst, 1829)
- Agrypon delarvatum (Gravenhorst, 1829)
- Agrypon flaveolatum (Gravenhorst, 1807)
- Agrypon flexorium (Thunberg, 1822)
- Agrypon gracilipes (Curtis, 1839)
- Agrypon varitarsum (Wesmael, 1849)
- Alexeter attenuatus (Bridgman, 1888)
- Alexeter erythrocerus (Gravenhorst, 1829)
- Alexeter fallax (Holmgren, 1855)
- Alexeter gracihpes (Curtis, 1837)
- Alexeter multicolor (Gravenhorst, 1829)
- Alexeter nebulator (Thunberg, 1822)
- Alexeter niger (Gravenhorst, 1829)
- Alexeter rapinator (Gravenhorst, 1829)
- Alexeter sectator (Thunberg, 1822)
- Alexeter testaceator (Thunberg, 1822)
- Allophroides boops (Gravenhorst, 1829)
- Alloplasta piceator (Thunberg, 1822)
- Alloplasta plantaria (Gravenhorst, 1829)
- Alomya debellator (Fabricius, 1775)
- Alomya semifiava Stephens, 1835
- Amblyjoppa fuscipennis (Wesmael, 1844)
- Amblyjoppa proteus (Christ, 1791)
- Amblyteles armatorius (Forster, 1771)
- Aneuclis melanarius (Holmgren, 1860)
- Aniseres lubricus Förster, 1871
- Anisobas cingulatorius (Gravenhorst, 1820)
- Anisobas platystylus Thomson, 1888
- Anomalon foliator (Fabricius, 1798)
- Aoplus altercator (Wesmael, 1855)
- Aoplus castaneus Gravenhorst, 1820)
- Aoplus defraudator (Wesmael, 1844)
- Aoplus humilis (Wesmael, 1857)
- Aoplus lariciatae (Kriechbaumer, 1890)
- Aoplus ochropis (Gmelin in Linnaeus, 1790)
- Aoplus ratzeburgii (Hartig, 1838)
- Aoplus rubricosus (Holmgren, 1864)
- Aoplus ruficeps (Gravenhorst, 1829)
- Aoplus virginalis (Wesmael, 1844)
- Apaeleticus bellicosus Wesmael, 1844
- Apaeleticus inimicus (Gravenhorst, 1820)
- Apechthis compunctor (Linnaeus, 1758)
- Apechthis quadridentatus (Thomson, 1877)
- Apechthis rufatus (Gmelin in Linnaeus, 1790)
- Aperileptus albipalpus (Gravenhorst, 1829)
- Aperileptus inamoenus Förster, 1871
- Aphanistes bellicosus (Wesmael, 1849)
- Aphanistes ruficornis (Gravenhorst, 1829)
- Aphanistes xanthopus (Schrank, 1781)
- Apophua bipunctoria (Thunberg, 1822)
- Apophua cicatricosa (Ratzeburg, 1848)
- Apophua evanescens (Ratzeburg, 1848)
- Apophua genalis (Müller, 1883)
- Apsilops aquaticus (Thomson, 1874)
- Apsilops cinctorius (Fabricius, 1775)
- Aptesis abdominator (Gravenhorst, 1829)
- Aptesis albulatoria (Gravenhorst, 1829)
- Aptesis assimilis (Gravenhorst, 1829)
- Aptesis bifrons (Gmelin in Linnaeus, 1790)
- Aptesis cretata (Gravenhorst, 1829)
- Aptesis femoralls (Qrhomson, 1883)
- Aptesis fiagitator (Rossius, 1794)
- Aptesis funerea (Schmiedeknecht, 1905)
- Aptesis gracilicornis (Kriechbaumer, 1891)
- Aptesis graviceps Marshall, 1868
- Aptesis hopei (Desvignes, 1856)
- Aptesis improba (Gravenhorst, 1829)
- Aptesis labralis (Gravenhorst, 1829)
- Aptesis leucosticta (Gravenhorst, 1829)
- Aptesis nigritula (Thomson, 1885)
- Aptesis nigrocincta (Gravenhorst, 1829)
- Aptesis scotica (Marshall, 1868)
- Aptesis sericans (Gravenhorst, 1829)
- Aptesis subguttata (Gravenhorst, 1829)
- Aptesis terminata (Gravenhorst, 1829)
- Aptesis tricincta (Gravenhorst, 1829)
- Aptesis unifasciata (Schmiedeknecht, 1905)
- Arbelus athallaeperdus (Curtis, 1860)
- Arenetra pilosella (Gravenhorst, 1829)
- Aritranis bellosa (Curtis, 1837)
- Aritranis confector (Gravenhorst, 1829)
- Aritranis dubia (Taschenberg, 1865)
- Aritranis fugitiva (Gravenhorst, 1829)
- Aritranis nigripes (Gravenhorst, 1829)
- Aritranis occisor (Gravenhorst, 1829)
- Aritranis quadriguttata (Gravenhorst, 1829)
- Aritranis rufoniger (Desvignes, 1856)
- Aritranis subcincta (Gravenhorst, 1829)
- Arotes albicinctus Gravenhorst, 1829
- Arotrephes speculator (Gravenhorst, 1829)
- Asthenolabus latiscapus (Thomson, 1894)
- Asthenolabus vitratorius (Gravenhorst, 1829)
- Astiphromma dorsale (Holmgren, 1860)
- Astiphromma graniger (Thomson, 1886)
- Astiphromma hamulum (Thomson, 1886)
- Astiphromma mandibulare (Thomson, 1886)
- Astiphromma pictum (Brischke, 1880)
- Astiphromma plagiatum (Thomson, 1886)
- Astiphromma scutellatum (Gravenhorst, 1829)
- Astiphromma sericans (Curtis, 1833)
- Astiphromma splenium (Curtis, 1833)
- Astiphromma strenuum (Holmgren, 1860)
- Astiphromma tenuicorne (Thomson, 1886)
- Atractodes ambigaus Ruthe, 1859
- Atractodes angustipennis Förster, 1876
- Atractodes arator Haliday, 1838
- Atractodes bicolor Gravenhorst, 1829
- Atractodes breviscapus Thomson, 1884
- Atractodes compressus Thomson, 1884
- Atractodes croceicornis Haliday, 1838
- Atractodes cultellator Haliday, 1838
- Atractodes discoloripes Förster, 1876
- Atractodes exilis Haliday, 1838
- Atractodes foveolatus Gravenhorst, 1829
- Atractodes gilvipes Holmgren, 1860
- Atractodes gravidus Gravenhorst, 1829
- Atractodes nigripes Förster, 1876
- Atractodes oreophilus Förster, 1876
- Atractodes picipes Holmgren, 1860
- Atractodes pusillus Förster, 1876
- Atractodes tenuipes Thomson
- Atractodes vestalls Haliday, 1838
- Atrometus insignis Förster, 1878
- Azelus erythropalpus (Gmelin in Linnaeus, 1790)

=== B ===
- Banchus compressus (Fabricius, 1787) preocc.
- Banchus crefeldensis Ulbricht, 1916
- Banchus falcatorius (Fabricius, 1775)
- Banchus hastator (Fabricius, 1793)
- Banchus monileatus Gravenhorst, 1829
- Banchus pictus Fabricius, 1798
- Banchus volutatorius (Linnaeus, 1758)
- Barichneumon albilineatus (Gravenhorst, 1820)
- Barichneumon albosignatus (Gravenhorst, 1829)
- Barichneumon anator (Fabricius, 1793)
- Barichneumon basalls Perkins, 1960
- Barichneumon bilunulatus (Gravenhorst, 1829)
- Barichneumon bimaculatus (Schrank, 1776)
- Barichneumon calilcerus (Gravenhorst, 1820)
- Barichneumon chionomus (Wesmael, 1844)
- Barichneumon deceptor (Scopoli, 1763)
- Barichneumon derogator (Wesmael, 1844)
- Barichneumon digrammus (Gravenhorst, 1820)
- Barichneumon dumeticola (Gravenhorst, 1829)
- Barichneumon faunus (Gravenhorst, 1829)
- Barichneumon gemellus (Gravenhorst, 1829)
- Barichneumon heracilana (Bridgman, 1884)
- Barichneumon lepidus (Gravenhorst, 1829)
- Barichneumon macuilcauda Perkins, 1953
- Barichneumon monostagon (Gravenhorst, 1820)
- Barichneumon peregrinator (Linnaeus, 1758)
- Barichneumon plagiarius (Wesmael, 1848)
- Barichneumon praeceptor (Thunberg, 1822)
- Barichneumon ridibundus (Gravenhorst, 1829)
- Barichneumon sanguinator (Rossius, 1794)
- Barichneumon tergenus (Gravenhorst, 1820)
- Barycnemis bellator (Müller, 1776)
- Barycnemis dissimilis (Gravenhorst, 1829)
- Barycnemis exhaustator (Fabricius, 1798)
- Barycnemis gravipes (Gravenhorst, 1829)
- Barycnemis guttulator (Thunberg, 1822)
- Barycnemis harpurus (Schrank, 1802)
- Barylypa delictor (Thunberg, 1822)
- Barylypa insidiator (Förster, 1878)
- Barylypa uniguttata (Gravenhorst, 1829)
- Barytarbes colon (Gravenhorst, 1829)
- Barytarbes flavoscutellatus (Thomson, 1892)
- Barytarbes laeviusculus (Thomson, 1883)
- Barytarbes segmentarius (Fabricius, 1787)
- Barytarbes sp. Förster, 1868
- Bathyplectes anura (Thomson, 1887)
- Bathyplectes exiguus (Gravenhorst, 1829)
- Bathyplectes immolator (Gravenhorst, 1829)
- Bathyplectes rostratus (Thomson, 1887)
- Bathyplectes tristis (Gravenhorst, 1829)
- Bathythrix aereus (Gravenhorst, 1829)
- Bathythrix alter (Kerrich, 1942)
- Bathythrix argentatus (Gravenhorst, 1829)
- Bathythrix bellulus (Kriechbaumer, 1892)
- Bathythrix brevis (Thomson, 1884)
- Bathythrix claviger (Taschenberg, 1865)
- Bathythrix collaris (Thomson, 1896)
- Bathythrix fragilis (Gravenhorst, 1829)
- Bathythrix lacustris (Schmiedeknecht, 1905)
- Bathythrix lamiinus (Thomson, 1884)
- Bathythrix linearis (Gravenhorst, 1829)
- Bathythrix pellucidator (Gravenhorst, 1829)
- Bathythrix ruficaudatus (Bridgman, 1883)
- Bathythrix tenerrimus (Gravenhorst, 1829)
- Bathythrix tenuis (Gravenhorst, 1829)
- Bathythrix thomsoni (Kerrich, 1942)
- Bioblapsis polita (Vollenhoven, 1878)
- Blapticus dentifer Thomson, 1888
- Blapticus leucostomus Förster, 1871
- Buathra laborator (Thunberg, 1822)
- Buathra tarsoleuca (Schrank, 1781)

=== C ===
- Caenocryptus rufiventris (Gravenhorst, 1829)
- Caenocryptus striolatus Thomson, 1896
- Callajoppa cirrogastra (Schrank, 1781)
- Callajoppa exaltatoria (Panzer, 1804)
- Campocraspedon arcanus (Stelfox, 1941)
- Campocraspedon caudatus (Thomson, 1890)
- Campodorus amictus (Holmgren, 1855)
- Campodorus astutus (Holmgren, 1876)
- Campodorus axillaris (Stephens, 1835)
- Campodorus cailgatus (Gravenhorst, 1829)
- Campodorus corrugatus (Holmgren, 1876)
- Campodorus dorsalis (Gravenhorst, 1829)
- Campodorus formosus (Gravenhorst, 1829)
- Campodorus fuscipes (Holmgren, 1855)
- Campodorus haematodes (Gravenhorst, 1829)
- Campodorus hamulus (Gravenhorst, 1829)
- Campodorus hosternus (Thomson, 1894)
- Campodorus ignavus (Holmgren, 1855)
- Campodorus incidens (Thomson, 1894)
- Campodorus luctuosus (Holmgren, 1855)
- Campodorus macuilcollis (Stephens, 1835)
- Campodorus mixtus (Holmgren, 1855)
- Campodorus molestus (Holmgren, 1855)
- Campodorus nigridens (Thomson, 1894)
- Campodorus patagiatus (Holmgren, 1876)
- Campodorus peronatus (Marshall, 1876)
- Campodorus pictipes (Habermehl, 1923)
- Campodorus scapularis (Stephens, 1835)
- Campodorus tristis (Holmgren, 1855)
- Campodorus trochanteratus (Kriechbaumer, 1896)
- Campodorus viduus (Holmgren, 1855)
- Campoletis agilis (Holmgren, 1860)
- Campoletis alienus (Brischke, 1880)
- Campoletis annulatus (Gravenhorst, 1829)
- Campoletis boops (Thomson, 1887)
- Campoletis braccatus (Gmelin in Linnaeus, 1790)
- Campoletis caedator (Gravenhorst, 1829)
- Campoletis clausus (Brischke, 1880)
- Campoletis cognatus (Tschek, 1871)
- Campoletis coxalis (Brischke, 1880)
- Campoletis crassicornis (Tschek, 1871)
- Campoletis dilatator (Thunberg, 1822)
- Campoletis erythropus (Thomson, 1887)
- Campoletis farciatus (Bridgman, 1888)
- Campoletis femoralis (Gravenhorst, 1829)
- Campoletis fuscipes (Holmgren, 1855)
- Campoletis holmgreni (Tschek, 1871)
- Campoletis incisus (Bridgman, 1883)
- Campoletis inquinatus (Holmgren, 1860)
- Campoletis latrator Gravenhorst, 1829 misident.
- Campoletis longulus (Thomson, 1887)
- Campoletis posticus (Bridgman & Fitch, 1885)
- Campoletis punctatus (Bridgman, 1886)
- Campoletis rapax (Gravenhorst, 1829)
- Campoletis raptor (Zetterstedt, 1838)
- Campoletis thuringiacus (Schmiedeknecht, 1909)
- Campoletis tricinctus (Gravenhorst, 1829)
- Campoletis varicoxa (Thomson, 1887)
- Campoletis vexans (Holmgren, 1860)
- Campoletis viennensis (Gravenhorst, 1829)
- Campoletis zonatus (Gravenhorst, 1829)
- Campoplex abbreviatus (Brischke, 1880)
- Campoplex angulatus (Thomson, 1887)
- Campoplex borealis (Zetterstedt, 1838)
- Campoplex cingulatus (Brischke, 1880)
- Campoplex continuus (Thomson, 1887)
- Campoplex coracinus (Thomson, 1887)
- Campoplex cursitans (Holmgren, 1860)
- Campoplex difformis (Gmelin in Linnaeus, 1790)
- Campoplex ensator Gravenhorst, 1829
- Campoplex fusciplica (Thomson, 1887)
- Campoplex hadrocerus (Thomson, 1887)
- Campoplex infernalis (Gravenhorst, 1820)
- Campoplex lugubrinus (Holmgren, 1855)
- Campoplex melanostictus Gravenhorst, 1829
- Campoplex multicinctus Gravenhorst, 1829
- Campoplex mutabilis (Holmgren, 1860)
- Campoplex ovatus (Brischke, 1880)
- Campoplex procerus (Brischke, 1880)
- Campoplex psammae (Morley, 1915)
- Campoplex rothii (Holmgren, 1855)
- Campoplex ruficoxa (Thomson, 1887)
- Campoplex striolatus (Thomson, 1887)
- Campoplex tumidulus Gravenhorst, 1829
- Campoplex unkingulatus (Schmiedeknecht, 1909)
- Campoplex variabilis (Bridgman, 1886)
- Carria paradoxa Schmiedeknecht, 1924
- Casinaria affinis Tschek, 1871
- Casinaria albipalpis (Gravenhorst, 1829)
- Casinaria ischnogaster Thomson, 1887
- Casinaria morionella Holmgren, 1860
- Casinaria orbitalis (Gravenhorst, 1829)
- Casinaria palhpes Brischke, 1880
- Casinaria petiolaris (Gravenhorst, 1829)
- Casinaria rufimanus (Gravenhorst, 1829)
- Casinaria tenuiventris (Gravenhorst, 1829)
- Casinaria vidua (Gravenhorst, 1829)
- Catalytus fulveolatus (Gravenhorst, 1829)
- Catalytus mangeri (Gravenhorst, 1829)
- Catastenus fimoralis Förster, 1871
- Centeterus confector (Gravenhorst, 1829)
- Centeterus opprimator (Gravenhorst, 1820)
- Charitopes brunneus (Morley, 1907)
- Charitopes carri (Roman, 1923)
- Charitopes chrysopae (Brischke, 1890)
- Charitopes cynipinus (Thomson, 1884)
- Charitopes melanogaster (Thomson, 1884)
- Charitopes nitidus (Bridgman, 1889)
- Charops cantator (Degeer, 1778)
- Chasmias motatorius (Fabricius, 1775)
- Chasmias paludator (Desvignes, 1854)
- Chorinaeus brevicalcar Thomson, 1887
- Chorinaeus cristator (Gravenhorst, 1829)
- Chorinaeus fiavipes Bridgman, 1881
- Chorinaeus funebris (Gravenhorst, 1829)
- Chorinaeus hastianae Aeschlimann, 1975
- Chorinaeus longicalcar Thomson, 1887
- Chorinaeus longicornis Thomson, 1887
- Chorinaeus talpa (Haliday, 1838)
- Chorinaeus xanthopsis (Townes, 1946)
- Cidaphus alarius (Gravenhorst, 1829)
- Cidaphus atricillus (Haliday, 1838)
- Cidaphus brischkei (Szapligeti, 1911)
- Cladeutes discedens (Woldstedt, 1872)
- Clistopyga incitator (Fabricius, 1793)
- Clistopyga rufator Holmgren, 1856
- Clistopyga sauberi Brauns, 1898
- Coelichneumon billneatus (Gmelin in Linnaeus, 1790)
- Coelichneumon comitator (Linnaeus, 1758)
- Coelichneumon consimills (Wesmael, 1844)
- Coelichneumon cyaniventris (Wesmael, 1859)
- Coelichneumon deliratorius (Linnaeus, 1758)
- Coelichneumon desinatorius (Thunberg, 1822)
- Coelichneumon eximius (Stephens, 1835)
- Coelichneumon fairificus (Wesmael, 1844)
- Coelichneumon fasciatus (Gmelin in Linnaeus, 1790)
- Coelichneumon haemorrhoidalls (Gravenhorst, 1820)
- Coelichneumon leucocerus (Gravenhorst, 1820)
- Coelichneumon microstictus (Gravenhorst, 1829)
- Coelichneumon nigerrimus (Stephens, 1835)
- Coelichneumon nigricornis (Wesmael, 1844)
- Charitopes wesmaeliicidus (Roman, 1934)
- Coelichneumon orbitator (Thunberg, 1822)
- Coelichneumon purpurissatus Perkins, 1953
- Coelichneumon ruficauda (Wesmael, 1844)
- Coelichneumon serenus (Gravenhorst, 1820)
- Coelichneumon solutus (Holmgren, 1864)
- Coelichneumon truncatulus (Thomson, 1886)
- Coleocentrus croceicornis (Gravenhorst, 1829)
- Coleocentrus excitator (Poda, 1761)
- Collyria coxator (Villers, 1789)
- Collyria trichophthalma (Thomson, 1877)
- Colocnema rufina (Gravenhorst, 1829)
- Colpognathus celerator (Gravenhorst, 1807)
- Colpognathus divisus Thomson, 1891
- Colpotrochia cincta (Scopoli, 1763)
- Cosmoconus ceratophorus (Thomson, 1888)
- Cosmoconus elongator (Fabricius, 1775)
- Cosmoconus meridionator
- Cotiheresiarches dirus (Wesmael, 1853)
- Cratichneumon albifrons (Stephens, 1835)
- Cratichneumon clarigator (Wesmael, 1844)
- Cratichneumon coruscator (Linnaeus, 1758)
- Cratichneumon culex (Müller, 1776)
- Cratichneumon fabricator (Fabricius, 1793)
- Cratichneumon foersteri (Wesmael, 1848)
- Cratichneumon fugitivus (Gravenhorst, 1829)
- Cratichneumon infidus (Wesmael, 1848)
- Cratichneumon jocularis (Wesmael, 1848)
- Cratichneumon luteiventris (Gravenhorst, 1820)
- Cratichneumon magus (Wesmael, 1855)
- Cratichneumon pseudocryptus (Wesmael, 1857)
- Cratichneumon rufifrons (Gravenhorst, 1829)
- Cratichneumon semirufus (Gravenhorst, 1820)
- Cratichneumon sicarius (Gravenhorst, 1829)
- Cratichneumon varipes (Gravenhorst, 1829)
- Cratichneumon versator (Thunberg, 1822)
- Cratichneumon viator (Scopoli, 1763)
- Cratocryptus furcator (Gravenhorst, 1829)
- Cremastus bellicosus Gravenhorst, 1829
- Cremastus buoliana (Curtis, 1854)
- Cremastus cephalotes Sedivy, 1970
- Cremastus crassicornis Thomson, 1890
- Cremastus decorata (Gravenhorst, 1829)
- Cremastus geminus Gravenhorst, 1829
- Cremastus infirmus Gravenhorst, 1829
- Cremastus interruptor (Gravenhorst, 1829)
- Cremastus kratochvili Sedivy, 1970
- Cremastus pungens Gravenhorst, 1829
- Cremastus spectator Gravenhorst, 1829
- Cremastus subnasuta (Thomson, 1890)
- Cremnodes atricapillus (Gravenhorst, 1815)
- Cremnodes riffipes (Perkins, 1962)
- Crypteffigies albilarvatus (Gravenhorst, 1820)
- Crypteffigies lanius (Gravenhorst, 1829)
- Cryptopimpla anomala (Holmgren, 1860)
- Cryptopimpla arvicola (Gravenhorst, 1829)
- Cryptopimpla cailgata (Gravenhorst, 1829)
- Cryptopimpla calceolata (Gravenhorst, 1829)
- Cryptopimpla errabunda (Gravenhorst, 1829)
- Cryptopimpla quadrilineata (Gravenhorst, 1829)
- Ctenichneumon castigator (Fabricius, 1793)
- Ctenichneumon celenae Perkins, 1953
- Ctenichneumon devylderi (Holmgren, 1871)
- Ctenichneumon divisorius (Gravenhorst, 1820)
- Ctenichneumon edictorius (Linnaeus, 1758)
- Ctenichneumon funereus (Geoffroy in Fourcroy, 1785)
- Ctenichneumon inspector (Wesmael, 1844)
- Ctenichneumon messorius (Gravenhorst, 1820)
- Ctenichneumon nitens (Christ, 1791)
- Ctenichneumon occisorius (Fabricius, 1793)
- Ctenichneumon panzeri (Wesmael, 1844)
- Ctenichneumon rubroater (Ratzeburg, 1852)
- Ctenichneumon stagnicola (Thomson, 1888)
- Cteniscus nigrifrons (Thomson, 1883)
- Cteniscus pedatorius (Panzer, 1809)
- Cteniscus scalaris (Gravenhorst, 1829)
- Ctenochira aberrans (Ruthe, 1855)
- Ctenochira angulata (Thomson, 1883)
- Ctenochira angustata (Roman, 1909)
- Ctenochira arcuata (Holmgren, 1855)
- Ctenochira gilvipes (Holmgren, 1855)
- Ctenochira haemosterna (Haliday, 1838)
- Ctenochira marginata (Holmgren, 1855)
- Ctenochira obscura (Stephens, 1835)
- Ctenochira pastoralls (Gravenhorst, 1829)
- Ctenochira pratensis (Gravenhorst, 1829)
- Ctenochira propinqua (Gravenhorst, 1829)
- Ctenochira pygobarba (Roman, 1937)
- Ctenochira rufipes (Gravenhorst, 1829)
- Ctenochira sanguinatoria (Ratzeburg, 1852)
- Ctenochira sphaerocephala (Gravenhorst, 1829)
- Ctenochira subrufa (Bridgman, 1888)
- Ctenochira xanthopyga (Holmgren, 1855)
- Ctenopelma lucifer (Gravenhorst, 1829)
- Ctenopelma nigrum Holmgren, 1855
- Ctenopelma tomentosum (Desvignes, 1856)
- Ctenopelma xanthostigmum Holmgren, 1855
- Cubocephalus anatorius (Gravenhorst, 1829)
- Cubocephalus associator (Thunberg, 1822)
- Cubocephalus brevicornis (Taschenberg, 1865)
- Cubocephalus distinctor (Thunberg, 1822)
- Cubocephalus erytlirinus (Gravenhorst, 1829)
- Cubocephalus femoralis (Thomson, 1873)
- Cubocephalus lacteator (Gravenhorst, 1829) ?misident.
- Cubocephalus nigripes (Strobl, 1901)
- Cubocephalus nigriventris (Thomson, 1874)
- Cubocephalus stomaticus (Gravenhorst, 1829)
- Cubocephalus subpetiolatus (Gravenhorst, 1829)
- Cycasis rubiginosa (Gravenhorst, 1829)
- Cyclolabus dubiosus Perkins, 1953
- Cyclolabus nigricollis (Wesmael, 1844)
- Cyclolabus pactor (Wesmael, 1844)
- Cyllocerla accusator (Fabricius, 1793)
- Cyllocerla caligata (Gravenhorst, 1829)
- Cyllocerla marginator Schiødte, 1839
- Cyllocerla melancholica (Gravenhorst, 1820)
- Cymodusa antennator (Holmgren, 1855)
- Cymodusa cruentata (Gravenhorst, 1829)
- Cymodusa exilis Holmgren, 1860
- Cymodusa flavjpes Brischke, 1880
- Cymodusa fusciata (Bridgman & Fitch, 1885)
- Cymodusa leucocera Holmgren, 1859

=== D ===
- Delomerista laevis (Gravenhorst, 1829)
- Delomerista mandibularis (Gravenhorst, 1829)
- Delomerista novita (Cresson, 1870)
- Delomerista pfankuchi (Brauns, 1905)
- Demopheles corruptor (Taschenberg, 1865)
- Deuteroxorides albitarsus (Gravenhorst, 1829)
- Deuteroxorides elevator (Panzer, 1799)
- Diacritus aciculatus (Vollenhoven, 1878)
- Diadegma aculeata (Bridgman, 1889)
- Diadegma agilis (Brischke, 1880)
- Diadegma annulicrus (Thomson, 1887)
- Diadegma annulipes (Bridgman, 1889)
- Diadegma armillata (Gravenhorst, 1829)
- Diadegma chrysostictos (Gmelin in Linnaeus, 1790)
- Diadegma clavicornis (Brischke, 1880)
- Diadegma coleophorarum (Ratzeburg, 1852)
- Diadegma combinata (Holmgren, 1860)
- Diadegma consumtor (Gravenhorst, 1829)
- Diadegma crassa (Bridgman, 1889)
- Diadegma elishae (Bridgman, 1884)
- Diadegma erucator (Zetterstedt, 1838)
- Diadegma eucerophaga Horstmann, 1969
- Diadegma finestralis (Holmgren, 1860)
- Diadegma gracilis (Gravenhorst, 1829)
- Diadegma holopyga (Thomson, 1887)
- Diadegma insectator (Schrank, 1781)
- Diadegma interrupta (Holmgren, 1860)
- Diadegma lateralis (Gravenhorst, 1829)
- Diadegma latungula (Thomson, 1887)
- Diadegma majalis (Gravenhorst, 1829)
- Diadegma melania (Thomson, 1887)
- Diadegma nana (Gravenhorst, 1829)
- Diadegma neocerophaga Horstmann, 1969
- Diadegma parvicaudo (Thomson, 1887)
- Diadegma pusio (Holmgren, 1860)
- Diadegma rufata (Bridgman, 1884)
- Diadegma scotiae (Bridgman, 1889)
- Diadegma sordipes (Thomson, 1887)
- Diadegma tenuipes (Thomson, 1887)
- Diadegma tripunctata (Bridgman, 1886)
- Diadegma trochanterata (Thomson, 1887)
- Diadegma truncata (Thomson, 1887)
- Diadegma varians (Brischke, 1880)
- Diadromus albinotatus (Gravenhorst, 1829)
- Diadromus candidatus (Gravenhorst, 1829)
- Diadromus collaris (Gravenhorst, 1829)
- Diadromus quadriguttatus (Gravenhorst, 1829)
- Diadromus subtilicornis (Gravenhorst, 1829)
- Diadromus tenax Wesmael, 1844
- Diadromus troglodytes (Gravenhorst, 1829)
- Diadromus varicolor Wesmael, 1844
- Diaglyptellana opacula (Thomson, 1884)
- Diaglyptidea conformis (Gmelin in Linnaeus, 1790)
- Diaglyptidea pallicarpus (Thomson, 1884)
- Dialipsis communis (Förster, 1871)
- Diaparsis carinifer (Thomson, 1889)
- Diaparsis multiplicator Aubert, 1969
- Diaparsis nutritor (Fabricius, 1804)
- Diaparsis stramineipes (Brischke, 1880)
- Dicaelotus cameroni Bridgman, 1881
- Dicaelotus erythrostomus Wesmael, 1844
- Dicaelotus fitchi Perkins, 1953
- Dicaelotus inflexus Thomson, 1891
- Dicaelotus morosus Wesmael, 1855
- Dicaelotus orbitalis Thomson, 1891
- Dicaelotus parvulus (Gravenhorst, 1829)
- Dicaelotus pictus (Schmiedeknecht, 1903)
- Dicaelotus pudibundus (Wesmael, 1844)
- Dicaelotus pumilus (Gravenhorst, 1829)
- Dicaelotus punctiventris (Thomson, 1891)
- Dicaelotus ruficoxatus (Gravenhorst, 1829)
- Dicaelotus rufoniger Berthoumieu, 1896
- Dicaelotus suspectus Perkins, 1953
- Dichrogaster aestivalls (Gravenhorst, 1829)
- Dichrogaster liostylus (Thomson, 1885)
- Dimophora robusta Brischke, 1880
- Diphyus castanopyga (Stephens, 1835)
- Diphyus gradatorius (Thunberg, 1822)
- Diphyus indocills (Wesmael, 1844)
- Diphyus longigena (Thomson, 1888)
- Diphyus luctatorius (Linnaeus, 1758)
- Diphyus margineguttatus (Gravenhorst, 1829)
- Diphyus mercatorius (Fabricius, 1793)
- Diphyus monitorius (Panzer, 1801)
- Diphyus palliatorius (Gravenhorst, 1829)
- Diphyus quadripunctorius (Müller, 1776)
- Diphyus raptorius (Linnaeus, 1758)
- Diphyus septemguttatus (Gravenhorst 1829)
- Diphyus trifasciatus (Gravenhorst, 1829)
- Diplazon alpinus (Holmgren, 1856)
- Diplazon annulatus (Gravenhorst, 1829)
- Diplazon deletus (Thomson, 1890)
- Diplazon laetatorius (Fabricius, 1781)
- Diplazon neoalpinus Zwakhals, 1979
- Diplazon pectoratorius (Gravenhorst, 1829)
- Diplazon scutatorius Teunissen, 1943
- Diplazon tetragonus (Thunberg, 1822)
- Diplazon tibiatorius (Thunberg, 1822)
- Diplazon varicoxa (Thomson, 1890)
- Dirophanes fulvitarsis (Wesmael, 1844)
- Dirophanes rusticatus (Wesmael, 1844)
- Dolichomitus agnoscendus (Roman, 1939)
- Dolichomitus diversicostae (Perkins, 1943)
- Dolichomitus imperator (Kriechbaumer, 1854)
- Dolichomitus mesocentrus (Gravenhorst, 1829)
- Dolichomitus messor (Gravenhorst, 1829)
- Dolichomitus populneus (Ratzeburg, 1848)
- Dolichomitus pterelas (Say, 1829)
- Dolichomitus strobilellae (Linnaeus, 1758)
- Dolichomitus terebrans (Ratzeburg, 1844)
- Dolichomitus tuberculatus (Geoffroy in Fourcroy, 1785)
- Dolophron pedellus (Holmgren, 1860)
- Dreisbachia pictifrons (Thomson, 1877)
- Dusona anceps (Holmgren, 1860)
- Dusona angustata (Thomson, 1887)
- Dusona angustifrons (Förster, 1868)
- Dusona annexa (Förster, 1868)
- Dusona aversa (Förster, 1868)
- Dusona bucculenta (Holmgren, 1860)
- Dusona carinifrons (Holmgren, 1860)
- Dusona confusa (Förster, 1868)
- Dusona contumax (Förster, 1868)
- Dusona cultrator (Gravenhorst, 1829)
- Dusona erythrogaster (Förster, 1868)
- Dusona falcator (Fabricius, 1775)
- Dusona foersteri (Roman, 1942)
- Dusona incompleta (Bridgman, 1889)
- Dusona infesta (Förster, 1868)
- Dusona insignia (Förster, 1868)
- Dusona lapponica (Holmgren, 1860)
- Dusona latungula (Thomson, 1887)
- Dusona leptogaster (Holmgren, 1860)
- Dusona myrtilla (Desvignes, 1856)
- Dusona nidulator (Fabricius, 1804)
- Dusona notabilis (Förster, 1868)
- Dusona opaca (Thomson, 1887)
- Dusona oxyacanthae (Boie, 1855)
- Dusona petiolator (Fabricius, 1804)
- Dusona pugillator (Linnaeus, 1758)
- Dusona remota (Förster, 1868)
- Dusona rugifer (Förster, 1868)
- Dusona rugulosa (Förster, 1868)
- Dusona sobolicida (Förster, 1868)
- Dusona stragifex (Förster, 1868)
- Dusona subaequalis (Förster, 1868)
- Dusona tenuis (Förster, 1868)
- Dusona unicincta (Holmgren, 1872)
- Dusona victor (Thunberg, 1822)
- Dusona vigilator (Förster, 1868)
- Dusona xenocampta (Förster, 1868)
- Dusona zonella (Förster, 1868)
- Dyspetes arrogator Heinrich, 1949

=== E ===
- Echthrus reluctator (Linnaeus, 1758)
- Eclytus exornatus (Gravenhorst, 1829)
- Eclytus multicolor (Kreichbaumer, 1896)
- Eclytus ornatus Holmgren, 1855
- Ectopius rubellus (Gmelin in Linnaeus, 1790)
- Enclisis macilentus (Gravenhorst, 1829)
- Encrateola mediovittata (Schmiedeknecht, 1897)
- Endasys brevis (Gravenhorst, 1829)
- Endasys erythrogaster (Gravenhorst, 1829)
- Endasys parviventris (Gravenhorst, 1829)
- Endasys transverseareolatus (Strobl, 1901)
- Endromopoda arundinator (Fabricius, 1804)
- Endromopoda detrita (Holmgren, 1860)
- Endromopoda nigricoxis (Ulbricht, 1910)
- Endromopoda nitida (Brauns, 1898)
- Endromopoda phragmitidis (Perkins, 1957)
- Enicospilus combustus (Gravenhorst, 1829)
- Enicospilus inflexus (Ratzeburg, 1844)
- Enicospilus ramidulus (Linnaeus, 1758)
- Enicospilus repentinus (Holmgren, 1860)
- Enicospilus undulatus (Gravenhorst, 1829)
- Enizemum nigricorne (Thomson, 1890)
- Enizemum ornatum (Gravenhorst, 1829)
- Entypoma robustum Förster, 1871
- Entypoma suspiciosum (Förster, 1871)
- Enytus apostatus (Gravenhorst, 1829)
- Enytus neapostatus (Horstmann, 1969)
- Eparces grandiceps Thomson, 1891
- Ephialtes manifestator (Linnaeus, 1758)
- Epitomus parvus Thomson, 1891
- Epitomus proximus Perkins, 1953
- Eremotylus marginatus (Jurine, 1807)
- Eriborus dorsalis (Gravenhorst, 1829)
- Eridolius alacer (Gravenhorst, 1829)
- Eridolius aurifluus (Haliday, 1838)
- Eridolius basalis (Stephens, 1835)
- Eridolius bimaculatus (Holmgren, 1855)
- Eridolius consobrinus (Holmgren, 1855)
- Eridolius curtisii (Haliday, 1838)
- Eridolius elegans (Stephens, 1835)
- Eridolius flavomaculatus (Gravenhorst, 1829)
- Eridolius gnathoxanthus (Gravenhorst, 1829)
- Eridolius hofferi (Gregor, 1937)
- Eridolius hostilis (Holmgren, 1855)
- Eridolius limbatellus (Holmgren, 1855)
- Eridolius lineolus (Stephens, 1835)
- Eridolius marginatus (Thomson, 1883)
- Eridolius mitigosus (Gravenhorst, 1829)
- Eridolius pachysomus (Stephens, 1835)
- Eridolius pictus (Gravenhorst, 1829)
- Eridolius praeustus (Holmgren, 1855)
- Eridolius romani (Kerrich, 1952)
- Eridolius rufilabris (Holmgren, 1855)
- Eridolius rufonotatus (Holmgren, 1855)
- Eridolius ustulatus (Holmgren, 1855)
- Eriplatys ardeicollis (Wesmael, 1844)
- Eristicus clericus (Gravenhorst, 1829)
- Erromenus analis Brischke, 1871
- Erromenus bibulus Kasparyan, 1973
- Erromenus brunnicans (Gravenhorst, 1829)
- Erromenus calcator (Muller, 1776)
- Erromenus fasciatus (Gravenhorst, 1829)
- Erromenus junior (Thunberg, 1822)
- Erromenus plebejus (Woldstedt, 1877)
- Erromenus punctulatus Holmgren, 1855
- Erromenus zonarius (Gravenhorst, 1820)
- Ethelurgus sodalls (Taschenberg, 1865)
- Ethelurgus vulnerator (Gravenhorst, 1829)
- Euceros albitarsus Curtis, 1837
- Euceros crassicornis Gravenhorst, 1829
- Euceros pruinosus (Gravenhorst, 1829)
- Euceros serricornis (Haliday, 1838)
- Euceros unifasciatus Vollenhoven, 1878
- Eudelus capreolus (Thomson, 1884)
- Eudelus infirmus (Gravenhorst, 1829)
- Eudelus scabriculus (Thomson, 1884)
- Eupalamus lacteator (Gravenhorst, 1829)
- Eupalamus wesmaeli Thomson, 1886
- Eurylabus larvatus (Christ, 1791)
- Eurylabus torvus Wesmael, 1844
- Eurylabus tristis (Gravenhorst, 1829)
- Euryproctus affinis Holmgren, 1855
- Euryproctus alpinus Holmgren, 1855
- Euryproctus annulatus (Gravenhorst, 1829)
- Euryproctus crassicornis Thomson, 1889
- Euryproctus geniculosus (Gravenhorst, 1829)
- Euryproctus holmgreni Kerrich, 1942
- Euryproctus infirus Thomson, 1889
- Euryproctus mundus (Gravenhorst, 1829)
- Euryproctus nemoralls (Geoffroy in Fourcroy, 1785)
- Eusterinx divulgata Förster, 1871
- Eusterinx obscurella Förster, 1871
- Eusterinx tenuicincta (Förster, 1871)
- Eutanyacra crispatorius (Linnaeus, 1758)
- Eutanyacra glaucatorius (Fabricius, 1793)
- Eutanyacra pallidicornis (Gravenhorst, 1829)
- Eutanyacra pictus (Schrank, 1776)
- Exaristes ruficollis (Gravenhorst, 1829)
- Excavarus apiarius (Gravenhorst, 1829)
- Exenterus abruptorius (Thunberg, 1822)
- Exenterus airpersus Hartig, 1838
- Exenterus amictorius (Panzer, 1801)
- Exenterus confusus Kerrich
- Exenterus oriolus Hartig, 1838
- Exenterus tricolor Roman
- Exenterus vellicatus Cushman
- Exephanes amabilis Kriechbaumer, 1895
- Exephanes caelebs Kriechbaumer, 1890
- Exephanes ischioxanthus (Gravenhorst, 1829)
- Exephanes occupator (Gravenhorst, 1829)
- Exephanes ulbrichti Hinz, 1957
- Exetastes adpressorius (Thunberg, 1822)
- Exetastes atrator (Forster, 1771)
- Exetastes calobatus Gravenhorst, 1829
- Exetastes femorator Desvignes, 1856
- Exetastes fornicator (Fabricius, 1781)
- Exetastes illusor Gravenhorst, 1829
- Exetastes laevigator (Villers, 1789)
- Exetastes maurus Desvignes, 1856
- Exetastes nigripes Gravenhorst, 1829
- Exetastes ruficollis (Gravenhorst, 1829)
- Exochus albicinctus Holmgren, 1873
- Exochus alpinus (Zetterstedt, 1838)
- Exochus britannicus Morley, 1911
- Exochus carri Schmiedeknecht, 1924
- Exochus decoratus Holmgren, 1873
- Exochus erythronotus (Gravenhorst, 1820)
- Exochus flavomarginatus Holmgren, 1855
- Exochus fletcheri Bridgman, 1884
- Exochus frontellus Holmgren, 1856
- Exochus gravipes (Gravenhorst, 1820)
- Exochus gravis Gravenhorst, 1829
- Exochus intermedius Morley, 1911
- Exochus lentipes Gravenhorst, 1829
- Exochus lictor Haliday, 1838
- Exochus mitratus Gravenhorst, 1829
- Exochus nigripalpis Thomson, 1887
- Exochus notatus Holmgren, 1856
- Exochus pectoralis Haliday, 1838
- Exochus pictus Holmgren, 1856
- Exochus prosopius Gravenhorst, 1829
- Exochus rubroater Schmiedeknecht, 1924
- Exochus septentrionalis Holmgren, 1873
- Exochus tibialis Holmgren, 1856
- Exyston calcaratus Thomson, 1883
- Exyston pratorum (Woldstedt, 1874)
- Exyston sponsorius (Fabricius, 1781)
- Exyston subnitidus (Gravenhorst, 1829)

=== F ===
- Flavopimpla cicatricosa (Ratzeburg, 1848)
- Fredegunda diluta (Ratzeburg, 1852)

=== G ===
- Gambrus brevispinus (Thomson, 1896)
- Gambrus carnifex (Gravenhorst, 1829)
- Gambrus incubitor (Linnaeus, 1758)
- Gambrus ornatulus (Thomson, 1873)
- Gambrus superus (Thomson, 1896)
- Gelis acarorum (Linnaeus, 1758)
- Gelis agilIs (Fabricius, 1775)
- Gelis albipalpus (Thomson, 1884)
- Gelis alpivagus (Strobl, 1901)
- Gelis analis (Förster, 1850)
- Gelis anthracinus (Förster, 1850)
- Gelis aquisgranensis (Förster, 1850)
- Gelis areator (Panzer, 1804)
- Gelis attentus (Förster, 1850)
- Gelis bicolor (Villers, 1789)
- Gelis brevis (Bridgman, 1883)
- Gelis canailculatus (Förster, 1850)
- Gelis cautus (Förster, 1850)
- Gelis cinctus (Linnaeus, 1758)
- Gelis comes (Förster, 1850)
- Gelis confusus (Bridgman, 1883)
- Gelis corruptor (Förster, 1850)
- Gelis cursitans (Fabricius, 1775)
- Gelis detritus (Förster, 1850)
- Gelis distinctus (Förster, 1850)
- Gelis fallax (Förster, 1850)
- Gelis foersteri (Bridgman, 1886)
- Gelis formicarius (Linnaeus, 1758)
- Gelis fraudulentus (Förster, 1850)
- Gelis frstinans (Fabricius, 1798)
- Gelis gentills (Förster, 1850)
- Gelis gonatopinus (Thomson, 1884)
- Gelis gracills (Förster, 1850)
- Gelis hieracii (Bridgman, 1883)
- Gelis higubris (Förster, 1850)
- Gelis hostitis (Förster, 1850)
- Gelis impotens (Förster, 1850)
- Gelis inandibularis (Thomson, 1884)
- Gelis incubitor (Förster, 1850)
- Gelis indigator (Förster, 1851)
- Gelis inermis (Förster, 1850)
- Gelis insolens (Förster, 1850)
- Gelis instabilis (Förster, 1850)
- Gelis kiesenwetteri (Förster, 1850)
- Gelis longicaudus (Thomson, 1884)
- Gelis lucidulus (Förster, 1850)
- Gelis melanocephalus (Schrank, 1781)
- Gelis micrurus (Förster, 1850)
- Gelis modestus (Förster, 1850)
- Gelis muelleri (Förster, 1850)
- Gelis nigricornis (Förster, 1850)
- Gelis nigritus (Förster, 1850)
- Gelis ovatus (Bridgman, 1883)
- Gelis pedicularius (Fabricius, 1793)
- Gelis pilosus (Capron, 1888)
- Gelis proximus (Förster, 1850)
- Gelis prudens (Förster, 1851)
- Gelis puilcarius (Fabricius, 1793)
- Gelis pumilus (Förster, 1850)
- Gelis quaesitorius (Förster, 1850)
- Gelis rufipes (Förster, 1850)
- Gelis rufulus (Förster, 1850)
- Gelis rugifer (Thomson, 1884)
- Gelis spinulus (Thomson, 1884)
- Gelis stevenii (Gravenhorst, 1829)
- Gelis sylvicolus (Förster, 1850)
- Gelis tener (Förster, 1850)
- Gelis terebrator (Ratzeburg, 1848)
- Gelis timidus (Förster, 1850)
- Gelis tonsus (Förster, 1850)
- Gelis unicolor (Förster, 1850)
- Gelis vagans (Olivier, 1792)
- Gelis vagantiformis (Bridgman, 1886)
- Gelis vigil (Förster, 1850)
- Gelis vulnerans (Förster, 1850)
- Gelis vulpinus (Gravenhorst, 1829)
- Gelis zonatus (Förster, 1850)
- Giraudia gyratoria (Thunberg, 1822)
- Giraudia risescens (Gravenhorst, 1829)
- Glyphicnemis clypealls (Thomson, 1883)
- Glyphicnemis gracills (Kriechbaumer, 1893)
- Glyphicnemis profligator (Fabricius, 1775)
- Glyphicnemis rubricator (Thunberg, 1822)
- Glyphicnemis rustica (Habermehl, 1912)
- Glyphicnemis senilis (Gmelin in Linnaeus, 1790)
- Glyphicnemis sufiblciensis (Morley, 1907)
- Glyphicnemis vagabunda (Gravenhorst, 1829)
- Glyphicnemis varipes (Gravenhorst, 1829)
- Glypta annulata Bridgman, 1890
- Glypta bicornis Boie, 1850
- Glypta bifoveolata Gravenhorst, 1829
- Glypta ceratites (Gravenhorst, 1829)
- Glypta elongata Holmgren, 1860
- Glypta extincta Ratzeburg, 1852
- Glypta femorator Desvignes, 1856
- Glypta flilcornis Thomson, 1887
- Glypta fronticornis (Gravenhorst, 1829)
- Glypta haesitator Gravenhorst, 1829
- Glypta incisa Gravenhorst, 1829
- Glypta lineata Desvignes, 1856
- Glypta longicauda Hartig, 1838
- Glypta lugubrina Holmgren, 1860
- Glypta mensurator (Fabricius, 1775)
- Glypta monoceros Gravenhorst, 1829
- Glypta nigrina Desvignes, 1856
- Glypta parvicaudata Bridgman, 1889
- Glypta parvicornuta Bridgman, 1886
- Glypta pedata Desvignes, 1856
- Glypta punctifrons Bridgman, 1890
- Glypta resinana Hartig, 1838
- Glypta rostrata Holmgren, 1860
- Glypta rubicunda Bridgman, 1890
- Glypta rufata Bridgman, 1888
- Glypta scalaris Gravenhorst, 1829
- Glypta sculpturata Gravenhorst, 1829
- Glypta similis Bridgman, 1886
- Glypta tenuicornis Thomson, 1889
- Glypta teres Gravenhorst, 1829
- Glypta trochanterata Bridgman, 1886
- Glypta vulnerator Gravenhorst, 1829
- Glyptorhaestus punctulatus (Woldstedt, 1877)
- Gnotus chionops (Gravenhorst, 1829)
- Gnotus tenuipes (Gravenhorst, 1829)
- Gnypetomorpha obscura (Bridgman, 1883)
- Goedartia alboguttata (Gravenhorst, 1829)
- Gonolochus caudatus (Holmgren, 1860)
- Gonotypus melanostoma (Thomson, 1887)
- Gonotypus robustus (Woldstedt, 1876)
- Gravenhorstia cerinops (Gravenhorst, 1829)
- Gravenhorstia melanobata (Gravenhorst, 1829)
- Gravenhorstia picta Boie, 1856
- Gregopimpla inquisitor (Scopoli, 1763)
- Grypocentrus albipes Ruthe, 1855
- Grypocentrus apicalis
- Grypocentrus basalls Ruthe, 1855
- Grypocentrus cinctellus Ruthe, 1855
- Grypocentrus incisulus Ruthe, 1855
- Gunomeria macrodactylus

=== H ===
- Habronyx biguttatus (Gravenhorst, 1829)
- Habronyx canaliculatus (Ratzeburg, 1844)
- Habronyx heroes (Wesmael, 1849)
- Habronyx perspicuus (Wesmael, 1849)
- Hadrodactylus bidentulus Thomson, 1883
- Hadrodactylus confusus (Holmgren, 1856)
- Hadrodactylus faciator (Thunberg, 1822)
- Hadrodactylus fugax (Gravenhorst, 1829)
- Hadrodactylus gracilipes Thomson, 1883
- Hadrodactylus gracilis (Stephens, 1835)
- Hadrodactylus marginatus (Bridgman, 1886)
- Hadrodactylus paludicolus (Holmgren, 1855)
- Hadrodactylus riphac (Geoffroy in Fourcroy, 1785)
- Hadrodactylus ventralls (Curtis, 1837)
- Hadrodactylus villosulus Thomson, 1883
- Helcostizus restaurator (Fabricius, 1775)
- Helictes borealis (Holmgren, 1855)
- Helictes coxalis (Förster, 1871)
- Helictes erythrostomus (Gmelin in Linnaeus, 1790)
- Hemichneumon elongatus (Ratzeburg, 1852)
- Hemiteles bipunctator (Thunberg, 1822)
- Hemiteles piceus (Bridgman, 1883)
- Hemiteles similis (Gmelin in Linnaeus, 1790)
- Hepiopelmus melanogaster (Gmelin in Linnaeus, 1790)
- Hepiopelmus variegatorius (Panzer, 1800)
- Hercus fontinalis (Holmgren, 1855)
- Heresiarches eudoxius (Wesmael, 1844)
- Herpestomus arridens (Gravenhorst, 1829)
- Herpestomus brunnicornis (Gravenhorst, 1829)
- Herpestomus nasutus Wesmael, 1844
- Herpestomus wesmaeli Perkins, 1953
- Heterischnus nigricollis (Wesmael, 1844)
- Heterischnus pulex (Müller, 1776)
- Heterischnus thoracicus (Gravenhorst, 1829)
- Heterocola linguaria (Haliday, 1838)
- Heteropelma amictum (Fabricius, 1775)
- Heteropelma calcator (Wesmael, 1849)
- Himerta defectiva (Gravenhorst, 1820)
- Himerta sepulchralls (Holmgren, 1876)
- Homaspis subalpina Schmiedeknecht, 1913
- Homotherus locutor (Thunberg, 1822)
- Homotropus collinus (Stelfox, 1941)
- Homotropus crassicornis (Thomson, 1890)
- Homotropus crassicrus (Thomson, 1890)
- Homotropus dimidiatus (Schrank, 1802)
- Homotropus elegans (Gravenhorst, 1829)
- Homotropus fissorius (Gravenhorst, 1829)
- Homotropus gracilentus (Holmgren, 1856)
- Homotropus impolitus (Stelfox, 1941)
- Homotropus incisus (Thomson, 1890)
- Homotropus longiventris (Thomson, 1890)
- Homotropus megaspis (Thomson, 1890)
- Homotropus neopulcher Horstmann, 1968
- Homotropus nigritarsus (Gravenhorst, 1829)
- Homotropus pallipes (Gravenhorst, 1829)
- Homotropus pictus (Gravenhorst, 1829)
- Homotropus reflexus (Morley, 1906)
- Homotropus signatus (Gravenhorst, 1829)
- Homotropus simulans (Stelfox, 1941)
- Homotropus strigator (Fabricius, 1793)
- Homotropus subopacus (Stelfox, 1941)
- Homotropus sundevalli (Holmgren, 1856)
- Homotropus tarsatorius (Panzer, 1809)
- Homotropus tricolor (Stelfox, 1941)
- Hoplismenus albifrons Gravenhorst, 1829
- Hoplismenus bidentatus (Gmelin in Linnaeus, 1790)
- Hybomischos septemcinctorius (Thunberg, 1822)
- Hybophanes ops (Morley, 1908)
- Hybophanes scabriculus (Gravenhorst, 1829)
- Hypamblys albopictus (Gravenhorst, 1829)
- Hypamblys buccatus (Holmgren, 1855)
- Hypamblys transfuga (Holmgren, 1855)
- Hyperacmus crassicornis (Gravenhorst, 1829)
- Hyposoter albonotatus (Bridgman, 1889)
- Hyposoter anglicanus (Habermehl, 1923)
- Hyposoter barrettii (Bridgman, 1881)
- Hyposoter brischkei (Bridgman, 1882)
- Hyposoter carbonarius (Ratzeburg, 1844)
- Hyposoter didymator (Thunberg, 1822)
- Hyposoter discedens (Schmiedeknecht, 1909)
- Hyposoter dolosus (Gravenhorst, 1829)
- Hyposoter ebeninus (Gravenhorst, 1829)
- Hyposoter fugitivus (Say, 1835)
- Hyposoter fitchil (Bridgman, 1881)
- Hyposoter henaultii (Desvignes, 1856)
- Hyposoter horticola(Gravenhorst, 1829)
- Hyposoter notatus (Gravenhorst, 1829)
- Hyposoter orbator (Gravenhorst, 1829)
- Hyposoter placidus (Desvignes, 1856)
- Hyposoter virginalis (Gravenhorst, 1829)
- Hypsantyx impressus (Gravenhorst, 1829)
- Hypsantyx lituratorius (Linnaeus, 1761)
- Hypsicera curvator (Fabricius, 1793)
- Hypsicera femoralis (Geoffroy in Fourcroy, 1785)
- Hypsicera flaviceps (Ratzeburg, 1852)

=== I ===
- Ichneumon albicollis Wesmael, 1857
- Ichneumon albiger Wesmael, 1844
- Ichneumon analis Gravenhorst, 1829
- Ichneumon aquilonius Perkins, 1953
- Ichneumon bellipes Wesmael, 1844
- Ichneumon bucculentus Wesmael, 1844
- Ichneumon caloscelis Wesmael, 1844
- Ichneumon camelinus Wesmael, 1844
- Ichneumon caproni Perkins, 1953
- Ichneumon cessator Müller, 1776
- Ichneumon computatorius Müller, 1776
- Ichneumon confusor Gravenhorst, 1820
- Ichneumon crassifemur Thomson, 1886
- Ichneumon didymus Gravenhorst, 1829
- Ichneumon emancipatus Wesmael, 1844
- Ichneumon equitatorius Panzer, 1786
- Ichneumon eurycerus Thomson, 1890
- Ichneumon exilicornis Wesmael, 1857
- Ichneumon extensorius Linnaeus, 1758
- Ichneumon femorator Kirby, 1802 nom dub.
- Ichneumon formasus Gravenhorst, 1829
- Ichneumon fuscatus Gmelin in Linnaeus, 1790
- Ichneumon gracilentus Wesmael, 1844
- Ichneumon gracilicornis Gravenhorst, 1829
- Ichneumon haereticus (Wesmael, 1854)
- Ichneumon ignobills Wesmael, 1855
- Ichneumon insidiosus Wesmael, 1844
- Ichneumon latrator Fabricius, 1781
- Ichneumon lautatorius Desvignes, 1856
- Ichneumon ligatorius Thunberg, 1822
- Ichneumon lugens Gravenhorst, 1829
- Ichneumon megapodius Heinrich, 1949
- Ichneumon melanotis Holmgren, 1864
- Ichneumon memorator Wesmael, 1844
- Ichneumon minutorius Desvignes, 1856
- Ichneumon molitorius Linnaeus, 1761
- Ichneumon nereni Thomson, 1887
- Ichneumon primatorius Forster, 1771
- Ichneumon quartanus Perkins, 1953
- Ichneumon rufidorsatus Bridgman, 1888
- Ichneumon sarcitorius Linnaeus, 1758
- Ichneumon septentrionalis Holmgren, 1864
- Ichneumon spurius Wesmael, 1848
- Ichneumon stramentarius Gravenhorst, 1820
- Ichneumon subquadratus Thomson, 1887
- Ichneumon suspiciosus Wesmael, 1844
- Ichneumon terminatorius Gravenhorst, 1820
- Ichneumon tuberculipes Wesmael, 1848
- Ichneumon validicornis Holmgren, 1864
- Ichneumon vulneratorius Zetterstedt, 1838
- Ichneumon walkeri Wesmael, 1848
- Ichneumon xanthorius Forster, 1771
- Idiogramma euryops Schmiedeknecht, 1888
- Idiolispa analis (Gravenhorst, 1807)
- Ischnoceros caligatus (Gravenhorst, 1829)
- Ischnoceros rusticus (Geoffroy in Fourcroy, 1785)
- Ischnus alternator (Gravenhorst, 1829)
- Ischnus inquisitorius (Müller, 1776)
- Ischnus migrator (Fabricius, 1775)
- Ischnus minutorius (Fabricius, 1804)
- Iseropus stercorator (Fabricius, 1793)
- Itamoplex apparitorius (Villers, 1789)
- Itamoplex armator (Fabricius, 1804)
- Itamoplex attentorius (Panzer, 1804)
- Itamoplex diancie (Gravenhorst, 1829)
- Itamoplex inculcator (Linnaeus, 1758)
- Itamoplex minator (Gravenhorst, 1829)
- Itamoplex moschator (Fabricius, 1787)
- Itamoplex spinosus (Gravenhorst, 1829)
- Itamoplex spiralis (Geoffroy in Fourcroy, 1785)
- Itamoplex titubator (Thunberg, 1822)
- Itamoplex tuberculatus (Gravenhorst, 1829)
- Itamoplex viduatorius (Fabricius, 1804)
- Itoplectis alternans (Gravenhorst, 1829)
- Itoplectis aterrima Jussila, 1965
- Itoplectis clavicornis (Thomson, 1889)
- Itoplectis insignis Perkins, 1957
- Itoplectis maculator (Fabricius, 1775)
- Itoplectis melanocephala (Gravenhorst, 1829)

=== J ===
- Javra anomala (Morley, 1908)

=== K ===
- Kristotomus laetus (Gravenhorst, 1829)
- Kristotomus laticeps (Gravenhorst, 1829)
- Kristotomus pumilio (Holmgren, 1855)
- Kristotomus ridibundus (Gravenhorst, 1829)
- Kristotomus triangulatorius (Gravenhorst, 1829)

=== L ===
- Labrossyta scotoptera (Gravenhorst, 1820)
- Lagarotis debitor (Thunberg, 1822)
- Lagarotis semicaligatus (Gravenhorst, 1820)
- Lamachus eques (Hartig, 1838)
- Lamachus pini (Bridgman, 1882)
- Lamachus virgultorum (Gravenhorst, 1829)
- Lathrolestes bipunctatus (Bridgman, 1886)
- Lathrolestes ensator (Brauns, 1898)
- Lathrolestes luteolator (Gravenhorst, 1829)
- Lathrolestes macropygus (Holmgren, 1855)
- Lathrolestes marginatus (Thomson, 1883)
- Lathrolestes minutus (Bridgman, 1888)
- Lathrolestes orbitalls (Gravenhorst, 1829)
- Lathrolestes pleuralis (Thomson, 1883)
- Lathrolestes ungularis (Thomson, 1883)
- Lathrostizus lugens (Gravenhorst, 1829)
- Lathrostizus sternocerus (Thomson, 1887)
- Leipaulus ridibundus (Gravenhorst, 1829)
- Leptacoenites frauenfeldi (Tschek, 1868)
- Leptacoenites notabilis (Desvignes 1856)
- Limerodes arctiventris (Boie, 1841)
- Limerodops elongatus (Brischke, 1878)
- Limerodops subsericans (Gravenhorst, 1820)
- Linycus exhortator (Fabricius, 1787)
- Liotryphon agnoscendus (Roman, 1939)
- Liotryphon caudatus (Ratzeburg, 1848)
- Liotryphon crassisetus (Thomson, 1877)
- Liotryphon punctulatus (Ratzeburg, 1848)
- Liotryphon ruficollis (Desvignes, 1856)
- Liotryphon strobilellae (Linnaeus, 1758)
- Lissonota agnata Gravenhorst, 1829
- Lissonota argiola Gravenhorst, 1829
- Lissonota bellator Gravenhorst, 1829
- Lissonota bilineata Gravenhorst, 1829
- Lissonota buccator (Thunberg, 1822)
- Lissonota carbonaria Holmgren, 1860
- Lissonota catenator (Panzer, 1804)
- Lissonota clypealls Thomson, 1877
- Lissonota coracina (Gmelin)
- Lissonota cylindrator (Fabricius, 1787)
- Lissonota deversor Gravenhorst, 1829
- Lissonota digestor (Thunberg, 1822)
- Lissonota distincta Bridgman, 1889
- Lissonota dubia Holmgren, 1855
- Lissonota femorata Holmgren, 1860
- Lissonota fletcheri Bridgman, 1882
- Lissonota folti Thomson, 1877
- Lissonota formosa Bridgman, 1888
- Lissonota frontalls (Desvignes, 1856)
- Lissonota fulvipes (Desvignes, 1856)
- Lissonota fundator (Thunberg, 1822)
- Lissonota funebris Habermehl, 1923
- Lissonota halldayi Holmgren, 1860
- Lissonota ilnearis Gravenhorst, 1829
- Lissonota impressor Gravenhorst, 1829
- Lissonota insignita Gravenhorst, 1829
- Lissonota leucogona Gravenhorst, 1829
- Lissonota lineata Gravenhorst, 1829
- Lissonota maculata Brischke, 1864
- Lissonota nigridens Thomson, 1889
- Lissonota nitida Bridgman, 1886
- Lissonota paffardi (Morley, 1908)
- Lissonota palpalis Thomson, 1889
- Lissonota parallela Gravenhorst, 1829
- Lissonota quadrinotata Gravenhorst, 1829
- Lissonota saturator (Thunberg, 1822)
- Lissonota segmentator (Fabricius, 1793)
- Lissonota semirufa (Desvignes, 1856)
- Lissonota setosa (Geoffroy in Fourcroy, 1785)
- Lissonota stigmator Aubert, 1972
- Lissonota subaciculata Bridgman, 1886
- Lissonota trochanterator Aubert, 1972
- Lissonota unicincta Holmgren, 1860
- Lissonota variabilis Holmgren, 1860
- Lissonota varipes (Desvignes, 1856)
- Lissonota versicolor Holmgren, 1860
- Listrodromus nycihemerus (Gravenhorst, 1820)
- Listrognathus mactator (Thunberg, 1822)
- Lophyroplectus luteator (Thunberg, 1822)
- Lycorina triangulifera Holmgren, 1859
- Lysibia nana (Gravenhorst, 1829)
- Lysibia proxima (Perkins, 1962)

=== M ===
- Macrus parvulus (Gravenhorst, 1829)
- Mastrus areolaris (Thomson, 1884)
- Mastrus armatus (Gravenhorst, 1829)
- Mastrus auriculatus (Thomson, 1884)
- Mastrus castaneus (Taschenberg, 1865)
- Mastrus coriarius (Taschenberg, 1865)
- Mastrus gallicolus (Bridgman, 1880)
- Mastrus incisus (Bridgman, 1883)
- Mastrus inimicus (Gravenhorst, 1829)
- Mastrus niger (Bridgman, 1883)
- Mastrus nigriventris (Thomson, 1884)
- Mastrus westoni (Bridgman, 1880)
- Medophron afflictor (Gravenhorst, 1829)
- Medophron mixtus (Bridgman, 1883)
- Megaplectes monticola (Gravenhorst, 1829)
- Megastylus cruentator Schiødte, 1838
- Megastylus excubitor (Förster, 1871)
- Megastylus fiavopictus (Gravenhorst, 1829)
- Megastylus impressor Schiødte, 1838
- Megastylus pectoralis (Förster, 1871)
- Megastylus subtiliventris (Förster, 1871)
- Melanichneumon leucocheilus (Wesmael, 1844)
- Meloboris collector (Thunberg, 1822)
- Meloboris crassicornis (Gravenhorst, 1829)
- Meloboris dorsalis (Gravenhorst, 1829)
- Meloboris gracilis Holmgren, 1860
- Meloboris grisescens (Gravenhorst, 1829)
- Meloboris hydropota (Holmgren, 1860)
- Meloboris hygrobia Thomson, 1887
- Meloboris ischnocera Thomson, 1887
- Meloboris litoralis (Holmgren, 1860)
- Meloboris neglecta (Habermehl, 1923)
- Meloboris stagnalis (Holmgren, 1855)
- Meringopus cyanator (Gravenhorst, 1829)
- Meringopus titillator (Linnaeus, 1758)
- Mesochorus aciculatus Bridgman, 1881
- Mesochorus alpigenus Strobl, 1904
- Mesochorus angustatus Thomson, 1886
- Mesochorus anomalus Holmgren, 1860
- Mesochorus arenarius (Haliday, 1838)
- Mesochorus basalis Curtis, 1833
- Mesochorus brevipetiolatus Ratzeburg, 1844
- Mesochorus confusus Holmgren, 1860
- Mesochorus crassicrus Thomson, 1886
- Mesochorus discitergus (Say, 1836)
- Mesochorus formosus Bridgman, 1882
- Mesochorus fulgurans Curtis, 1833
- Mesochorus fuscicornis Brischke, 1880
- Mesochorus giberius (Thunberg, 1822)
- Mesochorus globulator (Thunberg, 1822)
- Mesochorus gracilentus Brischke, 1880
- Mesochorus nigripes Ratzeburg, 1852
- Mesochorus olerum Curtis, 1833
- Mesochorus orbitalis Holmgren, 1860
- Mesochorus pallidus Brischke, 1880
- Mesochorus pectimpes Bridgman, 1883
- Mesochorus pectoralis Ratzeburg, 1844
- Mesochorus pictilis Holmgren, 1860
- Mesochorus politus Gravenhorst, 1829
- Mesochorus semirufus Holmgren, 1860
- Mesochorus sylvarum Curtis, 1833
- Mesochorus tachypus Holmgren, 1860
- Mesochorus temporalis Thomson, 1886
- Mesochorus tenuiscapus Thomson, 1886
- Mesochorus testaceus Gravenhorst, 1829
- Mesochorus tetricus Holmgren, 1860
- Mesochorus velox Holmgren, 1860
- Mesochorus vittator (Zetterstedt, 1838)
- Mesochorus vitticollis Holmgren, 1860
- Mesoleius armillatorius (Gravenhorst, 1807)
- Mesoleius aullcus (Gravenhorst, 1829)
- Mesoleius dubius Holmgren, 1855
- Mesoleius filicornis Holmgren, 1876
- Mesoleius flavopictus (Gravenhorst, 1829)
- Mesoleius frenalis Thomson, 1894
- Mesoleius furax Holmgren, 1855
- Mesoleius immarginatus Thomson, 1894
- Mesoleius leptogaster Holmgren, 1855
- Mesoleius melanoleucus (Gravenhorst, 1829)
- Mesoleius nivalis Holmgren, 1855
- Mesoleius opticus (Gravenhorst, 1829)
- Mesoleius placidus Holmgren, 1855
- Mesoleius pyriformis (Ratzeburg, 1852)
- Mesoleius tenthredinis Morley in Hewitt, 1912
- Mesoleius tenuiventris Holmgren, 1856
- Mesoleius varicoxa (Thomson, 1894)
- Mesoleius variegatus (Jurine, 1807)
- Mesoleptidea bipunctata (Gravenhorst, 1829)
- Mesoleptidea cingulata (Gravenhorst, 1829)
- Mesoleptidea hilaris (Gravenhorst, 1829)
- Mesoleptidea prosoleuca (Gravenhorst, 1829)
- Mesoleptidea stallii (Holmgren, 1856)
- Mesoleptidea xanthostigma (Gravenhorst, 1829)
- Mesoleptus ambiguus (Förster, 1876)
- Mesoleptus flilcornis (Thomson, 1884)
- Mesoleptus laevigatus (Gravenhorst, 1820)
- Mesoleptus marginatus (Thomson, 1884)
- Mesoleptus petiolaris (Thomson, 1884)
- Mesoleptus ripicolus (Thomson, 1884)
- Mesoleptus sollicitus (Förster, 1876)
- Mesoleptus splendens Gravenhorst, 1829
- Mesoleptus transversor (Thunberg, 1822)
- Mesostenidea ligator (Gravenhorst, 1829)
- Mesostenidea obnoxius (Gravenhorst, 1829)
- Mesostenus transfuga Gravenhorst, 1829
- Metopius anxius Wesmael, 1849
- Metopius croceicornis Thomson, 1887
- Metopius dentatus (Fabricius, 1779)
- Metopius dissectorius (Panzer, 1805-1806)
- Metopius leiopygus Förster, 1850
- Metopius pinatorius Brullé, 1846
- Mevesia arguta (Wesmael, 1844)
- Mevesia guttata Perkins, 1953
- Microdiaparsis microcephalus (Gravenhorst, 1829)
- Microdiaparsis neoversutus (Horstmann, 1967)
- Microdiaparsis versutus (Holmgren, 1860)
- Microleptes aquisgranensis (Förster, 1871)
- Microleptes egregius (Schmiedeknecht, 1924)
- Microleptes splendidulus Gravenhorst, 1829
- Micrope macilenta (Wesmael, 1844)
- Misetus oculatus Wesmael, 1844
- Monoblastus brachyacanthus (Omelin in Linnaeus, 1790)
- Monoblastus luteomarginarus (Gravenhorst, 1829)
- Monoblastus marginellus (Gravenhorst, 1829)
- Monoblastus proditor (Gravenhorst, 1829)

=== N ===
- Nanodiaparsis frontellus (Holmgren, 1860)
- Neliopisthus elegans (Ruthe, 1855)
- Nematomicrus tenellus Wesmael, 1844
- Nematopodius formosus Gravenhorst, 1829
- Nemeritis caudatula Thomson, 1887
- Nemeritis lativentris Thomson, 1887
- Nemeritis macrocentra (Gravenhorst, 1829)
- Nemeritis stenura Thomson, 1881
- Neorhacodes ensilni (Ruschka, 1922)
- Neotypus nobilitator (Gravenhorst, 1807)
- Neoxorides nitens (Gravenhorst, 1829)
- Nepiesta mandibularis (Holmgren, 1860)
- Netelia cristatus (Thomson, 1888)
- Netelia dilatatus sens. str. (Thomson, 1888)
- Netelia fuscicornis (Holmgren, 1858)
- Netelia latungulus (Thomson, 1888)
- Netelia melanurus (Thomson, 1888)
- Netelia nigricarpus (Thomson, 1888)
- Netelia ocellaris (Thomson, 1888)
- Netelia opaculus (Thomson, 1888)
- Netelia ornatus (Vollenhoven, 1873)
- Netelia tarsatus (Brischke, 1880)
- Netelia vinulae (Scopoli, 1763)
- Netelia virgatus (Geoffroy in Fourcroy, 1785)
- Neurateles britteni (Waterson, 1929)
- Notopygus emarginatus Holmgren, 1855
- Notosemus bohemani (Wesmael, 1855)

=== O ===
- Obisiphaga stenoptera (Marshall, 1868)
- Odontocolon dentipes (Gmelin in Linnaeus, 1790)
- Odontocolon quercinus (Thomson, 1877)
- Oedemopsis scabricula (Gravenhorst, 1829)
- Oiorhinus pallipalpis Wesmael, 1844
- Olesicampe argentata (Gravenhorst, 1829)
- Olesicampe auctor (Gravenhorst, 1829)
- Olesicampe buccata (Thomson, 1887)
- Olesicampe cavigena (Thomson, 1887)
- Olesicampe clandestina (Holmgren, 1860)
- Olesicampe cothurnata (Holmgren, 1860)
- Olesicampe crassitarsis (Thomson, 1887)
- Olesicampe erythropyga (Holmgren, 1860)
- Olesicampe forticostata (Schmiedeknecht, 1909)
- Olesicampe fulcrans (Thomson, 1887)
- Olesicampe fulviventris (Gmelin in Linnaeus, 1790)
- Olesicampe geniculella (Thomson, 1887)
- Olesicampe gracilipes (Thomson, 1887)
- Olesicampe hyalinata (Holmgren, 1860)
- Olesicampe incrassator (Holmgren, 1855)
- Olesicampe longipes (Müller, 1776)
- Olesicampe luteipes (Thomson, 1887)
- Olesicampe nigroplica (Thomson, 1887)
- Olesicampe pagana (Holmgren, 1860)
- Olesicampe paludicola (Holmgren, 1860)
- Olesicampe praecox (Holmgren, 1860)
- Olesicampe retusa (Thomson, 1887)
- Olesicampe sericea (Holmgren, 1855)
- Olesicampe simplex (Thomson, 1887)
- Olesicampe subcallosa (Thomson, 1887)
- Olesicampe vexata (Holmgren, 1860)
- Olesicampe vitripennis (Holmgren, 1860)
- Olethrodotis modestus (Gravenhorst, 1829)
- Opheltes glaucopterus (Linnaeus, 1758)
- Ophion brevicornis Morley, 1915
- Ophion costatus Ratzeburg, 1848
- Ophion crassicornis Brock, 1982
- Ophion forticornis Morley, 1915
- Ophion longigena Thomson, 1888
- Ophion luteus (Linnaeus, 1758)
- Ophion minutus Kriechbaumer, 1879
- Ophion mocsaryi Brauns, 1889
- Ophion obscuratus Fabricius, 1798
- Ophion parvulus Kriechbaumer, 1879
- Ophion perkinsi Brock, 1982
- Ophion pteridis Kriechbaumer, 1879
- Ophion scuteltaris Thomson, 1888
- Ophion slaviceki Kriechbaumer, 1892
- Ophion ventricosus Gravenhorst, 1829
- Oresbius arridens (Gravenhorst, 1829)
- Oresbius castaneus Marshall, 1867
- Oresbius galactinus (Gravenhorst, 1829)
- Oresbius nivalls (Zetterstedt, 1838)
- Oresbius nycthemerus (Gravenhorst, 1829)
- Oronotus binotatus (Gravenhorst, 1829)
- Orotylus mitis (Wesmael, 1848)
- Orthizema hadrocerum (Thomson, 1884)
- Orthizema rugipectum (Thomson, 1884)
- Orthizema sabannulatum (Bridgman, 1883)
- Orthocentrus asper (Gravenhorst, 1829)
- Orthocentrus attenuatus Holmgren, 1856
- Orthocentrus corrugatus Holmgren, 1856
- Orthocentrus frontator (Zetterstedt, 1838)
- Orthocentrus fulvipes Gravenhorst, 1829
- Orthocentrus marginatus Holmgren, 1856
- Orthocentrus monilicornis Holmgren, 1856
- Orthocentrus petiokiris Thomson, 1897
- Orthocentrus protervus Holmgren, 1856
- Orthocentrus radialis Thomson, 1897
- Orthocentrus repentinus Holmgren, 1856
- Orthocentrus sannio Holmgren, 1856
- Orthocentrus spurius Gravenhorst, 1829
- Orthocentrus stigmaticus Holmgren, 1856
- Orthomiscus unicinctus (Holmgren, 1855)
- Orthopelma brevicorne Morley, 1907
- Orthopelma mediator (Thunberg, 1822)
- Otlophorus caninae (Bridgman, 1886)
- Otlophorus italicus (Gravenhorst, 1829)
- Otlophorus pulverulentus (Holmgren, 1855)
- Otlophorus verpetorum (Gravenhorst, 1829)
- Oxyrrhexis carbonator (Gravenhorst, 1807)
- Oxytorus armatus Thomson, 1883
- Oxytorus luridator (Gravenhorst, 1820)

=== P ===
- Panteles schuetzeana (Roman, 1924)
- Pantisarthrus inaequalis Förster, 1871
- Pantisarthrus luridus Förster, 1871
- Pantorhaestes curvulus (Thomson, 1894)
- Pantorhaestes xanthostomus (Gravenhorst, 1829)
- Paraethecerus elongatus Perkins, 1953
- Parania geniculata (Holmgren, 1857)
- Paraperithous gnathaulax (Thomson, 1877)
- Parathecerus elongatus Perkins, 1953
- Parmortha parvula (Gravenhorst, 1829)
- Parmortha pleuralls (Thomson, 1873)
- Perelissus pictilis Holmgren, 1855
- Perelissus rufoniger (Gravenhorst, 1820)
- Perelissus sericeus (Gravenhorst, 1829)
- Perelissus spilonotus (Stephens, 1835)
- Perilissus buccinator Holmgren, 1855
- Perilissus erythrocephalus (Gravenhorst, 1829)
- Perilissus flilcornis (Gravenhorst, 1820)
- Perilissus lutescens Holmgren, 1855
- Perilissus nigricollis Thomson, 1883
- Perilissus pallidus (Gravenhorst, 1829)
- Perilissus ricievius (Gmelin in Linnaeus, 1790)
- Periope auscultator Haliday, 1838
- Perispuda bignellii (Bridgman, 1881)
- Perispuda facialls (Gravenhorst, 1829)
- Perispuda sulphurata (Gravenhorst, 1807)
- Perithous albicinctus (Gravenhorst, 1829)
- Perithous divinator (Rossius, 1790)
- Perithous mediator (Fabricius, 1804)
- Perithous scurra (Panzer, 1804)
- Perithous septemcinctorius (Thunberg, 1822)
- Phaenolobus terebrator (Scopoli, 1763)
- Phaeogenes bellicornis Wesmael, 1844
- Phaeogenes callopus Wesmael, 1844
- Phaeogenes cephalotes Wesmael, 1844
- Phaeogenes coriaceus Perkins, 1953
- Phaeogenes curator (Thunberg, 1822)
- Phaeogenes distinctus (Bridgman, 1888)
- Phaeogenes elongatus Thomson, 1891
- Phaeogenes eques Wesmael, 1844
- Phaeogenes flavidens Wesmael, 1844
- Phaeogenes foveolatus Perkins, 1953
- Phaeogenes fuscicornis Wesmael, 1844
- Phaeogenes heterogonus Holmgren, 1889
- Phaeogenes impiger Wesmael, 1844
- Phaeogenes infimus Wesmael, 1844
- Phaeogenes invisor (Thunberg, 1822)
- Phaeogenes ischiomellnus (Gravenhorst, 1829)
- Phaeogenes maculicornis (Stephens, 1835)
- Phaeogenes melanogonos (Gmelin in Linnaeus, 1790)
- Phaeogenes modestus Wesmael, 1844
- Phaeogenes mysticus Wesmael, 1855
- Phaeogenes ophthalmicus Wesmael, 1844
- Phaeogenes osculator (Thunberg, 1822)
- Phaeogenes planifrons Wesmael, 1844
- Phaeogenes semivulpinus (Gravenhorst, 1829)
- Phaeogenes stipator Wesmael, 1855
- Phaeogenes suspicax Wesmael, 1844
- Phaeogenes trepidus Wesmael, 1844
- Phaestus anomalus (Brischke, 1871)
- Phobetes atomator (Müller, 1776)
- Phobetes chrysostomus (Gravenhorst, 1829)
- Phobetes femorator (Thomson, 1894)
- Phobetes fuscicornis (Holmgren, 1855)
- Phobetes leptocerus (Gravenhorst, 1820)
- Phobetes nigriceps (Gravenhorst, 1829)
- Phobocampe bicingulata (Gravenhorst, 1829)
- Phobocampe crassiuscula (Gravenhorst, 1829)
- Phobocampe croceipes (Marshall, 1876)
- Phobocampe neglecta (Holmgren, 1860)
- Phobocampe obscurella (Holmgren, 1860)
- Phobocampe unicincta (Gravenhorst, 1829)
- Phradis interstitialis (Thomson, 1889)
- Phradis minutus (Bridgman, 1889)
- Phradis morionellus (Holmgren, 1860)
- Phradis nigritulus (Gravenhorst, 1829)
- Phrudus defictus Stelfox, 1966
- Phrudus monilicornis (Bridgman, 1886)
- Phrudus paradoxus (Schmiedeknecht, 1907)
- Phrudus sinuatus (Roman, 1909)
- Phthorima compressa (Desvignes, 1856)
- Phthorima picta (Habermehl, 1925)
- Phthorima xanthaspis (Thomson, 1890)
- Phygadeuon acutipenmis Thomson, 1884
- Phygadeuon brachyarus Thomson, 1884
- Phygadeuon britannicus Habermehl, 1923
- Phygadeuon canailculatus Thomson, 1889
- Phygadeuon cephalotes Gravenhorst, 1829
- Phygadeuon compactus Morley, 1947
- Phygadeuon crassicornis (Gravenhorst, 1829)
- Phygadeuon cubiceps Thomson, 1884
- Phygadeuon cylindraceus Ruthe, 1859
- Phygadeuon detestator (Thunberg, 1822)
- Phygadeuon devonensis Morley, 1947
- Phygadeuon dimidiatus Thomson, 1884
- Phygadeuon elliotti Morley, 1947
- Phygadeuon exiguus Gravenhorst, 1829
- Phygadeuon flavimanus Gravenhorst, 1829
- Phygadeuon forticornis (Kriechbaumer, 1892)
- Phygadeuon fumator Gravenhorst, 1829
- Phygadeuon gallevensis Morley, 1947
- Phygadeuon geniculatus (Kriechbaumer, 1892)
- Phygadeuon hercynicus Gravenhorst, 1829
- Phygadeuon infelix Dalla Torre, 1902
- Phygadeuon laeviventris Thomson, 1884
- Phygadeuon leucostigmus Gravenhorst, 1829
- Phygadeuon lincolniae Morley, 1947
- Phygadeuon liosternus Thomson, 1884
- Phygadeuon nanus (Gravenhorst, 1829)
- Phygadeuon nitidus Gravenhorst, 1829
- Phygadeuon oppositus Thomson, 1884
- Phygadeuon ovaliformis Dalla Torre, 1902
- Phygadeuon ovatus Gravenhorst, 1829
- Phygadeuon pallicarpus Thomson, 1884
- Phygadeuon paradoxus (Bridgman, 1889)
- Phygadeuon pegomyiae Habermehl, 1928
- Phygadeuon punctiventris Thomson, 1884
- Phygadeuon ragensis Morley, 1947
- Phygadeuon rotundipennis Thomson, 1884
- Phygadeuon rubricaudus Morley, 1947
- Phygadeuon rugulosus Gravenhorst, 1829
- Phygadeuon rusticellae Bridgman, 1886
- Phygadeuon scaposus Thomson, 1884
- Phygadeuon subtilis Gravenhorst, 1829
- Phygadeuon sudvoldensis Morley, 1947
- Phygadeuon surriensis Morley, 1947
- Phygadeuon tenuiscapus Thomson, 1884
- Phygadeuon trichops Thomson, 1884
- Phygadeuon troglodytes Gravenhorst, 1829
- Phygadeuon vagans Gravenhorst, 1829
- Phygadeuon variabills Gravenhorst, 1829
- Phygadeuon vexator (Thunberg, 1822)
- Phytodietus britannicus (Habermehl, 1923)
- Phytodietus gelitorius (Thunberg, 1822)
- Phytodietus genkularus Thomson, 1877
- Phytodietus griseanae Kerrich, 1962
- Phytodietus obscurus Desvignes, 1856
- Phytodietus ornatus Desvignes, 1856
- Phytodietus polyzonias (Forster, 1771)
- Phytodietus rufipes Holmgren, 1860
- Picrostigeus debilis (Gravenhorst, 1829)
- Picrostigeus recticaudus (Thomson, 1897)
- Pimpla aethiops Curtis, 1828
- Pimpla aquilonia Cresson, 1870
- Pimpla arctica Zetterstedt, 1838
- Pimpla contemplator (Müller, 1776)
- Pimpla flavicoxis Thomson, 1877
- Pimpla hypochondriaca (Retzius, 1783)
- Pimpla instigator (Fabricius, 1793)
- Pimpla melanacrias Perkins, 1941
- Pimpla sodalis Ruthe, 1859
- Pimpla spuria Gravenhorst, 1829
- Pimpla turionellae (Linnaeus, 1758)
- Pimpla wilchristi Fitton, Shaw & Gauld, 1988
- Piogaster albina Perkins, 1958
- Piogaster punctulata Perkins, 1958
- Pion fortipes (Gravenhorst, 1829)
- Platophion areolaris (Brauns, 1889)
- Platophion ocellaris (Ulbricht, 1926)
- Platylabops apricus (Gravenhorst, 1820)
- Platylabops pulchellatus (Bridgman, 1889)
- Platylabus concinnus Thomson, 1888
- Platylabus decipiens Wesmael, 1848
- Platylabus dolorosus (Gravenhorst, 1829)
- Platylabus gigas Kriechbaumer, 1886
- Platylabus histrio Wesmael, 1855
- Platylabus intermedius Holmgren, 1871
- Platylabus iridipennis (Gravenhorst, 1829)
- Platylabus nigrocyaneus (Gravenhorst, 1829)
- Platylabus obator (Desvignes, 1856)
- Platylabus odiosus Perkins, 1953
- Platylabus opaculus Thomson, 1888
- Platylabus pedatorius (Fabricius, 1793)
- Platylabus pumillo Holmgren, 1871
- Platylabus punctifrons Thomson, 1888
- Platylabus rufiventris Wesmael, 1844
- Platylabus rufus Wesmael, 1844
- Platylabus stoildus Perkins, 1953
- Platylabus tenuicornis (Gravenhorst, 1829)
- Platylabus transversus Bridgman, 1889
- Platylabus tricingulatus (Gravenhorst, 1820)
- Platylabus variegatus Wesmael, 1844
- Platylabus vibratorius (Thunberg, 1822)
- Platyrhabdus monodon (Thomson, 1884)
- Platyrhabdus rufus (Morley, 1907)
- Plectiscidea canaliculata (Förster, 1871)
- Plectiscidea collaris (Gravenhorst, 1829)
- Plectiscidea distincta (Förster, 1871)
- Plectiscidea eurystigma (Thomson, 1888)
- Plectiscidea fiavicoxis (Förster, 1871)
- Plectiscidea humeralis (Förster, 1871)
- Plectiscidea hyperborea (Holmgren, 1869)
- Plectiscidea melanocera (Förster, 1871)
- Plectiscidea sodolis (Förster, 1871)
- Plectiscidea subteres (Thomson, 1888)
- Plectiscidea subtilis (Förster, 1871)
- Plectiscidea tenuicornis (Förster, 1871)
- Plectiscidea terebrator (Förster, 1871)
- Plectiscus agilis (Holmgren, 1856)
- Plectiscus curvicaudatus (Brischke, 1871)
- Plectocryptus digitatus (Gmelin in Linnaeus, 1790)
- Pleolophus basizonus (Gravenhorst, 1829)
- Pleolophus brachypterus (Gravenhorst, 1815)
- Pleurogyrus persector (Parfitt, 1882)
- Podoschistus scutellaris (Desvignes, 1856)
- Poecilostictus cothurnatus (Gravenhorst, 1829)
- Poemenia collaris Haupt, 1917
- Poemenia hectica (Gravenhorst, 1829)
- Poemenia notata Holmgren, 1859
- Polyaulon paradoxus (Zetterstedt, 1838)
- Polyblastus subalpinus? Holmgren, 1855
- Polyblastus alternans Schiedte, 1839
- Polyblastus annulicornis Giraud, 1871
- Polyblastus bridgmani Parfitt, 1882 nom.dub.
- Polyblastus carbonator Kasparyan, 1970
- Polyblastus cothurnatus (Gravenhorst, 1829)
- Polyblastus macrocentrus Thomson, 1888
- Polyblastus melanostigmus Holmgzen, 1855
- Polyblastus palaemon Schiedte, 1839
- Polyblastus pallicoxa Thomson, 1888
- Polyblastus parvulus (Gravenhorst, 1829)
- Polyblastus pinguis (Gravenhorst, 1820)
- Polyblastus stenocentrus Holmgren, 1855
- Polyblastus subalpinus Holmgren, 1855
- Polyblastus tener Habermehl, 1909
- Polyblastus varitarsus (Gravenhorst, 1829)
- Polyblastus wahlbergi Holmgren, 1855
- Polyblastus westringi Holmgren, 1855
- Polysphincta boops Tschek, 1868
- Polysphincta nielseni Roman, 1923
- Polysphincta rufipes Gravenhorst, 1829
- Polysphincta tuberosa Gravenhorst, 1829
- Polysphincta vexator Fitton, Shaw & Gauld, 1988
- Polytribax arrogans (Gravenhorst, 1829)
- Polytribax errator (Marshall, 1868)
- Polytribax flavopunctatus (Bridgman, 1889)
- Polytribax perspicillator (Gravenhorst, 1807)
- Polytribax rufipes (Gravenhorst, 1829)
- Porizontini albidus (Gmelin in Linnaeus, 1790)
- Porizontini alienatus (Gravenhorst, 1829)
- Porizontini arvensis (Gravenhorst, 1829)
- Porizontini bilobus (Thomson, 1887)
- Porizontini costalis (Thomson, 1887)
- Porizontini crassifemur (Thomson, 1887)
- Porizontini deficiens (Gravenhorst, 1829)
- Porizontini faunus (Gravenhorst, 1829)
- Porizontini geniculatus (Gravenhorst, 1829)
- Porizontini molestus (Gravenhorst, 1829)
- Porizontini paniscus (Gravenhorst, 1829)
- Porizontini planiscapus (Thomson, 1887)
- Porizontini ramidulus (Brischke, 1880)
- Porizontini renominatus (Morley, 1915)
- Porizontini rufifemur (Thomson, 1887)
- Porizontini turionus (Ratzeburg, 1844)
- Porizontini xanthostomus (Gravenhorst, 1829)
- Priopoda stictica (Fabricius, 1798)
- Priopoda xanthospana (Gravenhorst, 1829)
- Pristiceros infractorius (Linnaeus, 1761)
- Pristomerus vulnerator (Panzer, 1799)
- Probles erythrostomus (Gravenhorst, 1829)
- Probles gilvipes (Gravenhorst, 1829)
- Probles marginatus (Bridgman, 1886)
- Probles rufipes (Holmgren, 1860)
- Probles truncorum (Holmgren, 1860)
- Probolus concinnus Wesmael, 1853
- Probolus culpatorius (Linnaeus, 1758)
- Proclitus clypearis Förster, 1871
- Proclitus comes (Haliday, 1838)
- Proclitus edwardsi Roman, 1923
- Proclitus mesoxanthus Förster, 1871
- Proclitus paganus (Haliday, 1838)
- Proclitus periculosus Förster, 1871
- Proclitus praetor (Haliday, 1838)
- Proclitus sincerus Förster, 1871
- Promethes bridgmani Fitton, 1976
- Promethes dodsi (Morley, 1906)
- Promethes sulcator (Gravenhorst, 1829)
- Prosticeros infractorius (Linnaeus, 1761)
- Prosticeros serrarius Gravenhorst, 1829
- Protarchus testatorius (Thunberg, 1822)
- Protichneumon coqueberti (Wesmael, 1848)
- Protichneumon pisorius (Linnaeus, 1758)
- Pseudocymodusa alternans (Gravenhorst, 1829)
- Pseudorhyssa alpestris (Holmgren, 1859)
- Psilomastax pictus (Kriechbaumer, 1882)
- Psilomastax pyramidalis Tischbein, 1868
- Pycnocryptus director (Thunberg, 1822)
- Pygmaeolus niridus (Bridgman, 1889)
- Pyracmon fumipennis (Zetterstedt 1838)

=== R ===
- Rhaestus lativentris (Holmgren, 1856)
- Rhembobius nigriceps (Thomson, 1883)
- Rhembobius nigricollis (Thomson, 1883)
- Rhembobius perscrutator (Thunberg, 1822)
- Rhembobius quadrispinus (Gravenhorst, 1829)
- Rhimphoctona megacephala (Gravenhorst, 1829)
- Rhimphoctona melanura (Holmgren, 1860)
- Rhimphoctona obscuripes (Holmgren, 1860)
- Rhimphoctona xoridiformis (Holmgren, 1860)
- Rhinotorus atratus (Holmgren, 1855)
- Rhinotorus leucostomus (Gravenhorst, 1829)
- Rhinotorus longicornis (Schmiedeknecht, 1914)
- Rhinotorus similis (Brischke, 1892)
- Rhorus lapponicus? (Roman, 1909)
- Rhorus caproni (Bridgman, 1882)
- Rhorus chrysopus (Gmelin in Linnaeus, 1790)
- Rhorus exitirpatorius (Gravenhorst, 1829)
- Rhorus glaber (Bridgman, 1886)
- Rhorus longicornis (Holmgren, 1856)
- Rhorus longigena (Thomson, 1883)
- Rhorus mesoxanthus (Gravenhorst, 1829)
- Rhorus neustriae (Schrank, 1802)
- Rhorus palustris (Holmgren, 1855)
- Rhorus subfasciatus (Stephens, 1835)
- Rhynchobanchus flavopictus Heinrich
- Rhysella approximator (Fabricius, 1793)
- Rhyssa persuasoria (Linnaeus, 1758)
- Rhyssella approximator (Fabricius, 1793)
- Rhyssolabus arcticus Hellén, 1942

=== S ===
- Scambus annulatus (Kiss, 1924)
- Scambus arundinator (Fabricius, 1804)
- Scambus brevicornis (Gravenhorst, 1829)
- Scambus buolianae (Hartig, 1838)
- Scambus calobatus (Gravenhorst, 1829)
- Scambus cincticarpus (Krichbaumer, 1895)
- Scambus detritus (Holmgren, 1860)
- Scambus dilutus (Ratzeburg, 1852)
- Scambus elegans (Woldstedt, 1876)
- Scambus eucosmidarum (Perkins, 1957)
- Scambus foliae (Cushman, 1938)
- Scambus nigricans (Thomson, 1877)
- Scambus nitidus (Brauns, 1898)
- Scambus phragmitidis (Perkins, 1957)
- Scambus planatus (Hartig, 1838)
- Scambus pomorum (Ratzeburg, 1848)
- Scambus sagax Hartig, 1838
- Scambus signatus (Pfeffer, 1913)
- Scambus vesicarius (Ratzeburg, 1844)
- Schenkia graminicola (Gravenhorst, 1829)
- Schenkia spinolcie (Gravenhorst, 1829)
- Schizopyga circulator (Panzer, 1801)
- Schizopyga frigida Cresson, 1870
- Schizopyga podagrica Gravenhorst, 1829
- Schizopyga varipes Holmgren, 1856
- Scizopyga podagrica (Gravenhorst, 1829)
- Scolobates auriculatus (Fabricius, 1804)
- Scopesis bicolor (Gravenhorst, 1829)
- Scopesis depressa (Thomson, 1894)
- Scopesis fraterna (Holmgren, 1855)
- Scopesis gesticulator (Thunberg, 1822)
- Scopesis macropa (Thomson, 1894)
- Scopesis obscura (Holmgren, 1855)
- Scopesis rufolabris (Zetterstedt, 1838)
- Scopesis rufonotata (Holmgren, 1876)
- Scopesis tegularis (Thomson, 1894)
- Sinarachna anomala (Holmgren, 1860)
- Sinarachna nigricornis (Holmgren, 1860)
- Sinarachna pallipes (Holmgren, 1860)
- Smicroplectrus bohemani (Holmgren, 1855)
- Smicroplectrus erosus (Holmgren, 1855)
- Smicroplectrus excisus Kerrich, 1952
- Smicroplectrus heinrichi Kerrich, 1952
- Smicroplectrus jucundus (Holmgren, 1855)
- Smicroplectrus perkinsorum Kerrich, 1952
- Smicroplectrus quinquecinctus (Gravenhorst, 1820)
- Sphecophaga vesparum (Curtis, 1828)
- Sphinctus serotinus Gravenhorst, 1829
- Spilichneumon celenae Perkins, 1953
- Spilichneumon occisorius (Fabricius, 1793)
- Spilichneumon stagnicola (Thomson, 1888)
- Spilothyrateles fabricii (Schrank, 1802)
- Spilothyrateles punctus (Gravenhorst, 1829) preocc.
- Spudastica kriechbaumeri (Bridgman, 1882)
- Stauropoctonus bombycivorus (Gravenhorst, 1829)
- Stenarella gladiator (Scopoli, 1763)
- Stenichneumon culpator (Schrank, 1802)
- Stenichneumon militarius (Thunberg, 1822)
- Stenobarichneumon basiglyptus (Kriechbaumer, 1890)
- Stenobarichneumon citator (Thunberg, 1822)
- Stenodontus marginellus (Gravenhorst, 1829)
- Stenomacrus affinis misident.
- Stenomacrus binotatus (Holmgren, 1856)
- Stenomacrus carbonariae Roman, 1939
- Stenomacrus caudotus (Holmgren, 1856)
- Stenomacrus cognatus (Holmgren, 1856)
- Stenomacrus concinnus (Holmgren, 1856)
- Stenomacrus confinis (Holmgren, 1856)
- Stenomacrus cubiceps (Thomson, 1897)
- Stenomacrus deletus (Thomson, 1897)
- Stenomacrus exserens (Thomson, 1897)
- Stenomacrus flaviceps (Gravenhorst, 1829)
- Stenomacrus fortipes (Thomson, 1897)
- Stenomacrus incisus (Gravenhorst, 1829)
- Stenomacrus innotatus (Thomson, 1897)
- Stenomacrus intermedius (Holmgren, 1856)
- Stenomacrus laricis (Haliday, 1838)
- Stenomacrus molestus (Holmgren, 1856)
- Stenomacrus ochripes (Holmgren, 1856)
- Stenomacrus palustris (Holmgren, 1856)
- Stenomacrus reptilis (Marshall, 1877)
- Stenomacrus silvaticus (Holmgren, 1856)
- Stenomacrus tristis (Holmgren, 1856)
- Stenomacrus ventralis (Holmgren, 1856)
- Stibeutes curvispinus (Thomson, 1884)
- Stibeutes gravenhorstii Förster, 1850
- Stibeutes heinemanni Förster, 1850
- Stiboscopus angilcanus (Morley, 1907)
- Stiboscopus notaulius (Morley, 1947)
- Stictopisthus complanatus (Haliday, 1838)
- Stictopisthus convexicollis (Thomson, 1886)
- Stictopisthus unicinctor (Thunberg, 1822)
- Stilbops abdominalls (Gravenhorst, 1829)
- Stilbops asper (Schmiedeknecht, 1913)
- Stilbops limneriaeformis Schmiedeknecht, 1888
- Stilbops Linnaeriformis Schmiedeknecht, 1888
- Stilbops ruficornis (Gravenhorst, 1829)
- Stilbops vetula (Gravenhorst, 1829)
- Stilpnus blandus Gravenhorst, 1829
- Stilpnus crassicornis Thomson, 1884
- Stilpnus deplanatus Gravenhorst, 1829
- Stilpnus dryadum Curtis, 1832
- Stilpnus gagates (Gravenhorst, 1807)
- Stilpnus pavoniae (Scopoli, 1763)
- Stilpnus tenebricosus (Gravenhorst, 1829)
- Stilpnus tenuipes Thomson, 1884
- Sulcarlus biannulatus (Gravenhorst, 1829)
- Sussaba cognata (Holmgren, 1856)
- Sussaba coriacea Dasch, 1964
- Sussaba dorsalis (Holmgren, 1856)
- Sussaba elongata (Provancher, 1874)
- Sussaba erigator (Fabricius, 1793)
- Sussaba puichella (Holmgren, 1856)
- Sussaba punctiventris (Thomson, 1890)
- Sympherta ambulator (Thunberg, 1822)
- Sympherta antilope (Gravenhorst, 1829)
- Sympherta fuscicornis (Gmelin in Linnaeus, 1790)
- Symplecis alpicola Förster, 1871
- Symplecis breviscula Roman, 1923
- Symplecis xanthostoma Förster, 1871
- Syndipnus lateralis (Gravenhorst, 1829)
- Synetaeris heteropus Thomson, 1887
- Synodites facialis? (Thomson, 1894)
- Synodites notatus (Gravenhorst, 1829)
- Synodites sinister (Brischke, 1871)
- Synomelix albipes (Gravenhorst, 1829)
- Synomelix scutulata (Hartig, 1838)
- Syntactus delusor (Linnaeus, 1758)
- Syntactus minor (Holmgren, 1855)
- Syntactus minutus (Bridgman, 1886)
- Syrphoctonus abdominator (Bridgman, 1886)
- Syrphoctonus biguttatus (Gravenhorst, 1829)
- Syrphoctonus collinus (Stelfox, 1941)
- Syrphoctonus crassicornis (Thomson, 1890)
- Syrphoctonus crassicrus (Thomson, 1890)
- Syrphoctonus dimidiatus (Schrank, 1802)
- Syrphoctonus elegans (Gravenhorst, 1829)
- Syrphoctonus fissorius (Gravenhorst, 1829)
- Syrphoctonus flavolineatus (Gravenhorst, 1829)
- Syrphoctonus gracilentus (Holmgren, 1856)
- Syrphoctonus impolitus (Stelfox, 1941)
- Syrphoctonus incisus (Thomson, 1890)
- Syrphoctonus longiventris (Thomson, 1890)
- Syrphoctonus megaspis (Thomson, 1890)
- Syrphoctonus neopulcher Horstman, 1968
- Syrphoctonus nigritarsus (Gravenhorst, 1829)
- Syrphoctonus pallipes (Gravenhorst, 1829)
- Syrphoctonus pictus (Gravenhorst, 1829)
- Syrphoctonus reflexus (Morley, 1906)
- Syrphoctonus signatus (Gravenhorst, 1829)
- Syrphoctonus simulans (Stelfox, 1941)
- Syrphoctonus strigator (Fabricius, 1793)
- Syrphoctonus subopacus (Stelfox, 1941)
- Syrphoctonus sundevalli (Holmgren, 1856)
- Syrphoctonus tarsatorius (Panzer, 1809)
- Syrphoctonus tricolor (Stelfox, 1941)
- Syrphophilus bizonarius (Gravenhorst, 1829)
- Syrphophilus tricinctorius (Thunberg, 1822)
- Syspasis lineator (Fabricius, 1781)
- Syspasis rufinus (Gravenhorst, 1820)
- Syspasis scutellator (Gravenhorst, 1829)
- Syzeuctus bicornis (Gravenhorst, 1829)
- Syzeuctus irrisorius (Rossius, 1794)
- Syzeuctus maculatorius (Fabricius, 1787) preocc.

=== T ===
- Temelucha arenosa (Szapligeti, 1900)
- Temelucha interruptor (Gravenhorst, 1829)
- Temelucha ophthalmica (Holmgren, 1860)
- Temelucha signata (Holmgren, 1860)
- Tersilochus cognatus (Holmgren, 1860)
- Tersilochus heterocerus (Thomson, 1889)
- Tersilochus liopleuris (Thomson, 1889)
- Tersilochus sallator (Fabricius, 1781) preocc.
- Tersilochus triangularis (Gravenhorst, 1807)
- Therion brevicorne (Gravenhorst, 1829)
- Therion circumfiexum (Linnaeus, 1758)
- Theronia atalantae (Poda, 1761)
- Theroscopus annulicornis (Thomson, 1884)
- Theroscopus hemipterus (Fabricius, 1793)
- Theroscopus londinensis (Morley, 1947)
- Theroscopus marshalli (Bridgman & Fitch, 1882)
- Theroscopus micator (Gravenhorst, 1807)
- Theroscopus occisor (Habermehl, 1923)
- Theroscopus pedestris (Fabricius, 1775)
- Thrybius leucopygus (Gravenhorst, 1829)
- Thymaris contaminatus (Gravenhorst, 1829)
- Thymaris fenestralis Morley, 1908
- Thymaris srikem Fitton & Ficken, 1989
- Thymaris tener (Gravenhorst, 1829)
- Townesia tenuiventris (Holmgren, 1860)
- Trachyarus corvinus Thomson, 1891
- Tranosema arenicola Thomson, 1887
- Trematopygus dictator (Thunberg, 1822)
- Trematopygus vellicans (Gravenhorst, 1829)
- Tricholabus strigatorius (Gravenhorst, 1829)
- Trichomma enecator (Rossius, 1790)
- Trichomma fulvidens (Wesmael, 1849)
- Trichomma intermedium Krieger, 1904
- Trichomma occisor Habermehl, 1909
- Triclistus aethiops (Gravenhorst, 1829)
- Triclistus albicinctus Thomson, 1887
- Triclistus areolatus Thomson, 1887
- Triclistus congener (Holmgren, 1856)
- Triclistus facialis Thomson, 1887
- Triclistus globulipes (Desvignes, 1856)
- Triclistus lativentris Thomson, 1887
- Triclistus longicalcar Thomson, 1887
- Triclistus niger (Bridgman, 1883)
- Triclistus pallipes Holmgren, 1873
- Triclistus podogricus (Gravenhorst, 1829)
- Triclistus pubiventris Thomson, 1887
- Triclistus pygmaeus (Cresson, 1864)
- Triclistus spiracularis Thomson, 1887
- Triclistus squalidus (Holmgren, 1856)
- Triclistus yponomeutae Aeschlimann, 1973
- Trieces tricarinatus (Holmgren, 1856)
- Trigonalis hahnii (Spinola, 1840)
- Triptognathus amatorius (Müller, 1776)
- Triptognathus johansoni (Holmgren, 1871)
- Triptognathus propinauus (Perkins, 1953)
- Triptognathus pulchellus (Christ, 1791)
- Trogus lapidator (Fabricius, 1787)
- Tromatobia forsiusi (Hellen, 1915)
- Tromatobia oculatoria (Fabricius, 1798)
- Tromatobia ornata (Gravenhorst, 1829)
- Tromatobia ovivora (Boheman, 1821)
- Tromatobia rufipleura (Bignell, 1889)
- Tromatobia variabilis (Holmgren, 1856)
- Tropistes nitidipennis Gravenhorst, 1829
- Trychosis legator (Thunberg, 1822)
- Trychosis mesocastana (Tschek, 1870)
- Tryphon abditus Kasparyan, 1969
- Tryphon anceps Stephens, 1853 nom dub
- Tryphon atriceps Stephens, 1835
- Tryphon auricularis Thomson, 1883
- Tryphon bidentatus Stephens, 1835
- Tryphon bidentulus Thomson, 1883
- Tryphon brunniventris Gravenhorst, 1829
- Tryphon duplicatus (Heinrich, 1953)
- Tryphon exclamationis Gravenhorst, 1829
- Tryphon heliophilus Gravenhorst, 1829
- Tryphon incestus Holmgren, 1855
- Tryphon nigripes Holmgren, 1855
- Tryphon obtusator (Thunberg, 1822)
- Tryphon relator (Thunberg, 1822)
- Tryphon rngnpes Holmgren, 1855
- Tryphon rutilator (Linnaeus, 1161)
- Tryphon signator Gravenhorst, 1829
- Tryphon subsulcatus Holmgren, 1855
- Tryphon thomsoni Roman, 1939
- Tryphon thoracicus Stephens, 1853 nom dub
- Tryphon trochanteratus Holmgren, 1855
- Tryphon zonatus Stephens, 1853 nom dub
- Tymmophorus graculus (Gravenhorst, 1829)
- Tymmophorus obscuripes (Holmgren, 1856)
- Tymmorphorus rufiventris (Gravenhorst, 1829)

=== V ===
- Venturia canescens (Gravenhorst, 1829)
- Venturia moderator (Linnaeus, 1758)
- Venturia transfuga (Gravenhorst, 1829)
- Vulgichneumon saturatorius (Linnaeus, 1758)

=== W ===
- Woldstedtius abdominator (Bridgman, 1829)
- Woldstedtius biguttatus (Gravenhorst, 1829)
- Woldstedtius flavolineatus (Gravenhorst, 1829)

=== X ===
- Xenolytus bitinctus (Gmelin in Linnaeus, 1790)
- Xenoschesis fulvipes (Gravenhorst, 1829)
- Xenoschesis resplendens (Holmgren, 1855)
- Xenoschesis ustulata (Desvignes, 1856)
- Xestopelta gracillima (Schmiedeknecht, 1926)
- Xiphulcus floricolator (Gravenhorst, 1807)
- Xorides brachylabis (Kriechbaumer, 1889)
- Xorides cskii Clément, 1938
- Xorides fuilgator (Thunberg, 1822)
- Xorides gravenhorstii (Curtis, 1831)
- Xorides irrigator (Fabricius, 1793)
- Xorides niger (Pfeffer, 1913)
- Xorides praecatorius (Fabricius, 1793)
- Xorides rufipes (Gravenhorst, 1829)
- Xorides rusticus (Desvignes, 1856)
- Xorides securicornis (Holmgren, 1860)
- Xylophrurus dispar (Thunberg, 1822)

=== Z ===
- Zaglyptus multicolor (Gravenhorst, 1829)
- Zaglyptus varipes (Gravenhorst, 1829)
- Zatypota albicoxa (Walker, 1874)
- Zatypota bohemani (Holmgren, 1860)
- Zatypota discolor (Holmgren, 1860)
- Zatypota percontatoria (Mailer, 1776)

== Sources ==
- Aubert, J. F. (1969): Les Ichneumonides ouest-palearctiques et leurs hotes 1. Pimplinae, Xoridinae, Acaenitinae ["The Western Palearctic ichneumon wasps and their hosts. 1. Pimplinae, Xoridinae, Acaenitinae"]. Laboratoire d'évolution des êtres organisés, Paris. [in French]
- Aubert, J. F. (1978): Les Ichneumonides ouest-palearctiques et leurs hotes 2. Banchinae et Suppl. aux Pimplinae ["The Western Palearctic ichneumon wasps and their hosts. 2. Banchinae and supplement to the Pimplinae"]. Laboratoire d'évolution des êtres organisés, Paris & EDIFAT-OPIDA, Echauffour. [in French]
- Aubert, J. F. (2000): Les ichneumonides oeust-palearctiques et leurs hotes. 3. Scolobatinae (=Ctenopelmatinae) et suppl. aux volumes precedents [The West Palaearctic ichneumonids and their hosts. 3. Scolobatinae (= Ctenopelmatinae) and supplements to preceding volumes]. Litterae Zoologicae 5: 1-310.
- Fitton, M.G. & I. D. Gauld (1976): The family-group names of the Ichneumonidae (excluding Ichneumoninae) (Hymenoptera). Systematic Entomology 1: 247-258.
- Fitton, M. G. & I. D. Gauld (1978): Further notes on family-group names of Ichneumonidae (Hymenoptera). Systematic Entomology 3: 245-247.
- Gauld, I. D. (1976): The classification of the Anomaloninae (Hymenoptera: Ichneumonidae). Bulletin of the British Museum of Natural History (Entomology) 33: 1-135.
- Oehlke J. (1966): Die westpaläarktische Arte der Tribus Poemeniini (Hymenoptera, Ichneumonidae) ["The Western Palearctic species of the tribe Poemeniini"]. Beiträge zur Entomologie 15: 881-892.
- Oehlke J. (1967): Westpaläarktische Ichneumonidae 1, Ephialtinae. Hymenopterorum Catalogus (new edition) 2: 1–49.
- Perkins, J. F. (1959): Ichneumonidae, key to subfamilies and Ichneumoninae – 1. Handbook for the Identification of British Insects 7(part 2ai): 1–116.
- Perkins, J. F. (1960): Hymenoptera: Ichneumonoidea: Ichneumonidae, subfamilies Ichneumoninae 2, Alomyinae, Agriotypinae and Lycorininae. Handbk Ident. Br. Insects 7(part 2aii): 1–96.
- Sime, K., & A. Brower (1998): Explaining the latitudinal gradient anomaly in ichneumonid species richness: evidence from butterflies. Journal of Animal Ecology 67: 387-399
- Townes, H. K. (1969): Genera of Ichneumonidae, Part 1 (Ephialtinae, Tryphoninae, Labiinae, Adelognathinae, Xoridinae, Agriotypinae). Memoirs of the American Entomological Institute 11: 1-300.
- Townes, H. K. (1969): Genera of Ichneumonidae, Part 2 (Gelinae). Memoirs of the American Entomological Institute 12: 1-537.
- Townes, H. K. (1969): Genera of Ichneumonidae, Part 3 (Lycorininae, Banchinae, Scolobatinae, Porizontinae). Memoirs of the American Entomological Institute 13: 1-307.
- Townes, H. K. (1971): Genera of Ichneumonidae, Part 4 (Cremastinae, Phrudinae, Tersilochinae, Ophioninae, Mesochorinae, Metopiinae, Anomalinae, Acaenitinae, Microleptinae, Orthopelmatinae, Collyriinae, Orthocentrinae, Diplazontinae). Memoirs of the American Entomological Institute 17: 1-372.
- Townes, H. K., S. A. Momoi & M. Townes (1965): Catalogue and Reclassification of Eastern Palearctic Ichneumonidae Memoirs of the American Entomological Institute 5: 1-661 pages.
- Wahl, David (1999): Classification and Systematics of the Ichneumonidae (Hymenoptera). Version of July 19, 1999. Retrieved June 18, 2008.
