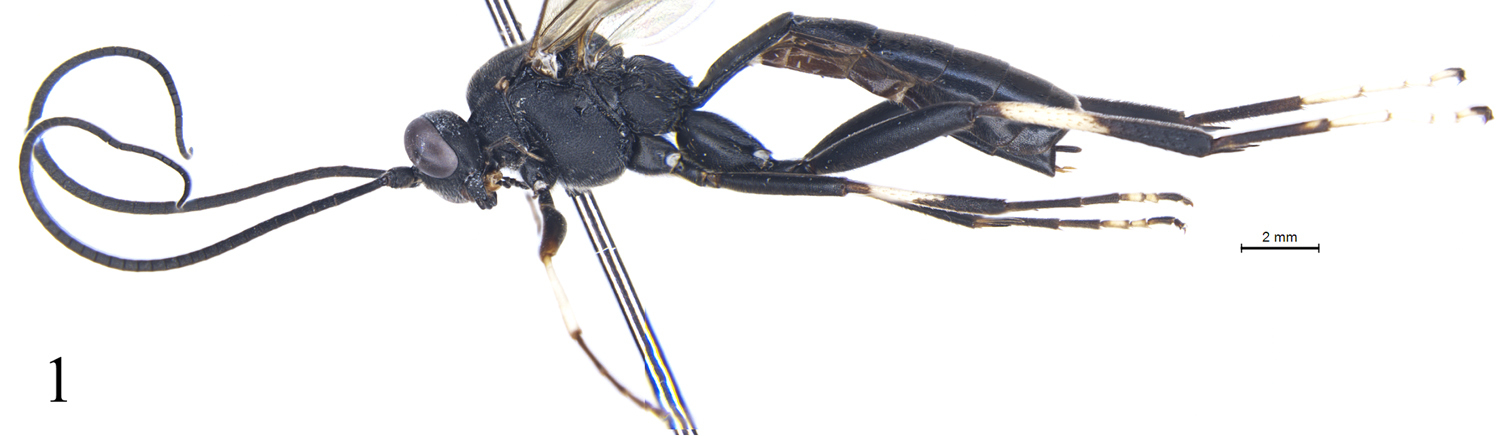
- Alexeter beijingensis

Scientific classification
- Kingdom: Animalia
- Phylum: Arthropoda
- Class: Insecta
- Order: Hymenoptera
- Family: Ichneumonidae
- Genus: Alexeter; Förster, 1869

= Alexeter =

Genus of wasps

Alexeter is a genus of insect belonging to the family Ichneumonidae.

The genus was first described by Förster in 1869.

The species of this genus are found in Europe, Asia and North America.

Species:

- Alexeter albimaculatus Sheng, Sun & Li, 2020
- Alexeter angularis (Uchida, 1952)
- Alexeter beijingensis Sheng, 2019
- Alexeter fallax
- Alexeter flavicoxa
