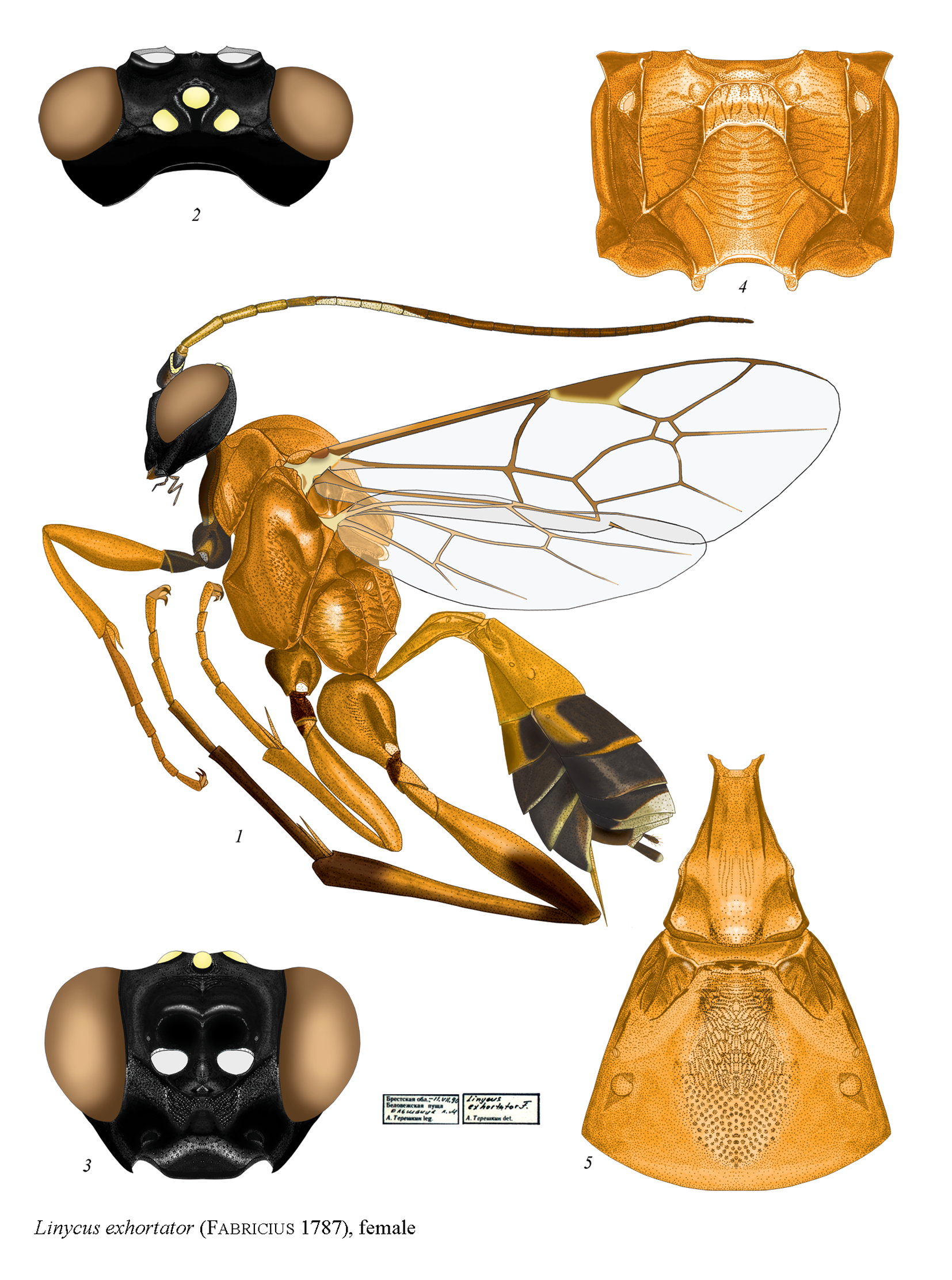

Scientific classification
- Kingdom: Animalia
- Phylum: Arthropoda
- Class: Insecta
- Order: Hymenoptera
- Family: Ichneumonidae
- Genus: Linycus; Cameron, 1903

= Linycus =

Genus of insects

Linycus is a genus of parasitoid wasps belonging to the family Ichneumonidae. This parasitoid's hosts are typically Geometridae.

The species of this genus are found in Europe, North America, and Japan.

Species:

- Linycus algericus (Habermehl, 1917)
- Linycus annulicornis (Cameron, 1904)
- Linycus exhortator (Fabricius, 1787)
- Linycus kyoheii Kikuchi & Konishi, 2021
