= Eridolius elegans =

Scientific classification
- Kingdom: Animalia
- Phylum: Arthropoda
- Class: Insecta
- Order: Hymenoptera
- Family: Ichneumonidae
- Genus: Eridolius
- Species: E. elegans

Binomial name
- Eridolius elegans (Stephens, 1835)

Synonyms
- Eridolius aulicus (Roman, 1914); Tryphon elegans Stephens, 1835

Species of wasp

Eridolius elegans is a species of wasp. It is found in Europe.

== See also ==
- Checklist of UK recorded Ichneumonidae
