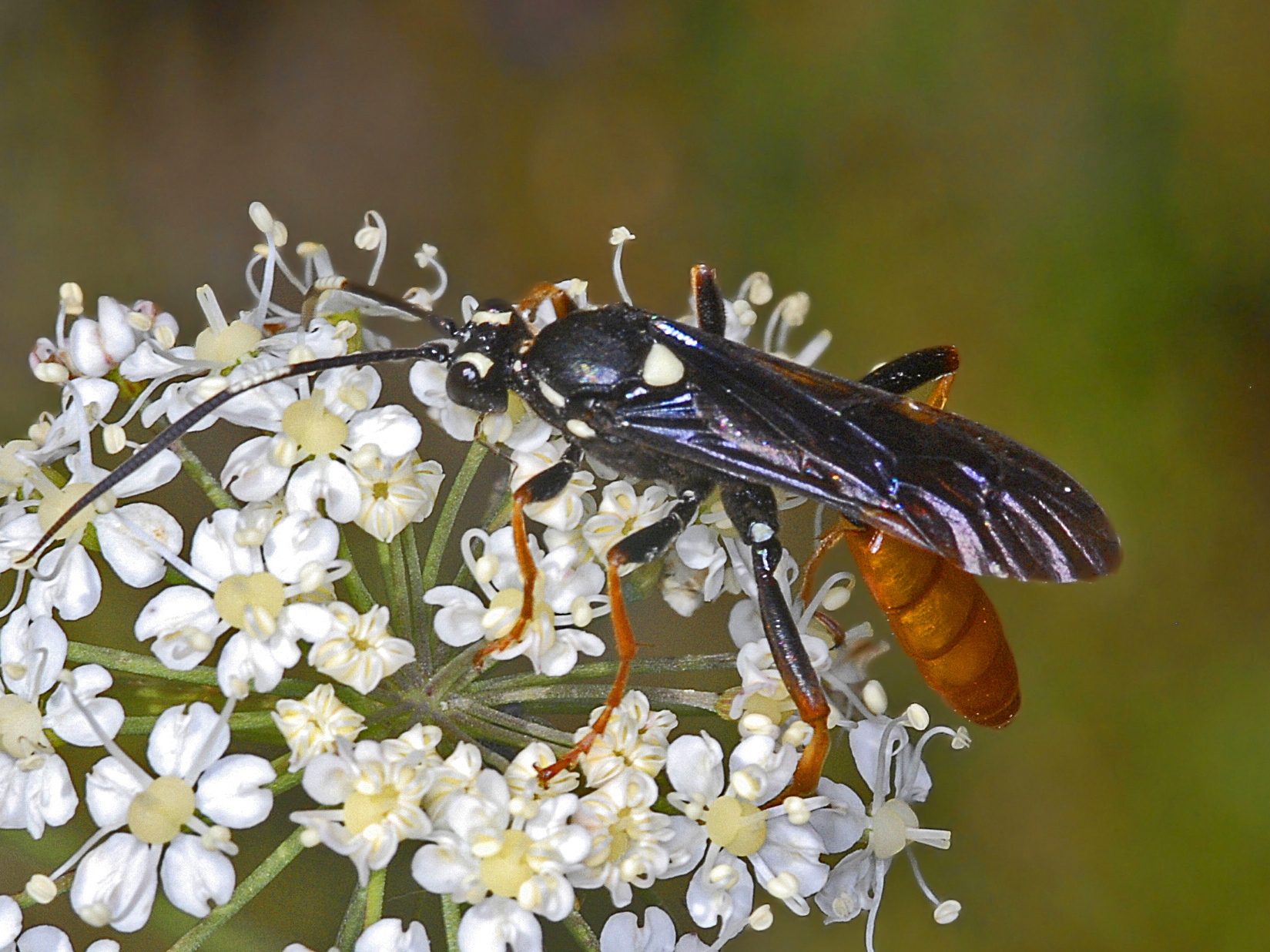
- Amblyjoppa fuscipennis

Scientific classification
- Kingdom: Animalia
- Phylum: Arthropoda
- Clade: Pancrustacea
- Class: Insecta
- Order: Hymenoptera
- Family: Ichneumonidae
- Genus: Amblyjoppa; Cameron, 1902

= Amblyjoppa =

Genus of wasps

Amblyjoppa is a genus of wasps belonging to the family Ichneumonidae.

== Species ==
- Amblyjoppa
  - Amblyjoppa aelvana
  - Amblyjoppa annulitarsis
  - Amblyjoppa attentatoria
  - Amblyjoppa basalis
  - Amblyjoppa brunneipennis
  - Amblyjoppa celebica
  - Amblyjoppa cognatoria
  - Amblyjoppa forticornis
  - Amblyjoppa fumipennis
  - Amblyjoppa fuscipennis
  - Amblyjoppa magna
  - Amblyjoppa mengkokae
  - Amblyjoppa oiwakensis
  - Amblyjoppa proteus
  - Amblyjoppa rufobalteata
  - Amblyjoppa semirufa
  - Amblyjoppa sinensis
  - Amblyjoppa sulcata
  - Amblyjoppa varipes
  - Amblyjoppa yayeyamensis
