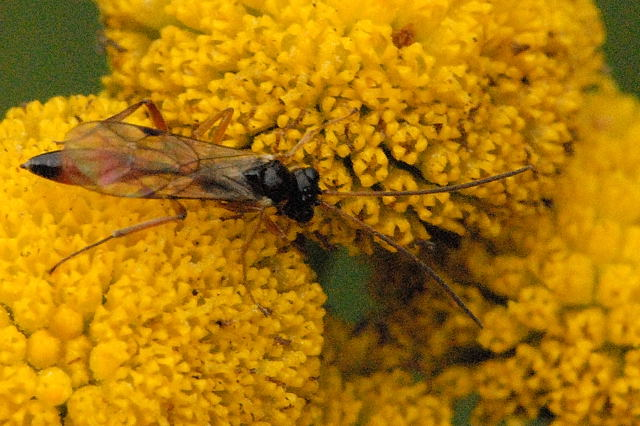
- Eridolius dorsator from Commanster, Belgian High Ardennes

Scientific classification
- Kingdom: Animalia
- Phylum: Arthropoda
- Class: Insecta
- Order: Hymenoptera
- Family: Ichneumonidae
- Subfamily: Tryphoninae
- Tribe: Exenterini
- Genus: Eridolius; Förster, 1869

Species
- See text

= Eridolius =

Genus of wasps

Eridolius is a genus of wasps.

== Species ==
- Eridolius aithogaster
- Eridolius alacer
- Eridolius albicoxa
- Eridolius albilineatus
- Eridolius astenoctenus
- Eridolius aurifluus
- Eridolius autumnalis
- Eridolius basalis
- Eridolius bimaculatus - parasitoid of Pristophora luteipes sawfly.
- Eridolius brevicornis
- Eridolius clauseni
- Eridolius clypeatus
- Eridolius consobrinus
- Eridolius consors
- Eridolius curtisii - parasitoid of Hemichroa australis sawfly
- Eridolius dahlbomi
- Eridolius deletus
- Eridolius dorsator
- Eridolius elegans
- Eridolius ermolenkoi
- Eridolius flavicoxae
- Eridolius flavicoxator
- Eridolius flavomaculatus
- Eridolius foveator
- Eridolius frontator
- Eridolius funebris
- Eridolius gibbulus
- Eridolius gnathoxanthus
- Eridolius hofferi
- Eridolius kambaiti
- Eridolius kamikochi
- Eridolius lineiger
- Eridolius lionyx
- Eridolius mongolicus
- Eridolius niger
- Eridolius orbitalis
- Eridolius orientalis
- Eridolius pachysoma
- Eridolius pallicoxator
- Eridolius paululus
- Eridolius pictus
- Eridolius pullus
- Eridolius pygmaeus
- Eridolius romani
- Eridolius rubricoxa
- Eridolius rufilabris
- Eridolius rufofasciatus
- Eridolius rufonotatus
- Eridolius schiödtei
- Eridolius similis
- Eridolius sinensis
- Eridolius taigensis
- Eridolius tobiasi
- Eridolius ungularis
- Eridolius ussuriensis
- Eridolius verzhutzkii
- Eridolius wahli
