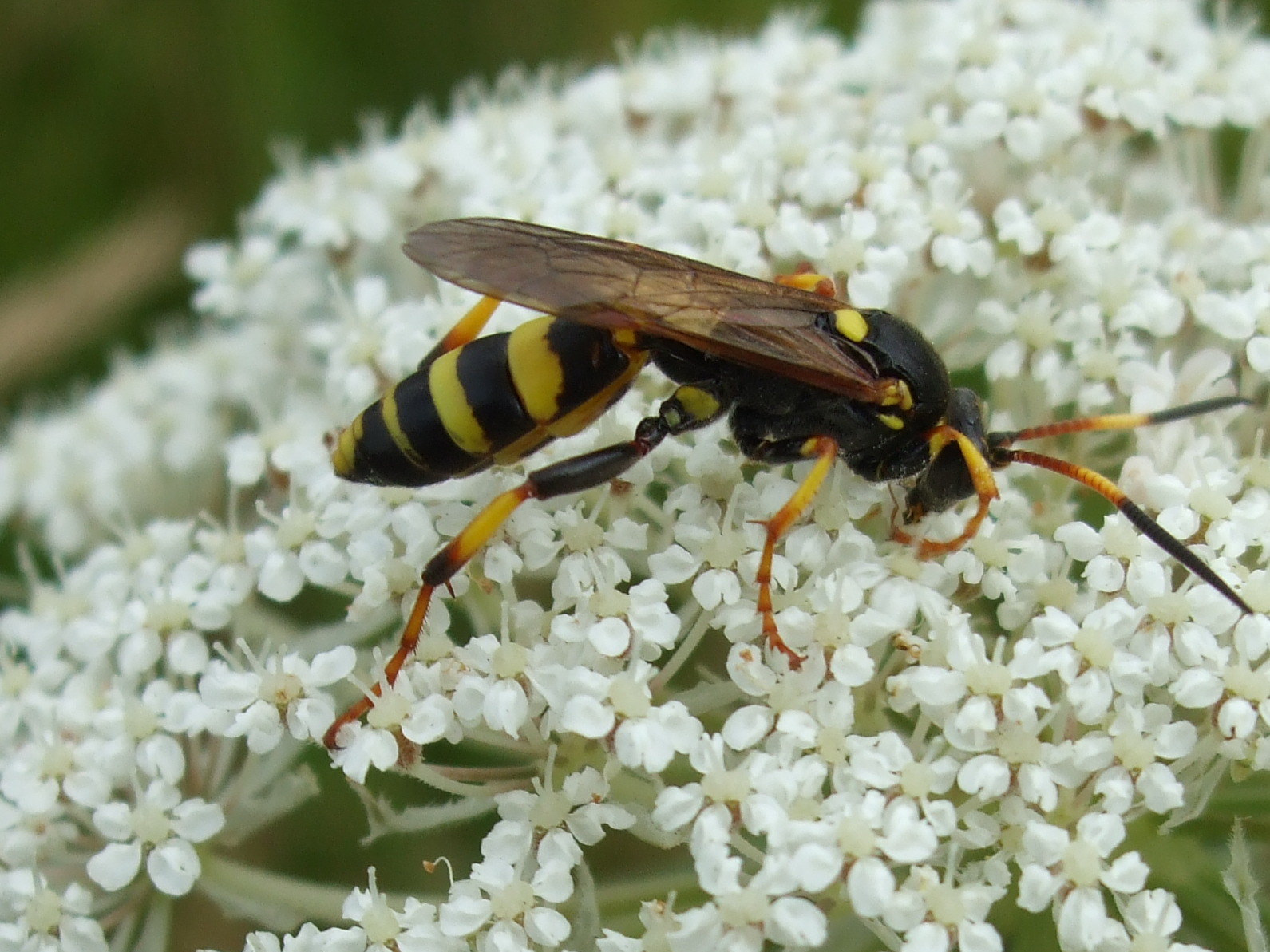
- Ichneumon xanthorius seen in Leicester, United Kingdom

Scientific classification
- Domain: Eukaryota
- Kingdom: Animalia
- Phylum: Arthropoda
- Class: Insecta
- Order: Hymenoptera
- Family: Ichneumonidae
- Genus: Ichneumon
- Species: I. xanthorius

Binomial name
- Ichneumon xanthorius Forster, 1771

= Ichneumon xanthorius =

Species of wasp

Ichneumon extensorius, commonly known as the yellow-striped Darwin wasp, is a species of wasp in the family Ichneumonidae. It is found throughout Europe. It feeds on the nectar of plants in the parsley family, and its young are parasites of the larvae of moths and butterflies. It was first described by German entomologist Georg Forster in 1771 in his work, Novæ species insectorum Centuria I.
