= Alexeter fallax =

Scientific classification
- Domain: Eukaryota
- Kingdom: Animalia
- Phylum: Arthropoda
- Class: Insecta
- Order: Hymenoptera
- Family: Ichneumonidae
- Genus: Alexeter
- Species: A. fallax

Binomial name
- Alexeter fallax (Holmgren, 1857)

Species of wasp

Alexeter fallax is a species of insect belonging to the family Ichneumonidae.

It is native to Europe.
