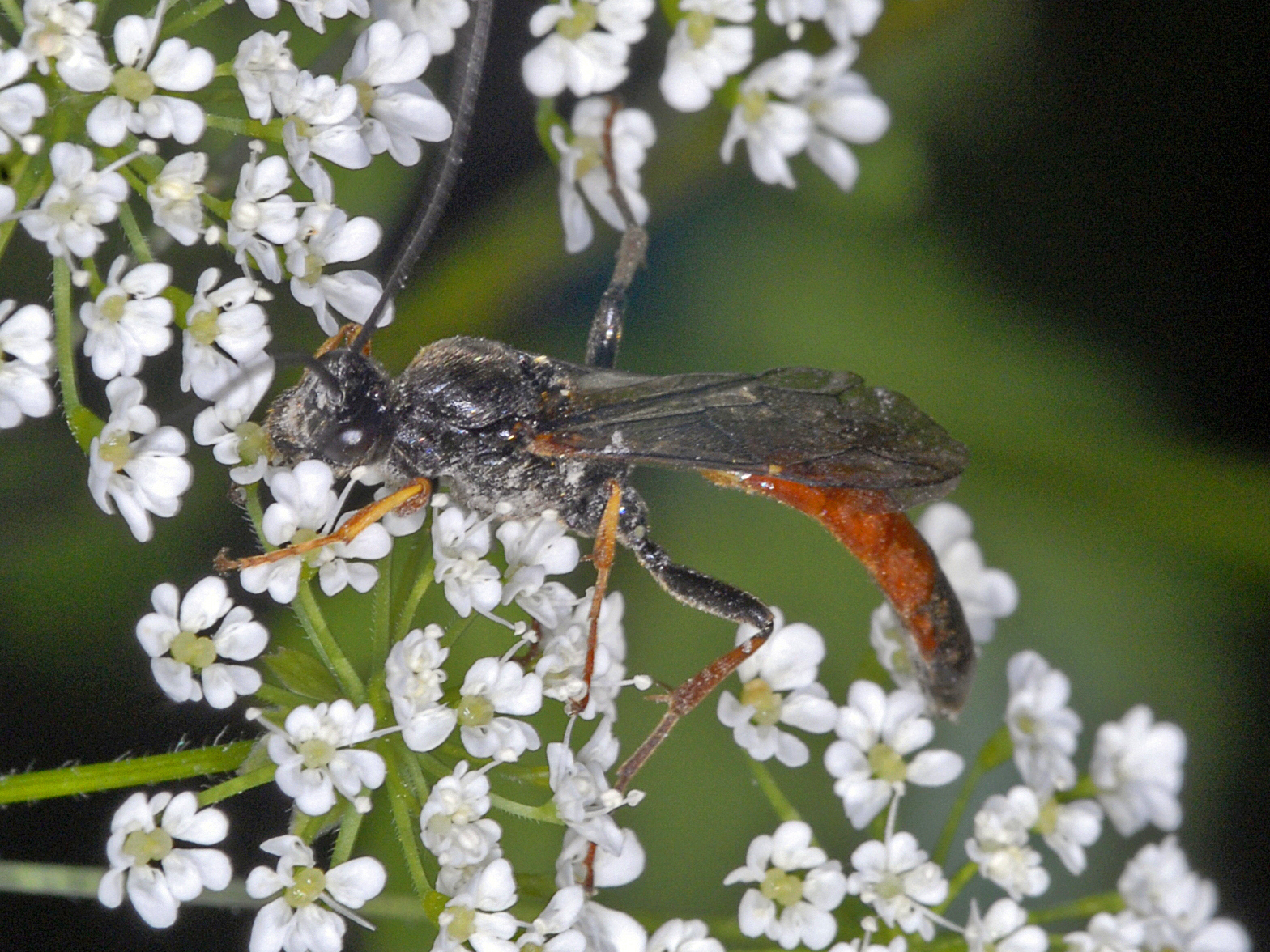
- Alomya cf. debellator

Scientific classification
- Kingdom: Animalia
- Phylum: Arthropoda
- Clade: Pancrustacea
- Class: Insecta
- Order: Hymenoptera
- Family: Ichneumonidae
- Genus: Alomya
- Species: A. debellator

Binomial name
- Alomya debellator (Fabricius 1775)

Synonyms
- Alomya debellatrix Schulz, 1906; Alomya fischeri (Schrank, 1776); Alomya nigra Gravenhorst, 1829; Alomya ovator (Fabricius, 1793); Alomya trituberculata (Gmelin, 1790); Alomya victor Curtis, 1826; Alomya victrix Schulz, 1906; Ichneumon debellator Fabricius, 1775; Ichneumon fischeri Schrank, 1776; Ichneumon ovator Fabricius, 1793

= Alomya debellator =

Species of wasp

Alomya debellator is a species of parasitoid wasp in the family Ichneumonidae. It was first described by Johan Christian Fabricius in 1775.

== Description ==
Alomya debellator can reach a length of 10.5–18 mm. The head, thorax and upper legs are black, whilst the abdomen and lower legs are mainly orange with black markings or a broad black band.

Adult wasps feed on aphid honeydew and nectar of Anthriscus sylvestris and Heracleum sphondylium. They can be found from May to September. The females of this parasitoid wasp lay their eggs into the caterpillars of moths, mainly Autographa gamma, Hepialus lupulinus and Euthrix potatoria. When they hatch, the larvae feed on their hosts.

== Distribution ==
A. debellator is present in most of Europe.

== Habitat ==
This species prefers hedgerows and meadows.
