= Diadegma consumtor =

Scientific classification
- Domain: Eukaryota
- Kingdom: Animalia
- Phylum: Arthropoda
- Class: Insecta
- Order: Hymenoptera
- Family: Ichneumonidae
- Genus: Diadegma
- Species: D. consumtor

Binomial name
- Diadegma consumtor (Gravenhorst, 1829)

Synonyms
- Diadegma alpestrator Aubert, 1971; Diadegma varians (Brischke, 1880)

Species of wasp

Diadegma consumtor is a wasp first described by Johann Ludwig Christian Gravenhorst in 1829.No subspecies are listed.
