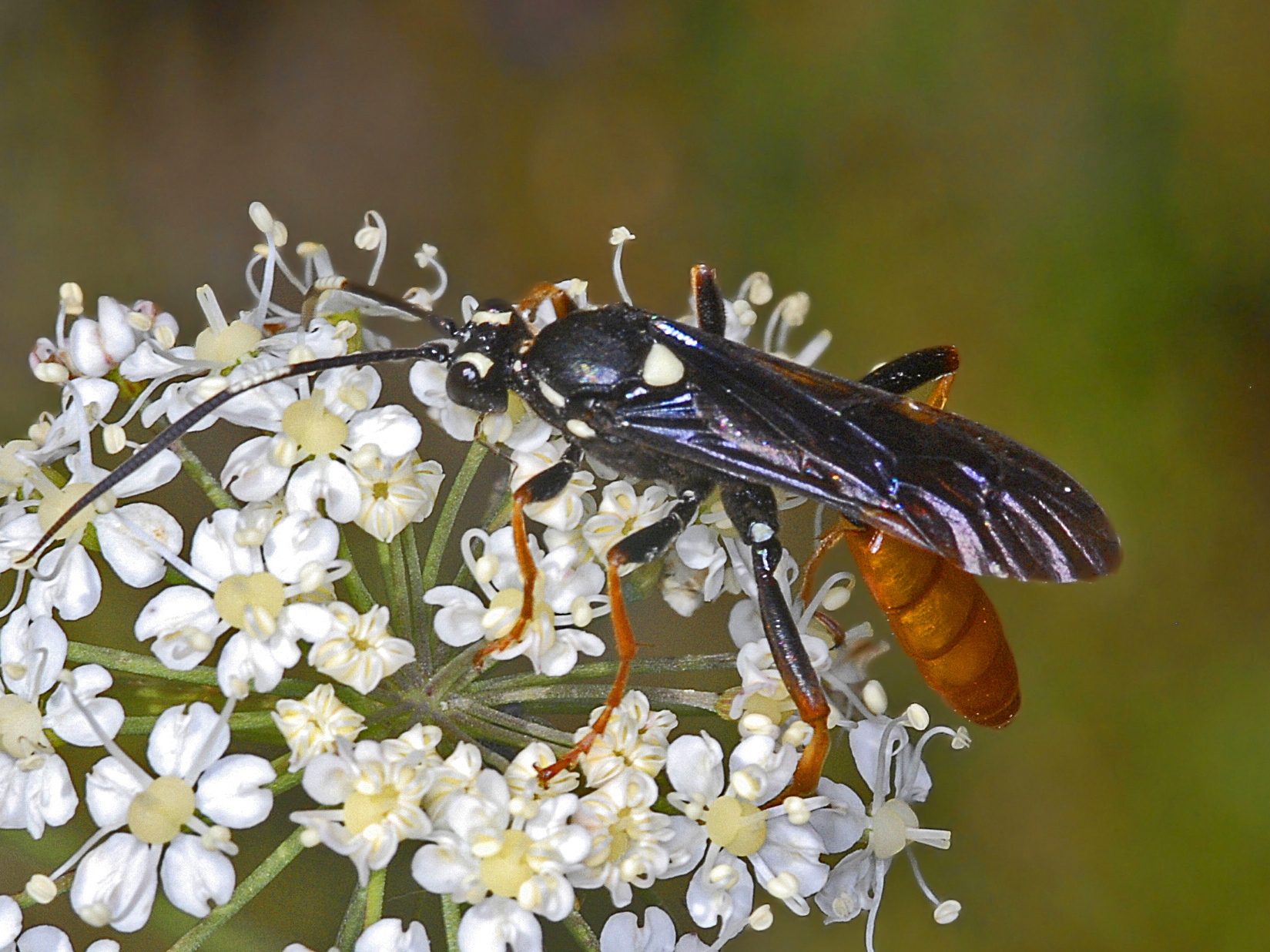

Scientific classification
- Kingdom: Animalia
- Phylum: Arthropoda
- Clade: Pancrustacea
- Class: Insecta
- Order: Hymenoptera
- Family: Ichneumonidae
- Genus: Amblyjoppa
- Species: A. fuscipennis

Binomial name
- Amblyjoppa fuscipennis (Wesmael, 1844)

Synonyms
- Amblyteles fuscipennis Wesmael, 1845; Calajoppa fuscipennis (Wesmael, 1845)

= Amblyjoppa fuscipennis =

Species of wasp

Amblyjoppa fuscipennis is a species of the parasitic wasp in the family Ichneumonidae. It was first described by Constantin Wesmael in 1844.

== Subspecies ==
- Amblyjoppa fuscipennis nigriventris (Habermehl 1917)

== Description ==
Amblyjoppa fuscipennis can reach a length of about 16–25 millimetres (0.63–0.98 in). It is a large black wasp with white spots between the eyes, a reddish abdomen, darkened wings and orange legs. The antennae of the males are completely black, while the females show a white band in the middle. These wasps can mainly be found in August.

This species looks very similar to Protichneumon pisorius, but in the genus Amblyjoppa there is a longitudinal fold only on the second abdominal sternite, while in the genus Protichneumon these abdominal sternites are often present in the second to fourth tergites.

== Distribution ==
This species is present in most of Europe (Austria; Belgium; Bulgaria; Czechoslovakia; Finland; France; Germany; Hungary; Ireland; Italy; Lithuania; Luxembourg; Netherlands; Norway; Poland; Romania; Russia; Spain; Sweden; Switzerland; United Kingdom; former Yugoslavia), in the Near East, in North Africa, and in the Oriental realm.
