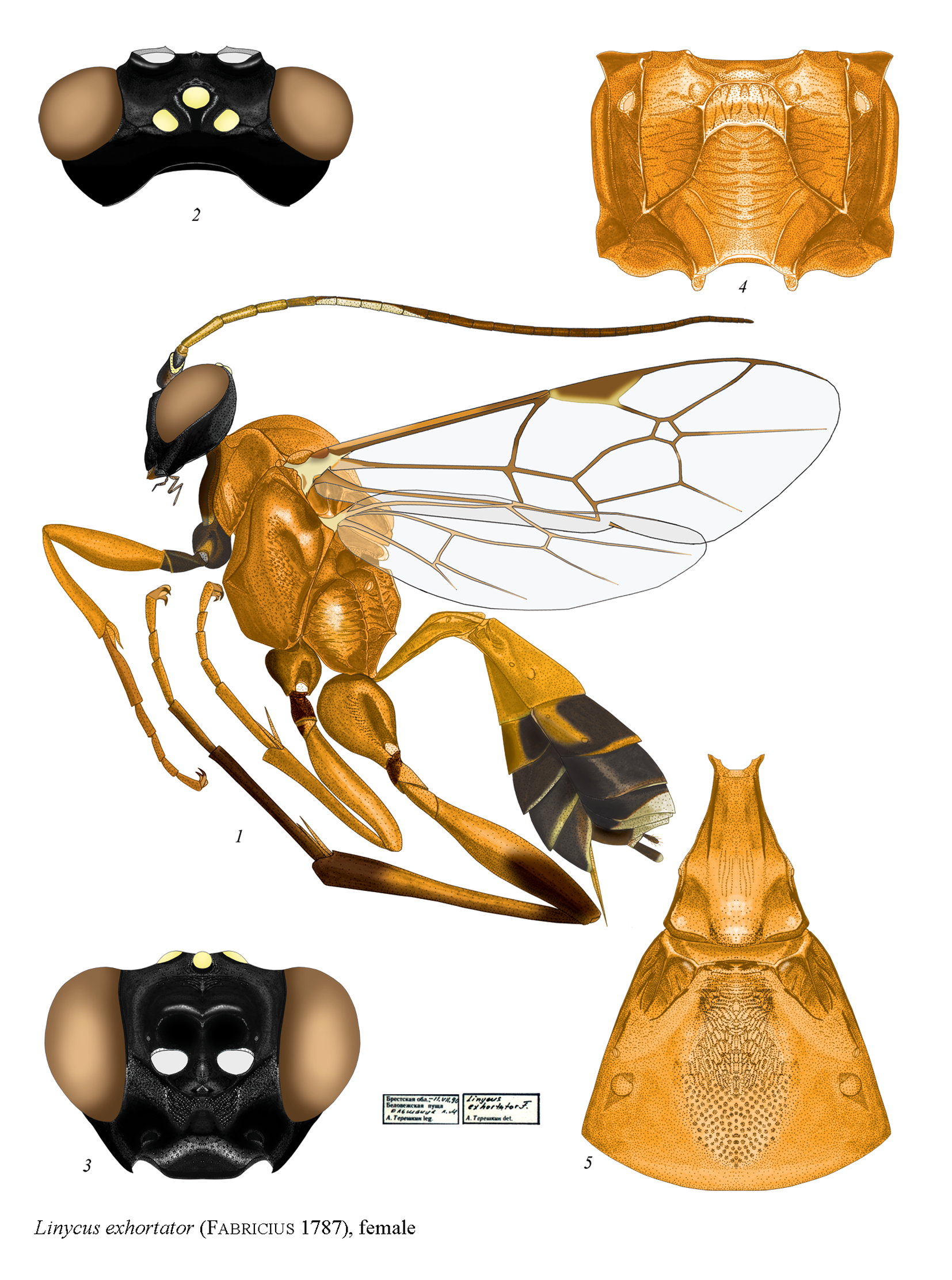

Scientific classification
- Kingdom: Animalia
- Phylum: Arthropoda
- Clade: Pancrustacea
- Class: Insecta
- Order: Hymenoptera
- Family: Ichneumonidae
- Genus: Linycus
- Species: L. exhortator

Binomial name
- Linycus exhortator (Fabricius, 1787)

= Linycus exhortator =

Species of wasp

Linycus exhortator is a species of insect belonging to the family Ichneumonidae.

It is native to Europe and North America.
