= List of Xorides species =

This is a list of 154 species in Xorides, a genus of ichneumon wasps in the family Ichneumonidae.

== Xorides species ==
- Xorides abaddon (Morley, 1913)^{c g}
- Xorides aciculatus (Benoit, 1952)^{c g}
- Xorides aculeatus Liu & Sheng, 1998^{c g}
- Xorides albimaculatus Sheng, 2000^{c g}
- Xorides albopictus (Cresson, 1870)^{c g b}
- Xorides alpestris (Habermehl, 1903)^{c g}
- Xorides amissiantennes Wang, 1997^{c g}
- Xorides annulator (Fabricius, 1804)^{c g}
- Xorides annulatus (Gravenhorst, 1829)^{c g}
- Xorides antennalis (Szepligeti, 1914)^{c}
- Xorides anthracinus Gupta & Chandra, 1974^{c g}
- Xorides armidae Gauld, 1997^{c g}
- Xorides asperus Wang & Gupta, 1995^{c g}
- Xorides ater (Gravenhorst, 1829)^{c g}
- Xorides atrox Townes, 1960^{c g}
- Xorides australiensis (Szepligeti, 1914)^{c}
- Xorides austriacus (Clement, 1938)^{c g}
- Xorides berlandi Clement, 1938^{c g}
- Xorides boharti Townes, 1960^{c g}
- Xorides brachylabis (Kriechbaumer, 1889)^{c g}
- Xorides brookei (Cameron, 1903)^{c g}
- Xorides caerulescens (Morley, 1913)^{c g}
- Xorides caeruleus (Cameron, 1905)^{c g}
- Xorides calidus (Provancher, 1886)^{c g b}
- Xorides californicus (Cresson, 1879)^{c g}
- Xorides carinifrons Baltazar, 1961^{c g}
- Xorides centromaculatus Cushman, 1933^{c g}
- Xorides cerbonei Porter, 1978^{c g}
- Xorides chalybeator (Smith, 1862)^{c g}
- Xorides cincticornis (Cresson, 1865)^{c g b}
- Xorides citrimaculatus Wang & Gupta, 1995^{c g}
- Xorides confusus Baltazar, 1961^{c g}
- Xorides corcyrensis (Kriechbaumer, 1894)^{c g}
- Xorides crassitibialis (Uchida, 1932)^{c}
- Xorides crudelis (Turner, 1919)^{c g}
- Xorides csikii Clement, 1938^{c g}
- Xorides deplanatus Sheng, 2006^{c g}
- Xorides depressus (Holmgren, 1860)^{c g}
- Xorides eastoni (Rohwer, 1913)^{c g}
- Xorides elizabethae (Bingham, 1898)^{c g}
- Xorides ephialtoides (Kriechbaumer, 1882)^{c g}
- Xorides erigentis Wang & Gupta, 1995^{c g}
- Xorides erythrothorax (Turner, 1919)^{c g}
- Xorides euthrix Porter, 1975^{c g}
- Xorides exmacularis Wang & Gupta, 1995^{c g}
- Xorides exquisitus (Tosquinet, 1903)^{c g}
- Xorides filiformis (Gravenhorst, 1829)^{c g}
- Xorides flavopictus Baltazar, 1961^{c g}
- Xorides flavotibialis Hilszczanski, 2000^{c g}
- Xorides formosanus (Sonan, 1936)^{c}
- Xorides formosulus (Kokujev, 1912)^{c g}
- Xorides fracticornis (Smith, 1860)^{c g}
- Xorides frigidus (Cresson, 1870)^{c g}
- Xorides fulgidipennis (Smith, 1858)^{c g}
- Xorides fuligator (Thunberg, 1822)^{c g}
- Xorides funiuensis Sheng, 2000^{c g}
- Xorides furcatus Liu & Sheng, 1998^{c g}
- Xorides giganticus Baltazar, 1961^{c g}
- Xorides gloriosus (Szepligeti, 1914)^{c g}
- Xorides gracilicornis (Gravenhorst, 1829)^{c g}
- Xorides gravenhorstii (Curtis, 1831)^{c g}
- Xorides harringtoni Rohwer, 1920^{c g}
- Xorides hedwigi Clement, 1938^{c g}
- Xorides hiatus Wang & Gupta, 1995^{c g}
- Xorides hingganensis Wang & Gupta, 1995^{c g}
- Xorides hirtus Liu & Sheng, 1998^{c g}
- Xorides hulstaerti (Benoit, 1952)^{c g}
- Xorides humeralis (Say, 1829)^{c g b}
- Xorides humos Gauld, 1997^{c g}
- Xorides idunae Gauld, 1997^{c g}
- Xorides ilignus Hilszczanski, 2000^{c g}
- Xorides immaculatus Cushman, 1933^{c g}
- Xorides indicatorius (Latreille, 1806)^{c g}
- Xorides indicus Gupta & Chandra, 1972^{c g}
- Xorides insularis (Cresson, 1879)^{c}
- Xorides investigator (Smith, 1874)^{c g}
- Xorides iodes Baltazar, 1961^{c g}
- Xorides irrigator (Fabricius, 1793)^{c g}
- Xorides iwatensis (Uchida, 1928)^{c g}
- Xorides jakovlevi (Kokujev, 1903)^{c g}
- Xorides jezoensis (Matsumura, 1912)^{c}
- Xorides jiyuanensis Sheng, 2004^{c g}
- Xorides karnaticus Gupta & Chandra, 1977^{c g}
- Xorides konduensis (Benoit, 1952)^{c g}
- Xorides konumensis (Uchida, 1928)^{c g}
- Xorides lambei (Handlirsch, 1911)^{c g}
- Xorides lissopunctus Gupta & Chandra, 1972^{c g}
- Xorides longicaudus Sheng & Wen, 2008^{c g}
- Xorides maculatus (Benoit, 1952)^{c g}
- Xorides maculiceps (Cameron, 1906)^{c g}
- Xorides maculipennis (Smith, 1859)^{c}
- Xorides madronensis Ruiz-Cancino & Kasparyan, 2000^{c g}
- Xorides magnificus (Mocsary, 1905)^{c g}
- Xorides maudae (Davis, 1895)^{c g}
- Xorides mayumbensis (Benoit, 1952)^{c g}
- Xorides medius Townes, 1960^{c g}
- Xorides mindanensis Baltazar, 1961^{c g}
- Xorides minimus Gupta & Chandra, 1974^{c g}
- Xorides minutus Clement, 1938^{c g}
- Xorides mirabilis (Seyrig, 1932)^{c g}
- Xorides nasensis Uchida, 1956^{c g}
- Xorides neoclyti (Rohwer, 1915)^{c g}
- Xorides niger (Pfeffer, 1913)^{c g}
- Xorides nigricaeruleus Wang & Gupta, 1995^{c g}
- Xorides nigristomus Gupta & Chandra, 1974^{c g}
- Xorides ornatus (Tosquinet, 1903)^{c}
- Xorides peniculus Townes, 1960^{c g}
- Xorides philippinensis Baltazar, 1961^{c g}
- Xorides pictus Townes, 1960^{c g}
- Xorides pissodius Sheng & Wen, 2008^{c g}
- Xorides planus Townes, 1960^{c g}
- Xorides plumicornis (Smith, 1877)^{c g}
- Xorides praecatorius (Fabricius, 1793)^{c g}
- Xorides praestans (Tosquinet, 1896)^{c g}
- Xorides propinquus (Tschek, 1869)^{c g}
- Xorides propodeum (Cushman, 1933)^{c g}
- Xorides rileyi (Ashmead, 1890)^{c g}
- Xorides rubrator Khalaim & Ruiz-Cancino, 2007^{c g}
- Xorides rudis Townes, 1960^{c g}
- Xorides ruficeps (Cameron, 1903)^{c g}
- Xorides rufipes (Gravenhorst, 1829)^{c g}
- Xorides rufipleuralis (Cushman, 1933)^{c g}
- Xorides rufomaculatus (Cameron, 1905)^{c}
- Xorides rusticus (Desvignes, 1856)^{c g}
- Xorides sapporensis (Uchida, 1928)^{c g}
- Xorides scaber (Gravenhorst, 1829)^{c g}
- Xorides secos Gauld, 1997^{c g}
- Xorides sejugatus (Brues, 1910)^{c g}
- Xorides semirufus Townes, 1960^{c g}
- Xorides sepulchralis (Holmgren, 1860)^{c g}
- Xorides serratitibia (Enderlein, 1914)^{c g}
- Xorides shevyrevi (Meyer, 1926)^{c g}
- Xorides similis (Benoit, 1952)^{c g}
- Xorides sinoxyli Sedivy, 1996^{c g}
- Xorides smithi (Schmiedeknecht, 1907)^{c g}
- Xorides spectabilis (Tosquinet, 1903)^{c g}
- Xorides splendens (Brues, 1918)^{c g}
- Xorides stepposus Kasparyan, 1981^{c g}
- Xorides stigmapterus (Say, 1824)^{c g b}
- Xorides strandi (Clement, 1938)^{c g}
- Xorides syrinx Gauld, 1997^{c g}
- Xorides tamora Gauld, 1997^{c g}
- Xorides tarsalis (Szepligeti, 1914)^{c}
- Xorides thanatos Gauld, 1997^{c g}
- Xorides tornatus (Schiodte, 1839)^{c g}
- Xorides townesi Baltazar, 1961^{c g}
- Xorides tumidus Sheng & Wen, 2008^{c g}
- Xorides tuqiangensis Sheng, 1998^{c g}
- Xorides vitalisi (Turner, 1919)^{c}
- Xorides vitiosus (Turner, 1919)^{c g}
- Xorides weii Sheng, 2002^{c g}
- Xorides wenzeli Gauld, 1997^{c g}
- Xorides xanthisma Porter, 1975^{c g}
- Xorides yamai Gauld, 1997^{c g}

Data sources: i = ITIS, c = Catalogue of Life, g = GBIF, b = Bugguide.net
