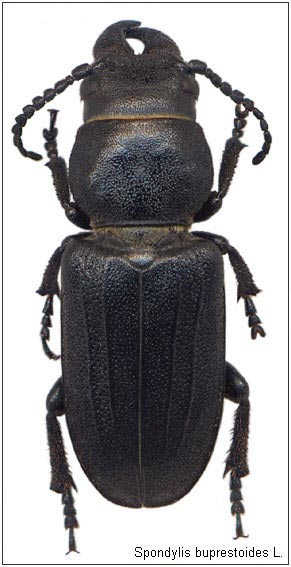
- Spondylis buprestoides

Scientific classification
- Kingdom: Animalia
- Phylum: Arthropoda
- Class: Insecta
- Order: Coleoptera
- Suborder: Polyphaga
- Infraorder: Cucujiformia
- Family: Cerambycidae
- Subfamily: Spondylidinae
- Tribe: Spondylidini; Audinet-Serville, 1832

= Spondylidini =

Tribe of beetles

Spondylidini is a tribe of beetles in the family Spondylidinae, containing the following genera and species:

- Genus Neospondylis
  - Neospondylis mexicanus (Bates, 1879)
  - Neospondylis upiformis (Mannerheim, 1843)
- Genus Scaphinus
  - Scaphinus muticus (Fabricius, 1801)
- Genus Spondylis
  - Spondylis buprestoides (Fabricius, 1775)
