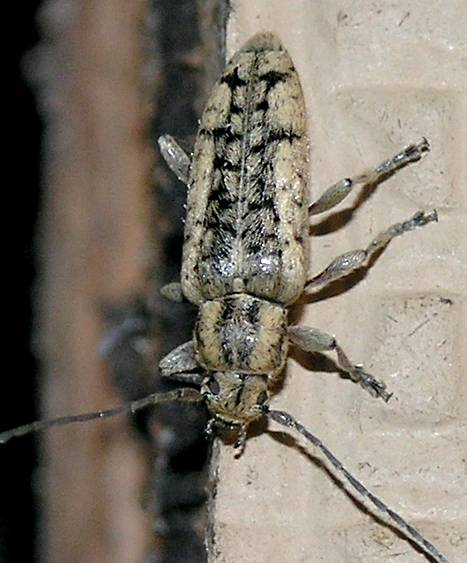
- Atimia confusa

Scientific classification
- Domain: Eukaryota
- Kingdom: Animalia
- Phylum: Arthropoda
- Class: Insecta
- Order: Coleoptera
- Suborder: Polyphaga
- Infraorder: Cucujiformia
- Family: Cerambycidae
- Subfamily: Spondylidinae
- Tribe: Atimiini; LeConte, 1873

= Atimiini =

Tribe of beetles

Atimiini is a tribe of beetles in the subfamily Spondylidinae, containing the following genera and species:

- Genus Atimia
  - Atimia confusa (Say, 1826)
  - Atimia gannoni Hovore & Giesbert, 1974
  - Atimia helenae Linsley, 1934
  - Atimia hoppingi Linsley, 1939
  - Atimia huachucae Champlain & Knull, 1922
  - Atimia mexicana Linsley, 1934
  - Atimia vandykei Linsley, 1939
- Genus Paratimia
  - Paratimia conicola Fisher, 1915
