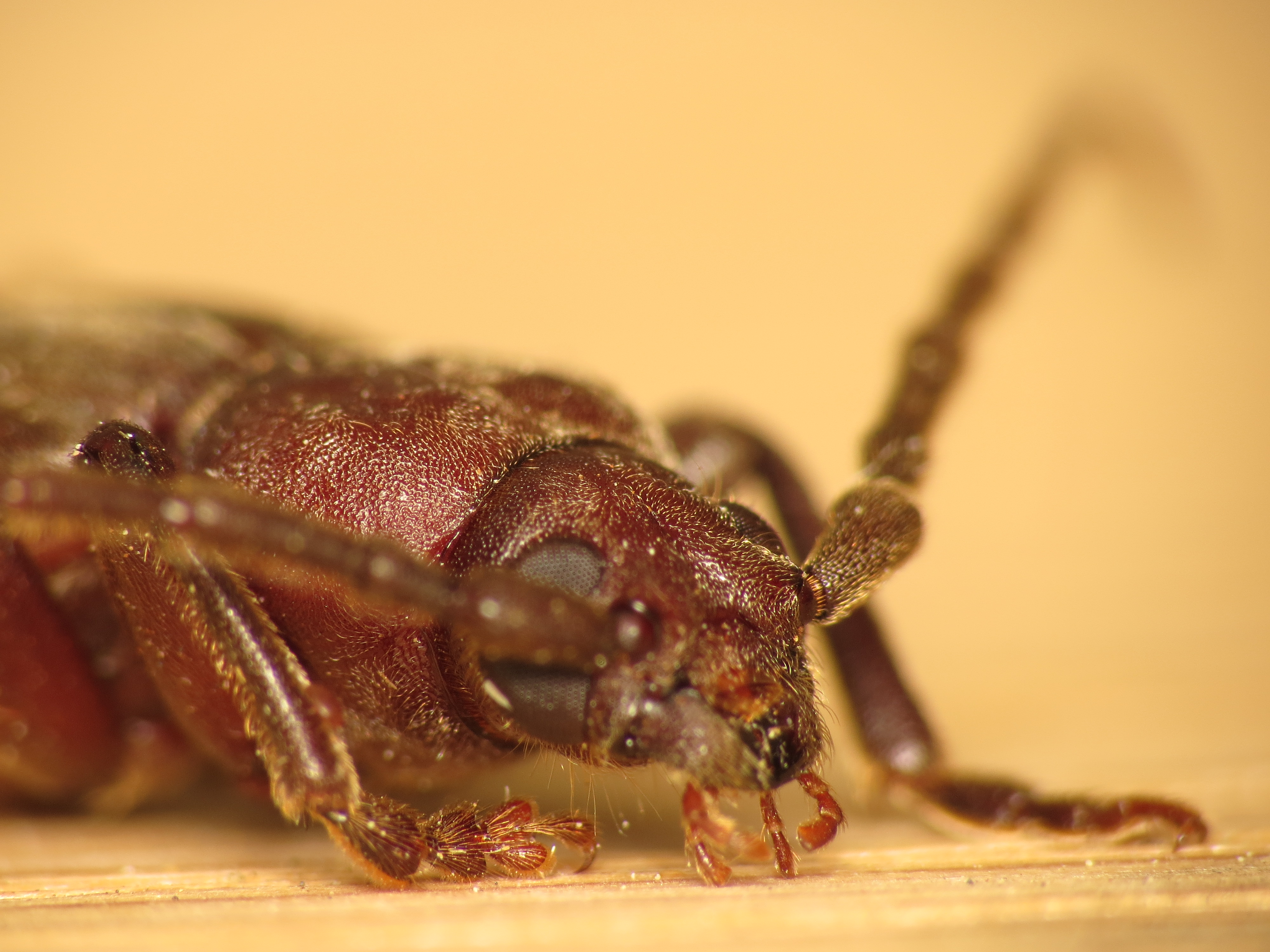
- Arhopalus rusticus

Scientific classification
- Kingdom: Animalia
- Phylum: Arthropoda
- Class: Insecta
- Order: Coleoptera
- Suborder: Polyphaga
- Infraorder: Cucujiformia
- Family: Cerambycidae
- Subfamily: Spondylidinae
- Tribe: Asemini; Thomson, 1860

= Asemini =

Tribe of beetles

Asemini is a tribe of beetles in the subfamily Spondylidinae, containing the following genera and species:

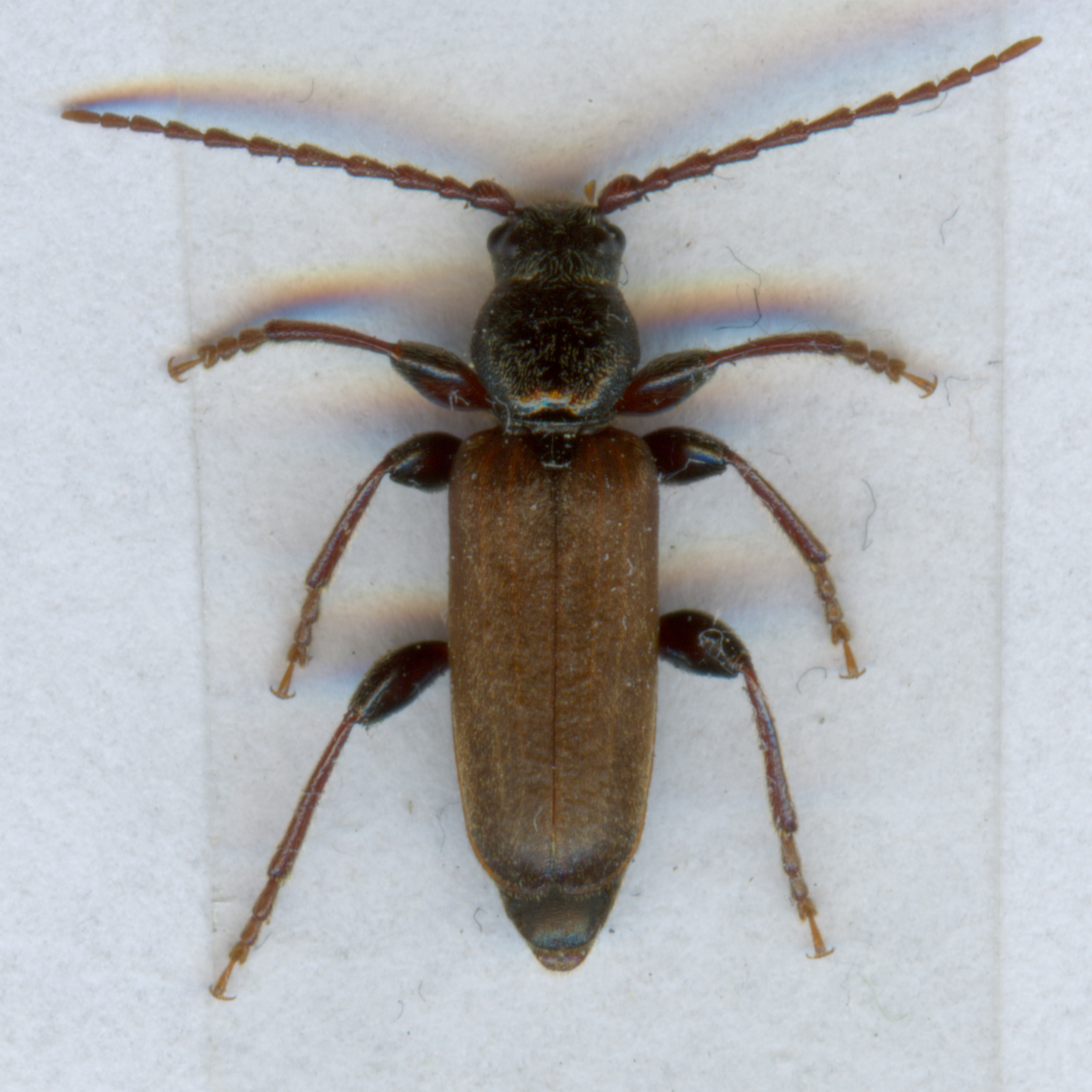
Tetropium castaneum

== Genera ==
BioLib lists:

1. Arhopalus Audinet-Serville, 1834
2. Asemum Eschscholtz, 1830
3. Atripatus Fairmaire, 1902
4. Cephalallus Sharp, 1905
5. Derolophodes Brancsik, 1898 incertae sedis
6. Hypostilbus Brancsik, 1898
7. Marocaulus Fairmaire, 1899
8. Megasemum Kraatz, 1879
9. Nothorhina L. Redtenbacher, 1845*
10. Tetropium Kirby, 1837*
11. †Palaeotetropium Vitali, 2011
- - both Nothorhina and Tetropium are sometimes placed each in their own monotypic tribes (e.g.,).

== Selected species ==
- Genus Megasemum
1. Megasemum asperum (LeConte, 1854)
2. Megasemum quadricostulatum Kraatz, 1879
