= Xorides ater =

Scientific classification
- Domain: Eukaryota
- Kingdom: Animalia
- Phylum: Arthropoda
- Class: Insecta
- Order: Hymenoptera
- Family: Ichneumonidae
- Genus: Xorides
- Species: X. ater

Binomial name
- Xorides ater (Gravenhorst, 1829)

Species of wasp

Xorides ater is a parasitoid wasp from ichneumonid family that parasitizes long-horned beetles of these species and subspecies: Tetropium castaneum, Arhopalus rusticus rusticus. Three instances of a female mating with two males simultaneously have been observed, in which "the union seemed to be satisfying all three participants". The males observed did not appear to be competing for the female.
