= Saphanini =

Scientific classification
- Domain: Eukaryota
- Kingdom: Animalia
- Phylum: Arthropoda
- Class: Insecta
- Order: Coleoptera
- Suborder: Polyphaga
- Infraorder: Cucujiformia
- Family: Cerambycidae
- Subfamily: Spondylidinae
- Tribe: Saphanini; Gistel, 1856

Tribe of beetles

Saphanini is a tribe of beetles in the subfamily Spondylidinae.

== Genera ==
- Blabinotus Wollaston, 1854

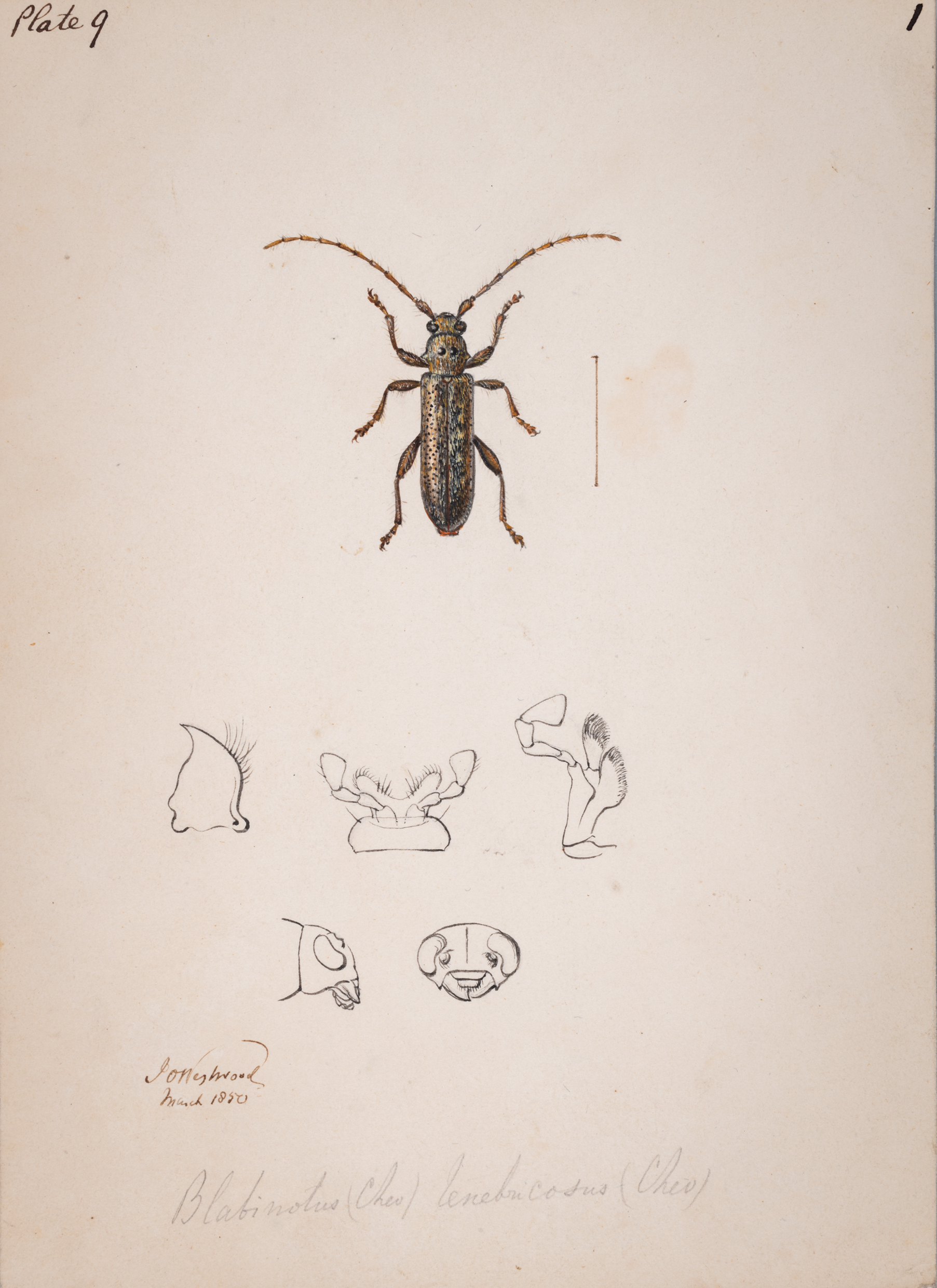
Blabinotus Spinicollis - John Obadiah Westwood - 530 1911

- Derolophodes Brancsik, 1898
- Drymochares Mulsant, 1847
- Masatopes Breuning & Villiers, 1959
- Metalocerus Aurivillius, 1913
- Michthisoma LeConte, 1850
- Opsamates Waterhouse, 1879
- Oxypleurus Mulsant, 1839
- Saphanus Audinet-Serville, 1834
- Zamium Pascoe, 1864
