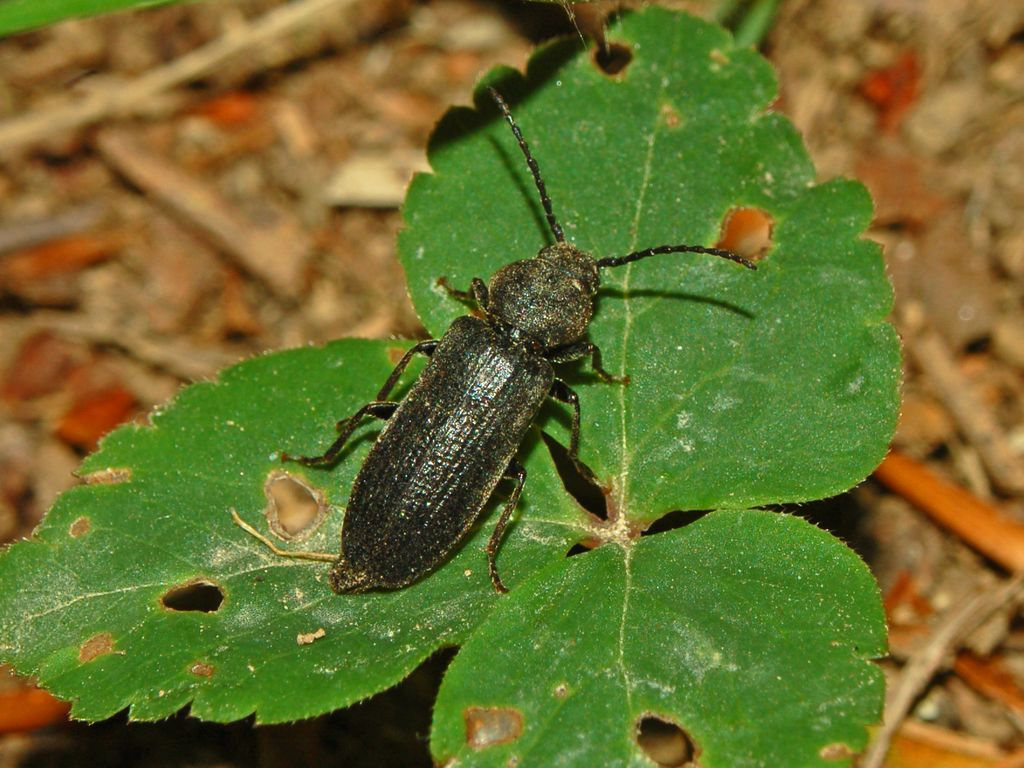

Scientific classification
- Kingdom: Animalia
- Phylum: Arthropoda
- Class: Insecta
- Order: Coleoptera
- Suborder: Polyphaga
- Infraorder: Cucujiformia
- Family: Cerambycidae
- Genus: Asemum
- Species: A. striatum

Binomial name
- Asemum striatum (Linnaeus, 1758)

Synonyms
- Asemum amputatum (Casey, 1912); Asemum amurense (Kraatz, 1879); Asemum amurense var. tomentosum (Plavilstshikov); Asemum atrum (Eschscholtz, 1830); Asemum brevicorne (Casey, 1912); Asemum carolinum (Casey, 1924 ); Asemum costulatum (Casey, 1912); Asemum curtipenne (Casey, 1912); Asemum ebenum ( Casey, 1912); Asemum fuscum (Casey, 1912)

= Asemum striatum =

Species of beetle

Asemum striatum, the black spruce borer, is a beetle species belonging to the family Cerambycidae, subfamily Spondylidinae.

This beetle is present in most of Europe, the East Palearctic realm, the Near East, Nearctic realm, and Indomalayan realm.

The adults grow up to 8–23 millimetres (0.31–0.91 in) and can be encountered from May through August, completing their life cycle in two to three years. Head and pronotum are usually black, while elytrae are black or brownish, with various longitudinal ridges (hence the specific name).

They are polyphagous in coniferous trees (mainly feeding on Pinus sylvestris, Pinus mugo and Pinus nigra, but also on Picea abies and Abies or Larix species). Larvae develop under bark of host plants, later in dead branches and stumps of trees.
