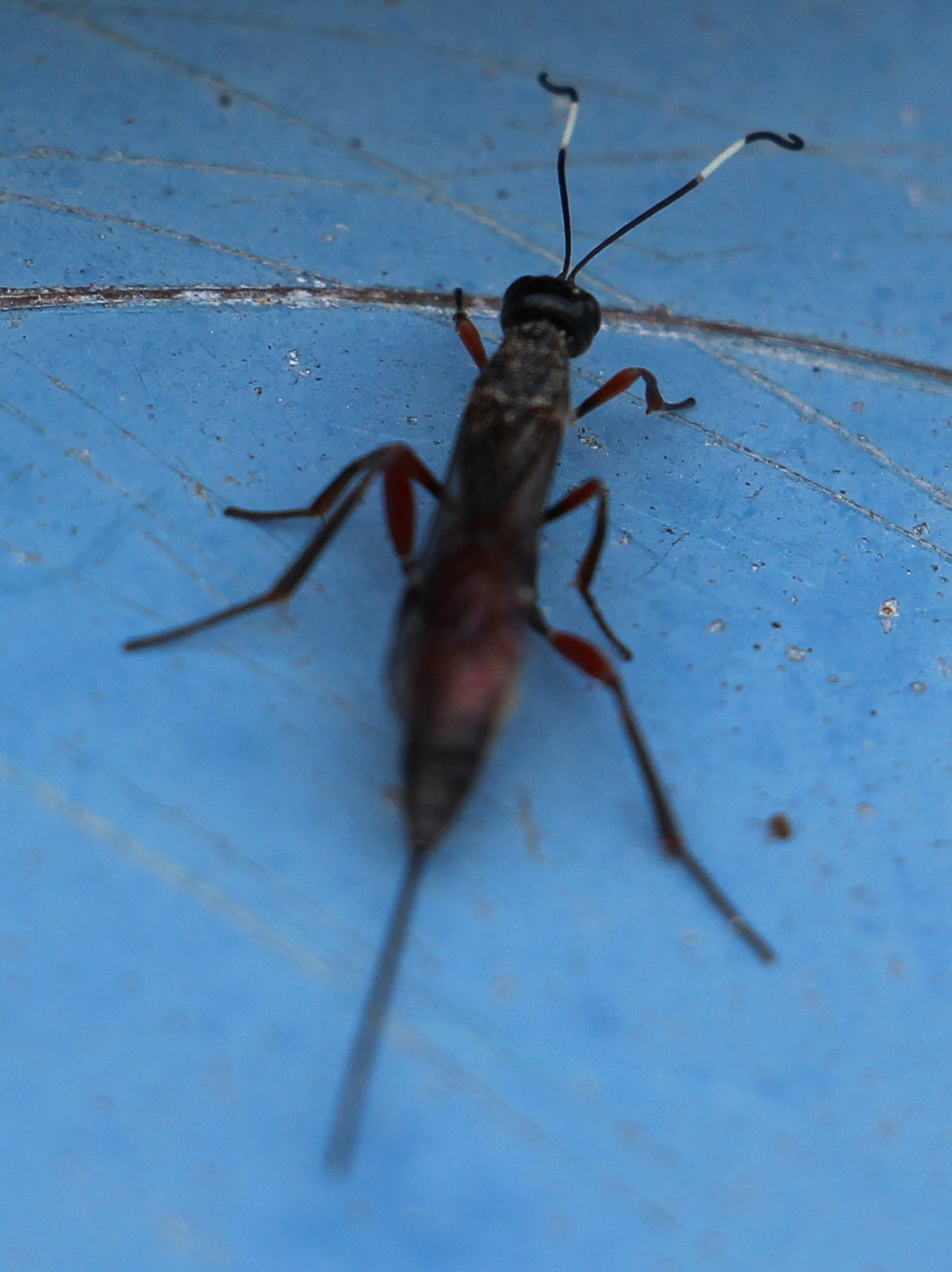

Scientific classification
- Domain: Eukaryota
- Kingdom: Animalia
- Phylum: Arthropoda
- Class: Insecta
- Order: Hymenoptera
- Family: Ichneumonidae
- Genus: Xorides
- Species: X. rufipes

Binomial name
- Xorides rufipes (Gravenhorst, 1829)

= Xorides rufipes =

Species of wasp

Xorides rufipes is a parasitoid wasp from the family Ichneumonidae that parasitizes longhorn beetle of the subspecies Rhagium inquisitor inquisitor.
