= Michthisoma =

Scientific classification
- Kingdom: Animalia
- Phylum: Arthropoda
- Class: Insecta
- Order: Coleoptera
- Suborder: Polyphaga
- Infraorder: Cucujiformia
- Family: Cerambycidae
- Subfamily: Spondylidinae
- Tribe: Saphanini
- Genus: Michthisoma; LeConte, 1850
- Species: M. heterodoxum

Binomial name
- Michthisoma heterodoxum LeConte, 1850

Genus of beetles

Michthisoma is a genus of long-horned beetles in the family Cerambycidae, containing a single described species, Michthisoma heterodoxum. It is a micropterous insect.
