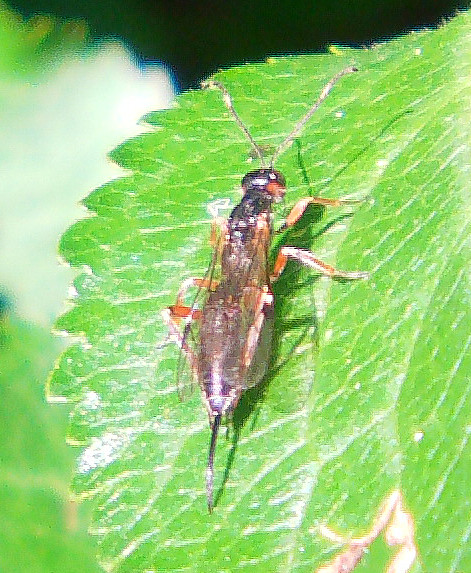

Scientific classification
- Domain: Eukaryota
- Kingdom: Animalia
- Phylum: Arthropoda
- Class: Insecta
- Order: Hymenoptera
- Family: Ichneumonidae
- Genus: Xorides
- Species: X. praecatorius

Binomial name
- Xorides praecatorius (Fabricius, 1793)

= Xorides praecatorius =

Species of wasp

Xorides praecatorius is a parasitoid wasp from ichneumonid family that parasitizes many long-horned beetles of the following species: Tetropium castaneum, Tetropium fuscum, Aromia moschata, Callidium aeneum Callidium violaceum, and some other.
