= Spondylinae =

Spondylinae may refer to:

- Spondylinae, a monogeneric subfamily of bivalves containing only the genus Spondylus
- Spondylidinae, a subfamily of beetles, sometimes called Spondylinae
