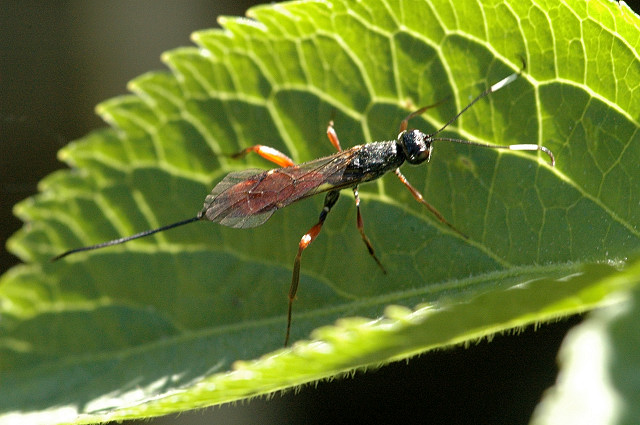

Scientific classification
- Kingdom: Animalia
- Phylum: Arthropoda
- Clade: Pancrustacea
- Class: Insecta
- Order: Hymenoptera
- Family: Ichneumonidae
- Genus: Xorides
- Species: X. fuligator

Binomial name
- Xorides fuligator (Thunberg, 1824)

= Xorides fuligator =

Species of wasp

Xorides fuligator is a parasitoid wasp from Ichneumonid family that parasitizes long-horned beetle of subspecies Arhopalus rusticus rusticus.
