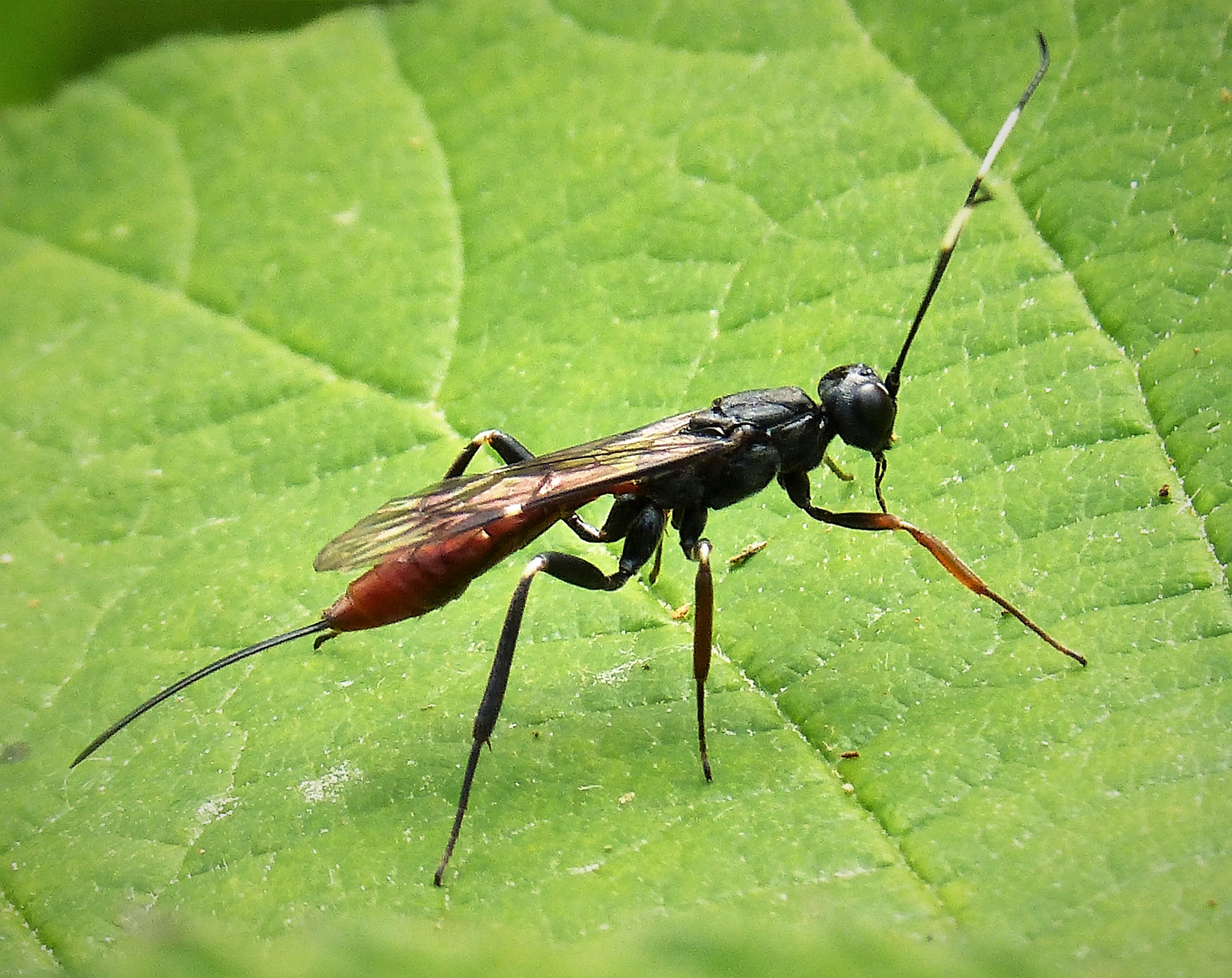

Scientific classification
- Domain: Eukaryota
- Kingdom: Animalia
- Phylum: Arthropoda
- Class: Insecta
- Order: Hymenoptera
- Family: Ichneumonidae
- Genus: Xorides
- Species: X. filiformis

Binomial name
- Xorides filiformis (Gravenhorst, 1829)

= Xorides filiformis =

Species of wasp

Xorides filiformis is a parasitoid wasp in the family Ichneumonidae that parasitizes the long-horned beetle species Ergates faber.
