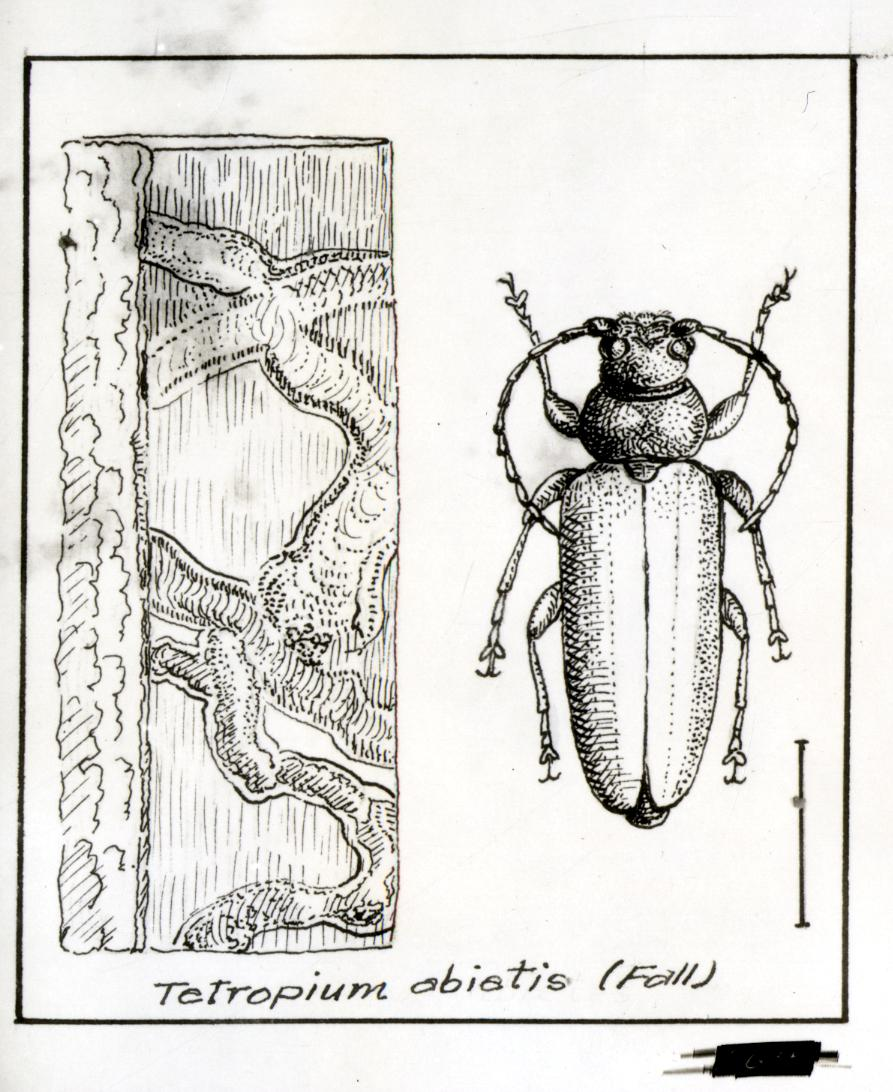

Scientific classification
- Kingdom: Animalia
- Phylum: Arthropoda
- Class: Insecta
- Order: Coleoptera
- Suborder: Polyphaga
- Infraorder: Cucujiformia
- Family: Cerambycidae
- Genus: Tetropium
- Species: T. abietis

Binomial name
- Tetropium abietis Fall, 1912

= Tetropium abietis =

Species of beetle

Tetropium abietis is a species of beetle in the family Cerambycidae. It was described by Fall in 1912.
