= Tetropium guatemalanum =

Scientific classification
- Kingdom: Animalia
- Phylum: Arthropoda
- Class: Insecta
- Order: Coleoptera
- Suborder: Polyphaga
- Infraorder: Cucujiformia
- Family: Cerambycidae
- Genus: Tetropium
- Species: T. guatemalanum

Binomial name
- Tetropium guatemalanum Bates, 1892

Species of beetle

Tetropium guatemalanum is a species of beetle in the family Cerambycidae. It was described by Henry Walter Bates in 1892.
