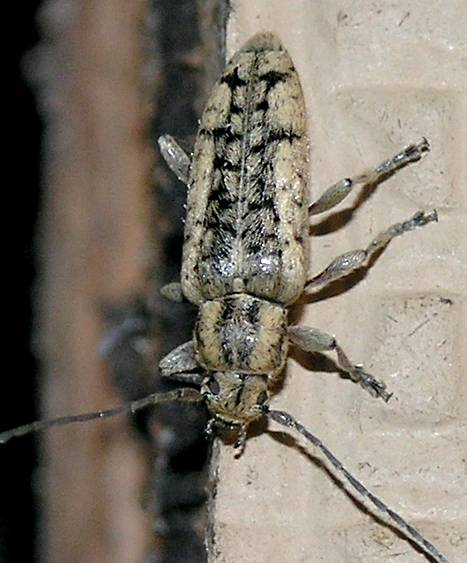
- Atimia confusa

Scientific classification
- Domain: Eukaryota
- Kingdom: Animalia
- Phylum: Arthropoda
- Class: Insecta
- Order: Coleoptera
- Suborder: Polyphaga
- Infraorder: Cucujiformia
- Family: Cerambycidae
- Tribe: Atimiini
- Genus: Atimia; Haldeman, 1847

= Atimia (beetle) =

Genus of beetles

Atimia is a genus of long-horned beetles in the family Cerambycidae. There are about 13 described species in Atimia.

== Species ==
These 13 species belong to the genus Atimia:

- Atimia chinensis Linsley, 1939^{c g}
- Atimia confusa (Say, 1826)^{i c g b} (small cedar borer)
- Atimia esakii Hayashi, 1974^{c g}
- Atimia gannoni Hovore and Giesbert, 1974^{i c g}
- Atimia helenae Linsley, 1934^{i c g}
- Atimia hoppingi Linsley, 1939^{i c g}
- Atimia huachucae Champlain & Knull, 1922^{i c g b}
- Atimia juniperi Holzschuh, 1984^{c g}
- Atimia maculipuncta (Semenov & Plavilstshikov, 1937)^{c g}
- Atimia mexicana Linsley, 1934^{c g}
- Atimia okayamensis Hayashi, 1972^{c g}
- Atimia truncatella Holzschuh, 2007^{c g}
- Atimia vandykei Linsley, 1939^{i c g}

Data sources: i = ITIS, c = Catalogue of Life, g = GBIF, b = Bugguide.net
