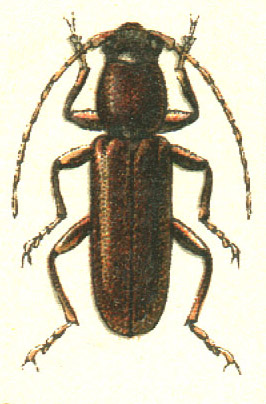
- Nothorhina punctata

Scientific classification
- Kingdom: Animalia
- Phylum: Arthropoda
- Clade: Pancrustacea
- Class: Insecta
- Order: Coleoptera
- Suborder: Polyphaga
- Infraorder: Cucujiformia
- Family: Cerambycidae
- Genus: Nothorhina
- Species: N. punctata

Binomial name
- Nothorhina punctata (Fabricius, 1798)

Synonyms
- Callidium punctatum Fabricius, 1798; Callidium muricatum Dalman, 1817; Callidium scabricolle Redtenbacher, 1842; Nothorhina muricata (Dalman, 1817)

= Nothorhina punctata =

Species of beetle

Nothorhina punctata is a wood-boring species of beetle belonging to the family Cerambycidae. Due to an erroneous interpretation of the historical literature, this species incorrectly appears under the name Nothorhina muricata in many sources.

This species is native to Europe and other areas where its preferred host plant (Pinus sylvestris) occurs, but has been reported in other countries, such as Japan and South Korea.
