= Xorides irrigator =

Scientific classification
- Kingdom: Animalia
- Phylum: Arthropoda
- Clade: Pancrustacea
- Class: Insecta
- Order: Hymenoptera
- Family: Ichneumonidae
- Genus: Xorides
- Species: X. irrigator

Binomial name
- Xorides irrigator (Fabricius, 1793)

Species of wasp

Xorides irrigator is a parasitoid wasp from ichneumonid family that parasitizes the longhorn beetle Rhagium inquisitor inquisitor.
