= Arhopalus foveicollis =

Scientific classification
- Domain: Eukaryota
- Kingdom: Animalia
- Phylum: Arthropoda
- Class: Insecta
- Order: Coleoptera
- Suborder: Polyphaga
- Infraorder: Cucujiformia
- Family: Cerambycidae
- Genus: Arhopalus
- Species: A. foveicollis

Binomial name
- Arhopalus foveicollis (Haldeman, 1847)

Species of beetle

Arhopalus foveicollis is a species of beetle in the family Cerambycidae. It was described by Haldeman in 1847.
