= Tetropium velutinum =

Scientific classification
- Kingdom: Animalia
- Phylum: Arthropoda
- Class: Insecta
- Order: Coleoptera
- Suborder: Polyphaga
- Infraorder: Cucujiformia
- Family: Cerambycidae
- Genus: Tetropium
- Species: T. velutinum

Binomial name
- Tetropium velutinum LeConte, 1869

Species of beetle

Tetropium velutinum is a species of beetle in the family Cerambycidae. It was described by John Lawrence LeConte in 1869.
