= Xorides corcyrensis =

Scientific classification
- Domain: Eukaryota
- Kingdom: Animalia
- Phylum: Arthropoda
- Class: Insecta
- Order: Hymenoptera
- Family: Ichneumonidae
- Genus: Xorides
- Species: X. corcyrensis

Binomial name
- Xorides corcyrensis (Kriechbaumer, 1894)

Species of wasp

Xorides corcyrensis is a parasitoid wasp from ichneumonid family that parasitizes long-horned beetles of the Ropalopus varini.
