= Arhopalus asperatus =

Scientific classification
- Domain: Eukaryota
- Kingdom: Animalia
- Phylum: Arthropoda
- Class: Insecta
- Order: Coleoptera
- Suborder: Polyphaga
- Infraorder: Cucujiformia
- Family: Cerambycidae
- Genus: Arhopalus
- Species: A. asperatus

Binomial name
- Arhopalus asperatus (LeConte, 1859)

Species of beetle

Arhopalus asperatus is a species of beetle in the family Cerambycidae. It was described by John Lawrence LeConte in 1859.

The beetles vary from 18 to 33 mm in length, and have antennae of around 50% to 75% of the body length.
