= Paratimia =

Scientific classification
- Domain: Eukaryota
- Kingdom: Animalia
- Phylum: Arthropoda
- Class: Insecta
- Order: Coleoptera
- Suborder: Polyphaga
- Infraorder: Cucujiformia
- Family: Cerambycidae
- Tribe: Atimiini
- Genus: Paratimia; Fisher, 1915

Genus of beetles

Paratimia is a genus of long-horned beetles in the family Cerambycidae. There is one described species in Paratimia, P. conicola.
