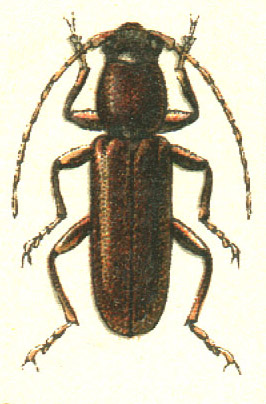
- Nothorhina punctata

Scientific classification
- Domain: Eukaryota
- Kingdom: Animalia
- Phylum: Arthropoda
- Class: Insecta
- Order: Coleoptera
- Suborder: Polyphaga
- Infraorder: Cucujiformia
- Family: Cerambycidae
- Subfamily: Spondylidinae
- Tribe: Asemini
- Genus: Nothorhina; Redtenbacher, 1845

Synonyms
- Nothorrhina Gemminger & Harold, 1873 (Unj. Emend.); Notorrhina Sherborn, 1928 (Missp.); Palaeoasemum Abdullah, 1967

= Nothorhina =

Genus of beetles

Nothorhina is a genus of beetles belonging to the family Cerambycidae. The genus is sometimes classified in its own monotypic tribe, Nothorhinini.

The species of this genus are Palaearctic in distribution.

== Extant species ==
- Nothorhina gardneri Plavilstshikov, 1934
- Nothorhina punctata (Fabricius, 1798)

== Extinct species ==
- ↑Nothorhina granulicollis Zang, 1905
