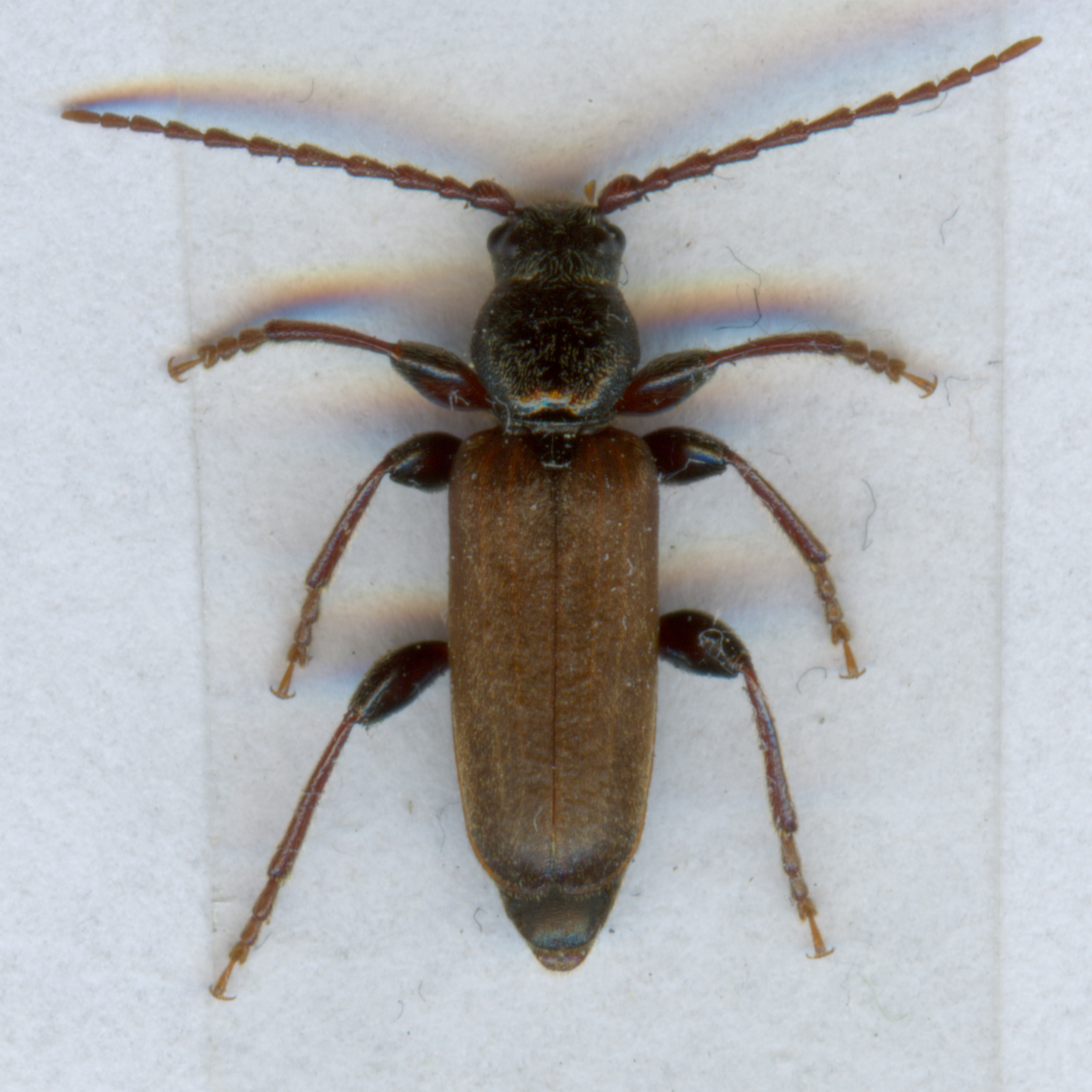
- Tetropium castaneum

Scientific classification
- Kingdom: Animalia
- Phylum: Arthropoda
- Class: Insecta
- Order: Coleoptera
- Suborder: Polyphaga
- Infraorder: Cucujiformia
- Family: Cerambycidae
- Subfamily: Spondylidinae
- Tribe: Asemini
- Genus: Tetropium; Kirby in Richardson, 1837

Synonyms
- Criomorphus Mulsant, 1839; Isarthrum Agassiz, 1846

= Tetropium =

Genus of beetles

Tetropium is a genus of long-horned beetles in the family Cerambycidae. There are at least 20 described species in Tetropium. The genus is sometimes classified in its own monotypic tribe, Tetropiini.

== Species ==
These 27 species belong to the genus Tetropium:

- Tetropium abietis Fall, 1912^{i c g b} (roundheaded fir borer)
- Tetropium aquilonium Plavilstshikov, 1940^{c g}
- Tetropium auripilis Bates, 1885^{i c g}
- Tetropium beckeri Franz, 1955^{c g}
- Tetropium castaneum (Linnaeus, 1758)^{i c g}
- Tetropium cinnamopterum Kirby in Richardson, 1837^{i c g}
- Tetropium confragosum Holzschuh, 1981^{c g}
- Tetropium danilevskyi Sláma, 2005^{c g}
- Tetropium fuscum (Fabricius, 1787)^{c g b} (brown spruce longhorn beetle)
- Tetropium gabrieli Weise, 1905^{c g}
- Tetropium gracilicorne Reitter, 1889^{c g}
- Tetropium gracilicum Hayashi, 1983^{c g}
- Tetropium guatemalanum Bates, 1892^{c g}
- Tetropium laticolle Podaný, 1967^{c g}
- Tetropium morishimaorum Kusama & Takakuwa, 1984^{c g}
- Tetropium opacipenne Bates, 1885^{c g}
- Tetropium opacum Franz, 1955^{c g}
- Tetropium oreinum Gahan, 1906^{c g}
- Tetropium parallelum Casey, 1891^{c g}
- Tetropium parvulum Casey, 1891^{i c g b} (northern spruce borer)
- Tetropium pilosicorne Linsley, 1935^{c g}
- Tetropium scabriculum Holzschuh, 1993^{c g}
- Tetropium schwarzianum Casey, 1891^{i c g b}
- Tetropium schwerdtfegeri Franz, 1955^{c g}
- Tetropium staudingeri Pic, 1901^{c g}
- Tetropium tauricum Shapovalov, 2007^{c g}
- Tetropium velutinum LeConte, 1869^{i c g b} (western larch borer)

Data sources: i = ITIS, c = Catalogue of Life, g = GBIF, b = Bugguide.net

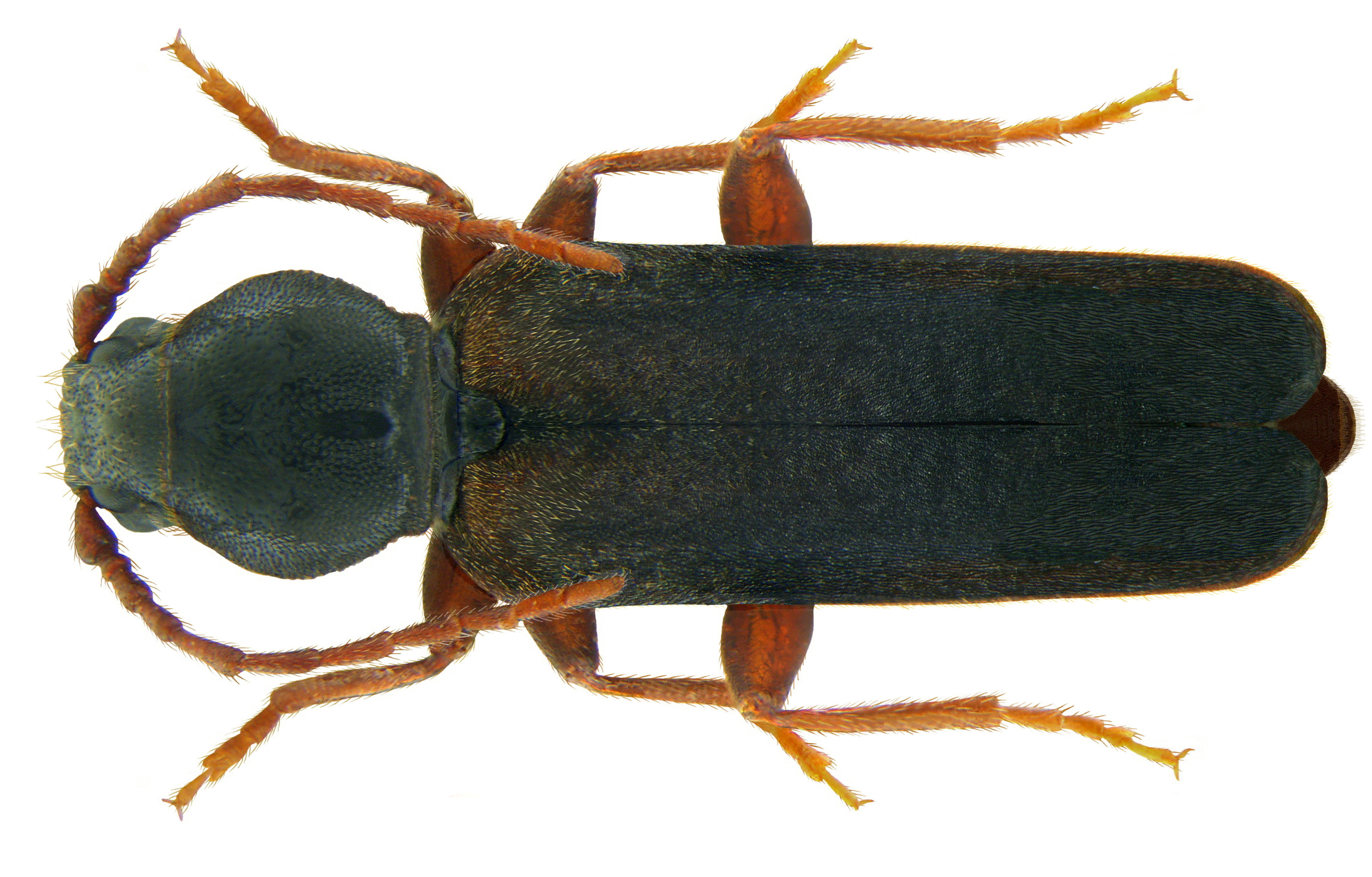
Tetropium gabrieli
