= Asemum nitidum =

- Asemum nitidum found in Contra Costa, California

Scientific classification
- Kingdom: Animalia
- Phylum: Arthropoda
- Clade: Pancrustacea
- Class: Insecta
- Order: Coleoptera
- Suborder: Polyphaga
- Infraorder: Cucujiformia
- Family: Cerambycidae
- Genus: Asemum
- Species: A. nitidum

Binomial name
- Asemum nitidum LeConte, 1873

Species of beetle

Asemum nitidum is a species of beetle in the family Cerambycidae native to some parts of North America. It was described by John Lawrence LeConte in 1873.
