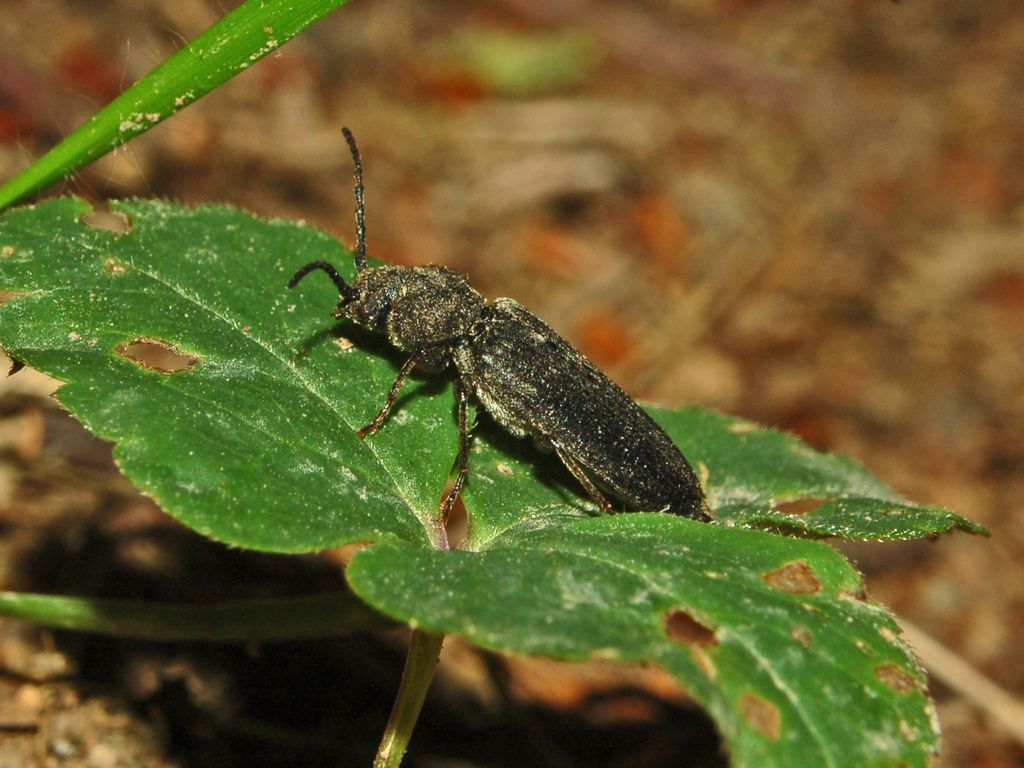
- Asemum striatum

Scientific classification
- Domain: Eukaryota
- Kingdom: Animalia
- Phylum: Arthropoda
- Class: Insecta
- Order: Coleoptera
- Suborder: Polyphaga
- Infraorder: Cucujiformia
- Family: Cerambycidae
- Subfamily: Spondylidinae
- Tribe: Asemini
- Genus: Asemum; Eschscholtz, 1830

Synonyms
- Liasemum Casey, 1912

= Asemum =

Genus of beetles

Asemum is a genus of longhorn beetles in the family Cerambycidae, described by Johann Friedrich von Eschscholtz in 1830.

== Species ==
- Asemum australe LeConte, 1850
- Asemum caseyi Linsley, 1957
- Asemum glabrellum Bates, 1892
- Asemum lucidulum Pesarini & Sabbadini, 1997
- Asemum nitidum LeConte, 1873
- Asemum punctulatum Blessig, 1872
- Asemum striatum (Linnaeus, 1758)- Black Spruce Borer
- Asemum tenuicorne Kraatz, 1879
