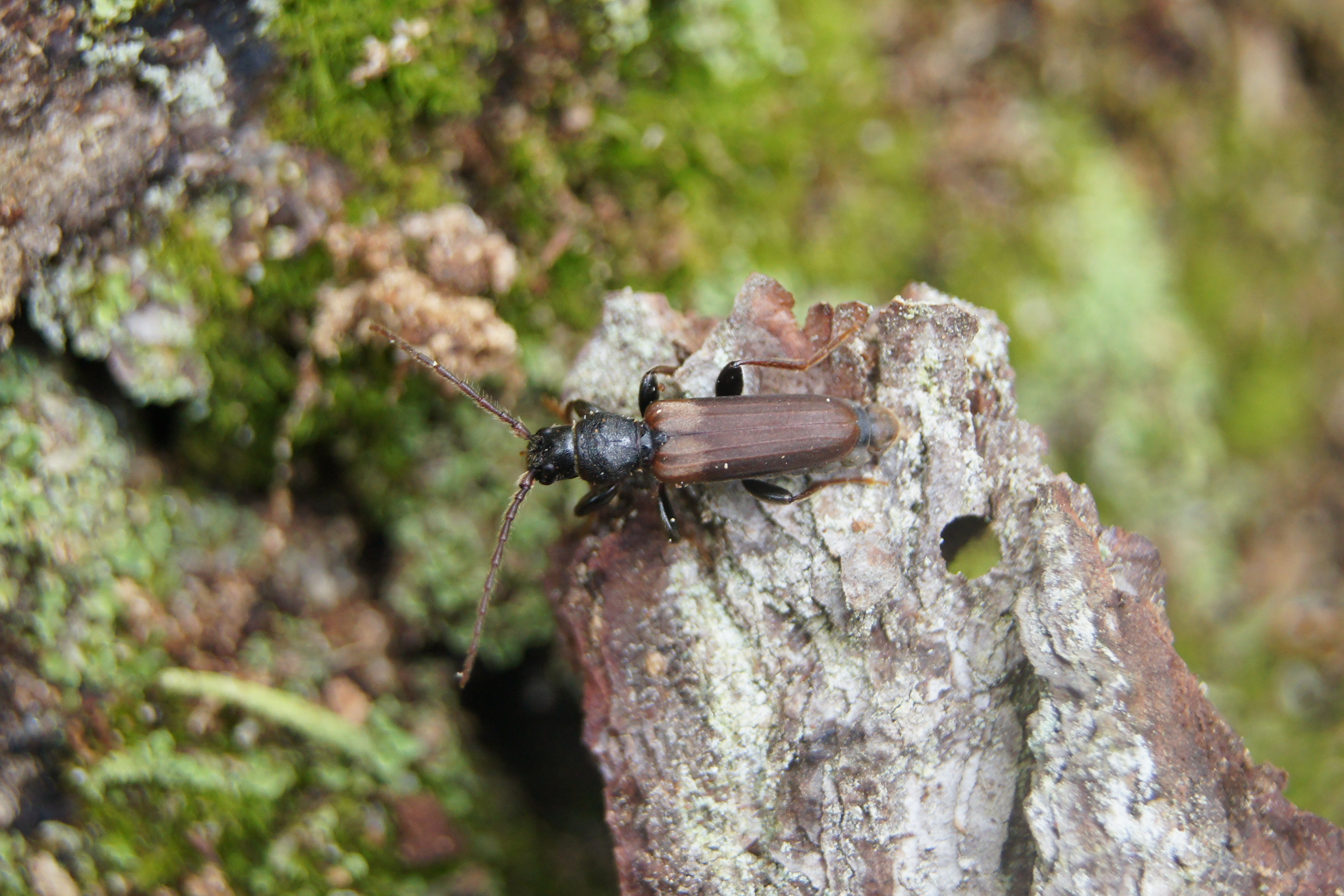

Scientific classification
- Kingdom: Animalia
- Phylum: Arthropoda
- Clade: Pancrustacea
- Class: Insecta
- Order: Coleoptera
- Suborder: Polyphaga
- Infraorder: Cucujiformia
- Family: Cerambycidae
- Genus: Tetropium
- Species: T. fuscum

Binomial name
- Tetropium fuscum (Fabricius, 1787)

= Tetropium fuscum =

Species of beetle

Tetropium fuscum, the brown spruce longhorn beetle, is a species of beetle in the family Cerambycidae. It was described by Johan Christian Fabricius in 1787. Tetropium fuscum is native to Europe and Northern Asia, and has been introduced to Nova Scotia, Canada. Brown spruce longhorn is a pest of spruce trees.

== Distribution ==
Brown spruce longhorn beetle is native to Continental Europe and parts of Asia has been recorded in the following countries: Austria, Belarus, Belgium, Bosnia-Herzegovina, Bulgaria, Croatia, Czech Republic, Denmark, Estonia, Finland, France, Germany, Hungary, Italy, Japan, Kazakhstan, Latvia, Lithuania, Moldova, Montenegro, Netherlands, Norway, Poland, Romania, Russia, Serbia, Slovakia, Slovenia, Sweden, Switzerland Turkey and Ukraine

Brown spruce longhorn beetle was found breeding in Rannoch Forest in Scotland in 2015, the first record of this species in Great Britain. The beetle was later identified at two other sites in Scotland, and there are also scattered reports from England. The collection of insects at the Hunterian Museum was reviewed, and a brown spruce longhorn beetle collected in Roslin in 1986 was discovered. Potentially brown spruce longhorn beetle may have been breeding in the UK for thirty years or more.

Brown spruce longhorn beetle is an invasive species in Canada. It was first identified in 1999 in Point Pleasant Park, Halifax, Nova Scotia. A review of specimens collected in the park in 1990 found that those labelled as the native species Tetropium cinnamopterum were Tetropium fuscum. A single adult brown spruce longhorn was found in a trap in Westmorland County, New Brunswick. Brown spruce longhorn beetle was probably introduced to Nova Scotia on wood packaging material imported into the Port of Halifax.

== Lifecycle ==
The larvae of brown spruce longhorn beetle are woodboring. Larvae of this beetle have been recorded infesting several different species of spruce including: black spruce, blue spruce, Norway spruce, red spruce, Sitka spruce and white spruce as well as Scot's pine.

Adult beetles emerge in the spring and summer months and will mate soon after emergence. The adult male beetles release an aggregation phremone called fuscumol, which will attract other brown spruce longhorn beetles to their location. After mating, females will select a suitable host tree for egg laying. Eggs may be laid on either standing trees or recently felled timber, with eggs laid on the bark. Larvae hatch out and bore into the phloem of the wood where they will feed until they pupate the next spring and then emerge as adults.

== Pest Status ==
In its European range, brown spruce longhorn beetle infests dead and dying trees, or recently felled timber. This infestation may occasionally lead to the death of diseased or stressed trees that may otherwise have recovered., and it is considered to sometimes be damaging to trees in Europe. In Canada, the pest initially appeared to be more aggressive and able to infest healthy red spruce trees, with larval galleries girdling the stem and killing the tree. Though research showed that infested trees in Canada are of reduced vigour, and that larvae have a very low survival rate on healthy trees.

Brown spruce longhorn may introduce blue stain fungi when it infested trees or logs, which can reduce the value of timber.
