= Asemum australe =

Scientific classification
- Domain: Eukaryota
- Kingdom: Animalia
- Phylum: Arthropoda
- Class: Insecta
- Order: Coleoptera
- Suborder: Polyphaga
- Infraorder: Cucujiformia
- Family: Cerambycidae
- Genus: Asemum
- Species: A. australe

Binomial name
- Asemum australe LeConte, 1850

Species of beetle

Asemum australe is a species of beetle in the family Cerambycidae. It was described by John Lawrence LeConte in 1850. Notably, with a brown body, that is oval-shaped.
