= Tetropium beckeri =

Scientific classification
- Kingdom: Animalia
- Phylum: Arthropoda
- Class: Insecta
- Order: Coleoptera
- Suborder: Polyphaga
- Infraorder: Cucujiformia
- Family: Cerambycidae
- Genus: Tetropium
- Species: T. beckeri

Binomial name
- Tetropium beckeri Franz, 1955

Species of beetle

Tetropium beckeri is a species of beetle in the family Cerambycidae. It was described by Franz in 1955.
