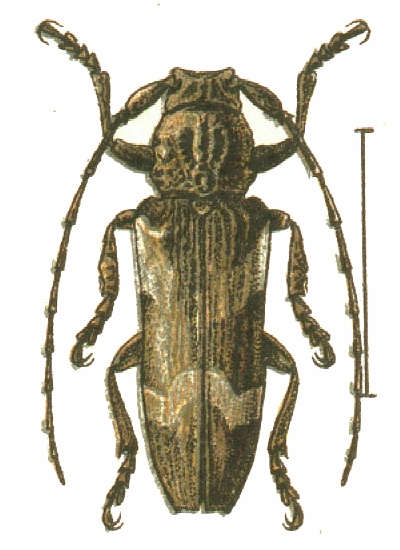

Scientific classification
- Kingdom: Animalia
- Phylum: Arthropoda
- Class: Insecta
- Order: Coleoptera
- Suborder: Polyphaga
- Infraorder: Cucujiformia
- Family: Cerambycidae
- Tribe: Pteropliini
- Genus: Niphona
- Species: N. picticornis

Binomial name
- Niphona picticornis Mulsant, 1839

Synonyms
- Nyphona picticornis (Mulsant, 1839)

= Niphona picticornis =

Species of beetle

Niphona picticornis is a species of beetle in the family Cerambycidae. It was described by Étienne Mulsant in 1839. It has a wide distribution in Europe. It feeds on Euphorbia dendroides, Castanea sativa, Pistacia terebinthus, Pistacia lentiscus, and Phoenix canariensis. It acts as a host for the parasitic wasp Xorides propinquus.
