= Tetropium parvulum =

Scientific classification
- Kingdom: Animalia
- Phylum: Arthropoda
- Class: Insecta
- Order: Coleoptera
- Suborder: Polyphaga
- Infraorder: Cucujiformia
- Family: Cerambycidae
- Genus: Tetropium
- Species: T. parvulum

Binomial name
- Tetropium parvulum Casey, 1891

Synonyms
- Tetropium alaskanum Fall, 1926

Species of beetle

Tetropium parvulum, the northern spruce borer, is a species of long-horned beetle in the family Cerambycidae. It is found in North America.
