= Neospondylis =

Scientific classification
- Domain: Eukaryota
- Kingdom: Animalia
- Phylum: Arthropoda
- Class: Insecta
- Order: Coleoptera
- Suborder: Polyphaga
- Infraorder: Cucujiformia
- Family: Cerambycidae
- Tribe: Spondylidini
- Genus: Neospondylis; Sama, 2005

Genus of beetles

Neospondylis is a genus of long-horned beetles in the family Cerambycidae. There are at least two described species in Neospondylis.

== Species ==
These two species belong to the genus Neospondylis:

- Neospondylis mexicanus (Bates, 1879)
- Neospondylis upiformis (Mannerheim, 1843)
