= Xorides calidus =

Scientific classification
- Kingdom: Animalia
- Phylum: Arthropoda
- Class: Insecta
- Order: Hymenoptera
- Family: Ichneumonidae
- Genus: Xorides
- Species: X. calidus

Binomial name
- Xorides calidus (Provancher, 1886)

Species of wasp

Xorides calidus is a species of ichneumon wasp in the family Ichneumonidae.

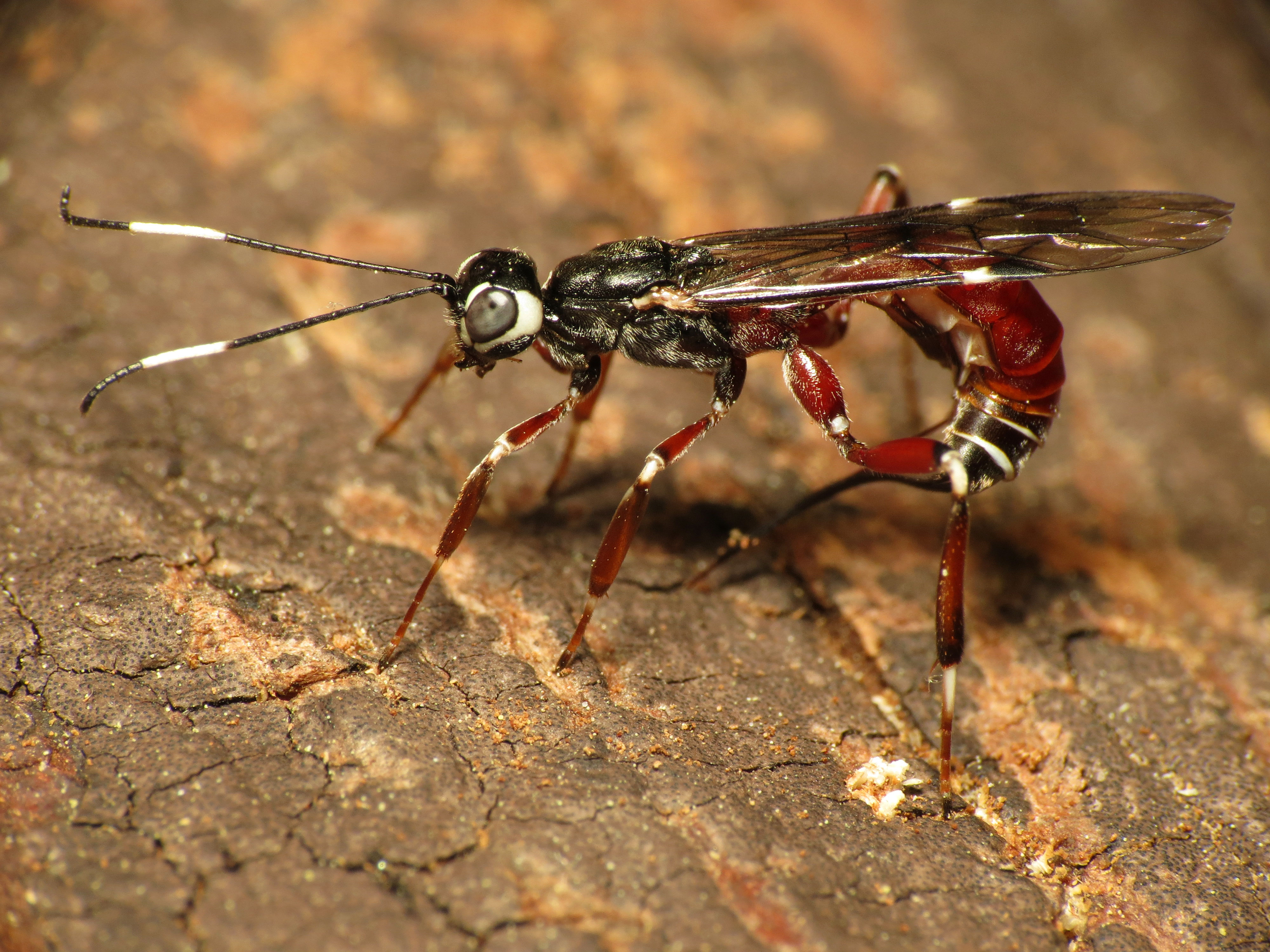
