= Xorides propinquus =

Scientific classification
- Domain: Eukaryota
- Kingdom: Animalia
- Phylum: Arthropoda
- Class: Insecta
- Order: Hymenoptera
- Family: Ichneumonidae
- Genus: Xorides
- Species: X. propinquus

Binomial name
- Xorides propinquus (Tschek, 1868)

Species of wasp

Xorides propinquus is a parasitoid wasp from the family Ichneumonidae that parasitizes longhorn beetles of next species: Trichoferus griseus, Semanotus russicus, Niphona picticornis.
