= Xorides niger =

Scientific classification
- Domain: Eukaryota
- Kingdom: Animalia
- Phylum: Arthropoda
- Class: Insecta
- Order: Hymenoptera
- Family: Ichneumonidae
- Genus: Xorides
- Species: X. niger

Binomial name
- Xorides niger (Pfeffer, 1913)

Species of wasp

Xorides niger is a parasitoid wasp from the family Ichneumonidae family that parasitizes longhorn beetles of next species and subspecies: Tetropium castaneum, Molorchus minor minor.
