= Scaphinus =

Scientific classification
- Kingdom: Animalia
- Phylum: Arthropoda
- Class: Insecta
- Order: Coleoptera
- Suborder: Polyphaga
- Infraorder: Cucujiformia
- Family: Cerambycidae
- Tribe: Spondylidini
- Genus: Scaphinus; LeConte, 1851

Genus of beetles

Scaphinus is a genus of long-horned beetles in the family Cerambycidae. There is one described species in Scaphinus, S. muticus.
