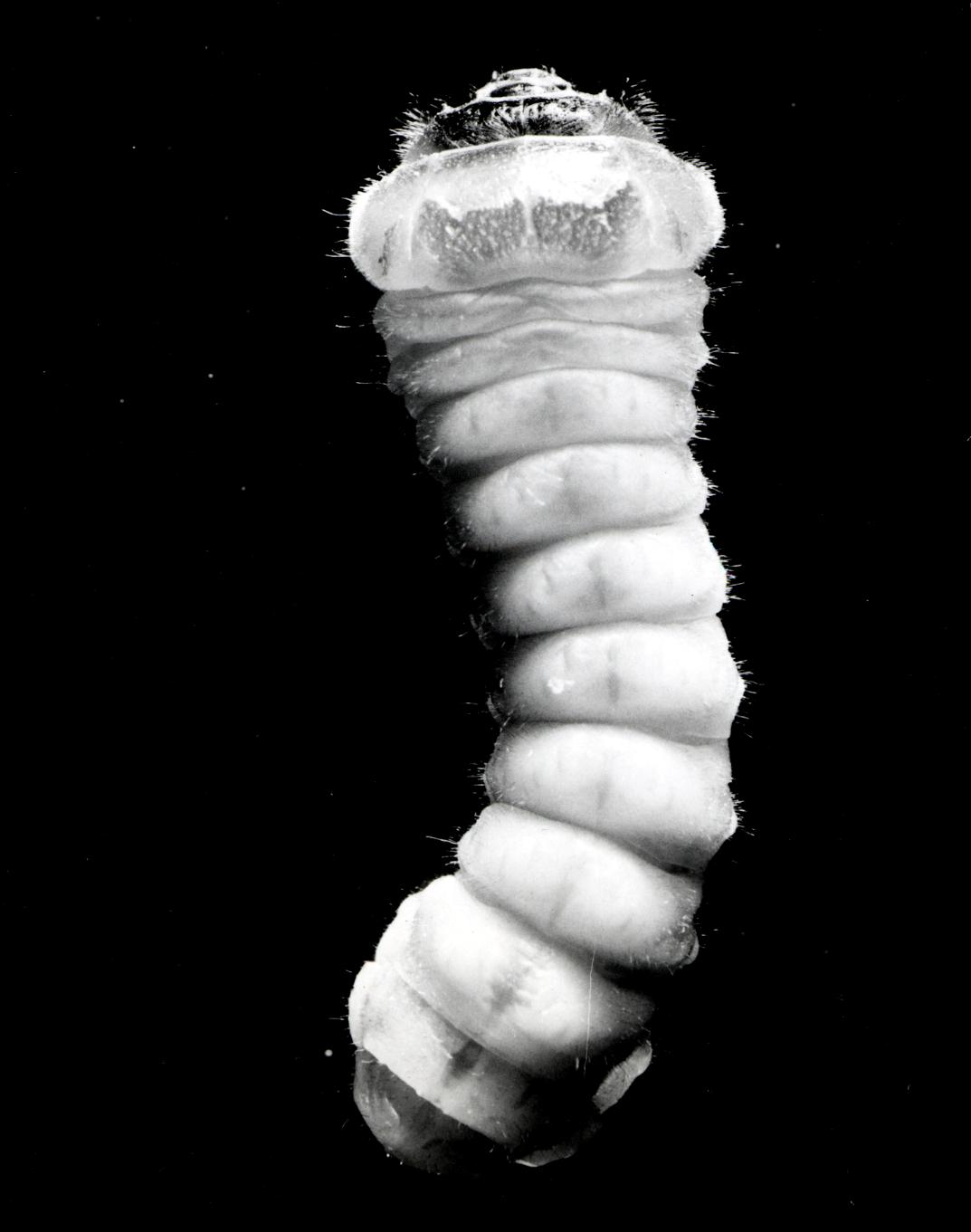
- Arhopalus productus larva, dorsal view (c.1955)

Scientific classification
- Domain: Eukaryota
- Kingdom: Animalia
- Phylum: Arthropoda
- Class: Insecta
- Order: Coleoptera
- Suborder: Polyphaga
- Infraorder: Cucujiformia
- Family: Cerambycidae
- Genus: Arhopalus
- Species: A. productus

Binomial name
- Arhopalus productus (LeConte, 1850)

= Arhopalus productus =

Species of beetle

Arhopalus productus is a species of beetle in the family Cerambycidae. It was described by John Lawrence LeConte in 1850.
