= Tetropium schwarzianum =

Scientific classification
- Kingdom: Animalia
- Phylum: Arthropoda
- Class: Insecta
- Order: Coleoptera
- Suborder: Polyphaga
- Infraorder: Cucujiformia
- Family: Cerambycidae
- Genus: Tetropium
- Species: T. schwarzianum

Binomial name
- Tetropium schwarzianum Casey, 1891

Species of beetle

Tetropium schwarzianum is a species of beetle in the family Cerambycidae. It was described by Casey in 1891.
