= Arhopalus cubensis =

Scientific classification
- Domain: Eukaryota
- Kingdom: Animalia
- Phylum: Arthropoda
- Class: Insecta
- Order: Coleoptera
- Suborder: Polyphaga
- Infraorder: Cucujiformia
- Family: Cerambycidae
- Genus: Arhopalus
- Species: A. cubensis

Binomial name
- Arhopalus cubensis (Mutchler, 1914)

Species of beetle

Arhopalus cubensis is a species of beetle in the family Cerambycidae. It was described by Mutchler in 1914.
