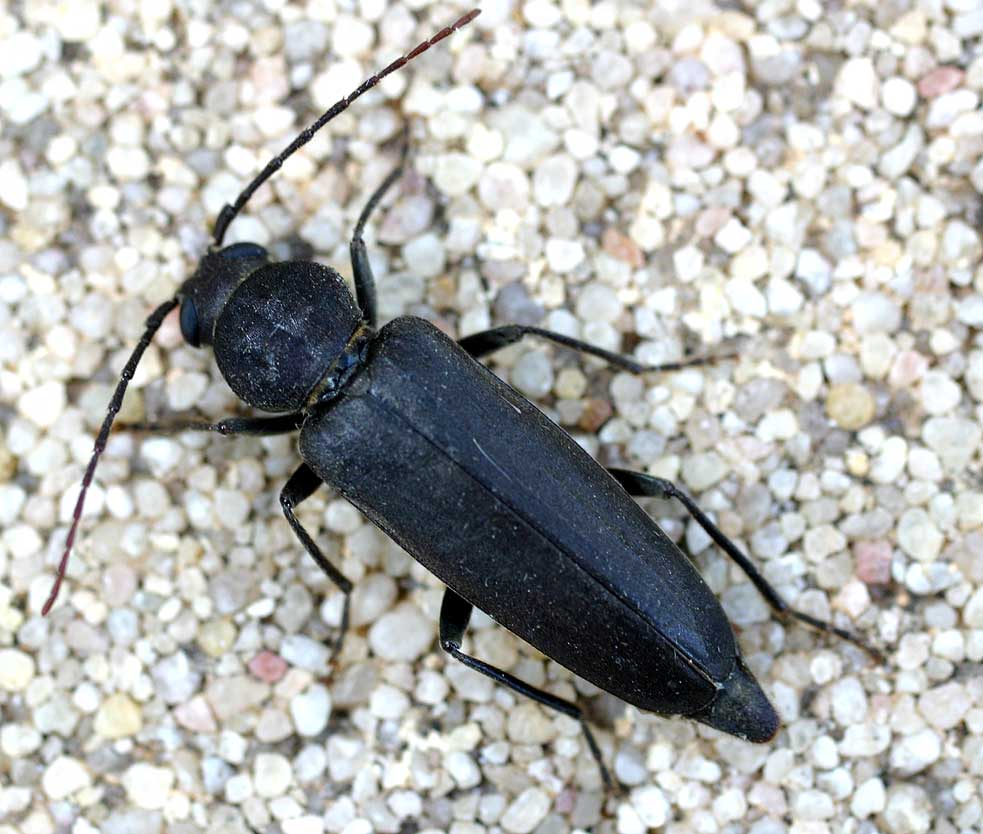
- Arhopalus ferus ♀

Scientific classification
- Domain: Eukaryota
- Kingdom: Animalia
- Phylum: Arthropoda
- Class: Insecta
- Order: Coleoptera
- Suborder: Polyphaga
- Infraorder: Cucujiformia
- Family: Cerambycidae
- Subfamily: Spondylidinae
- Tribe: Asemini
- Genus: Arhopalus; Serville, 1834

Synonyms
- Arhopalus Audinet-Serville, 1834; Cephalocrius Sharp, 1905; Criocephalum Schiödte, 1864; Criocephalus Mulsant, 1839; Criocephalum Dejean, 1835

= Arhopalus =

Genus of beetles

Arhopalus is a genus of beetles in the family Cerambycidae, the longhorn beetles, in the tribe Asemini.

== Species ==
BioLib lists:

1. Arhopalus asperatus (LeConte, 1859)
2. Arhopalus biarcuatus Pu, 1981
3. Arhopalus brunneus (Gardner, 1942)
4. Arhopalus cavatus Pu, 1981
5. Arhopalus coreanus (Sharp, 1905)
6. Arhopalus cubensis (Mutchler, 1914)
7. Arhopalus deceptor (Sharp, 1905)
8. Arhopalus exoticus (Sharp, 1905)
9. Arhopalus ferus (Mulsant, 1839)
10. Arhopalus foveatus Chiang, 1963
11. Arhopalus foveicollis (Haldeman, 1847)
12. Arhopalus hispaniolae (Fisher, 1942)
13. †Arhopalus pavitus (Cockerell, 1927)
14. Arhopalus pinetorum (Wollaston, 1863)
15. Arhopalus productus (LeConte, 1850)
16. Arhopalus rusticus (Linnaeus, 1758)
17. Arhopalus syriacus (Reitter, 1895)
18. Arhopalus tibetanus (Sharp, 1905)
19. Arhopalus tobirensis Hayashi, 1968
