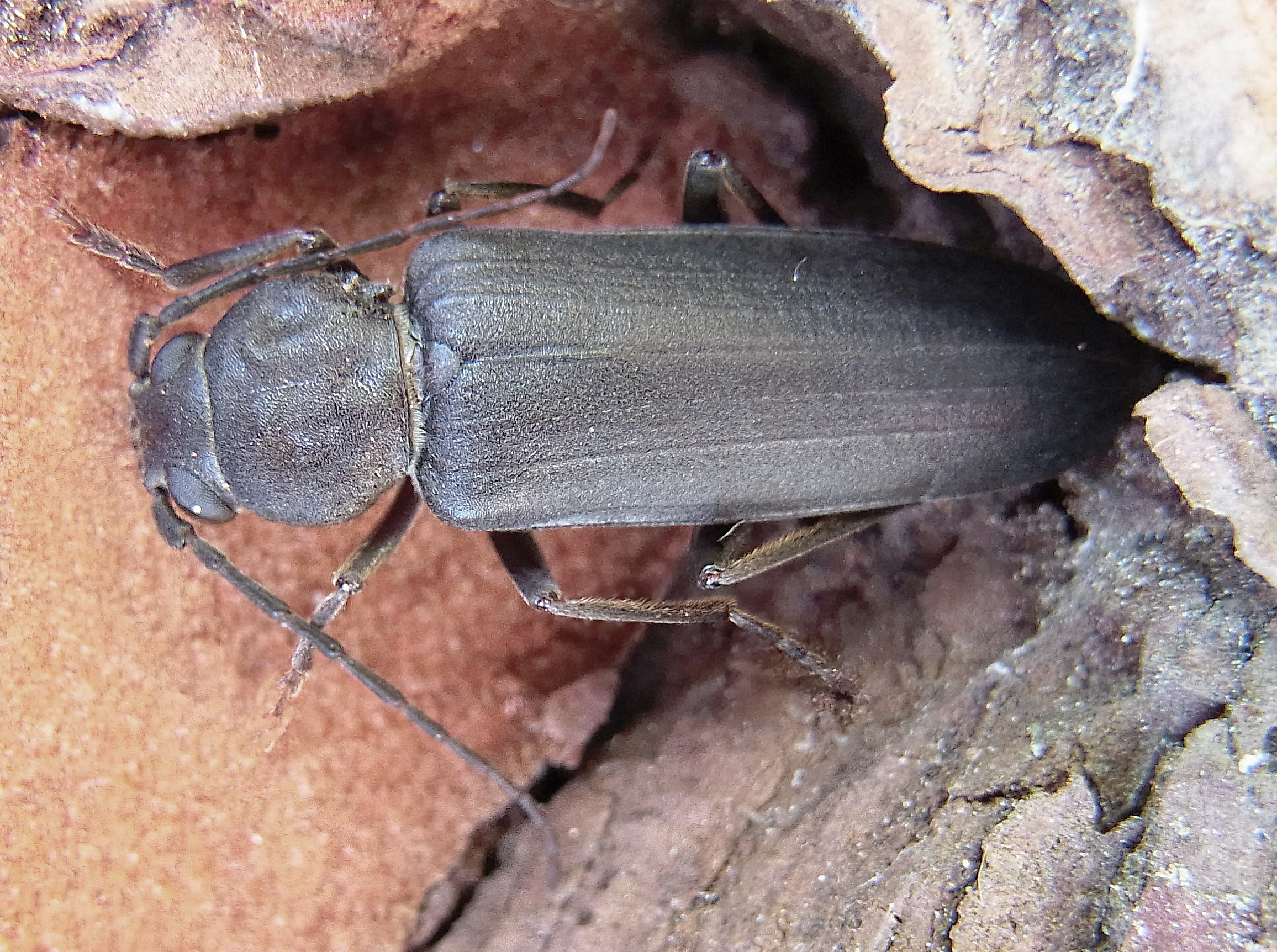

Scientific classification
- Kingdom: Animalia
- Phylum: Arthropoda
- Class: Insecta
- Order: Coleoptera
- Suborder: Polyphaga
- Infraorder: Cucujiformia
- Family: Cerambycidae
- Genus: Arhopalus
- Species: A. ferus

Binomial name
- Arhopalus ferus (Mulsant, 1839)

Synonyms
- Callidium tristis Fabricius, 1787; Criocephalus ferus Mulsant, 1839; Criocephalum polonicum Motschulsky, 1845

= Arhopalus ferus =

Species of beetle

Arhopalus ferus, commonly known as the burnt pine longhorn beetle, is a species of long horn beetle, of the order Coleoptera. It was first described by French entomologist Étienne Mulsant in 1839.

== Description ==
Adult beetles are 8–30 mm long reddish-brown to black, while males are generally smaller and lighter in colour.

The body is elongated and oval, typical for longhorn beetles. The head angles forward, showing most of the mouth parts. The thread-like antennae are half to three-quarters of the body length, longer in males. The prothorax is smoothly curved with no spines, narrower than the elytra. The elytra have four ridges and slightly tapering sides.

Eggs are white, opaque, and cigar-shaped, measuring about 0.5 by 1.8 mm. Creamy white larvae are cylindrical, with noticeable legs and pointed jaws. Larvae are active when removed from their tunnels.

== Behaviour ==
=== Diet ===
Arhopalus ferus prefers dead or dying Pinus and Picea injured by fire or other damage but rarely it will develop in healthy trees. Females are attracted to volatiles from burnt trees or sawmills.

=== Life cycle ===
Adults, live for several weeks, and emerge in spring to autumn. Females can lay up to about 1000 eggs and they prefer to lay the eggs in fire-scorched host material. Eggs are laid in groups of 5 to 50 in the bark cracks as early as 24 hours after a fire. If host material is not burned it can still support a lighter population.

Larvae hatch in about 10 days and bore towards the inner layers with preference for phloem and cambium but sometimes eat sapwood. The larval tunnels are oval in cross section and up to 12 mm wide.

It native ranges the beetle needs 3 to 4 years to complete its life cycle but in New Zealand the beetle typically completes its life cycle in 1 to 2 years.

== Distribution ==
Arhopalus ferus naturally occurs across Europe, northern Asia (except Japan), and North Africa. It is an introduced species in New Zealand probably since the 1950s but first reported from Australasia in 1970.
