= Atimia huachucae =

Scientific classification
- Domain: Eukaryota
- Kingdom: Animalia
- Phylum: Arthropoda
- Class: Insecta
- Order: Coleoptera
- Suborder: Polyphaga
- Infraorder: Cucujiformia
- Family: Cerambycidae
- Genus: Atimia
- Species: A. huachucae

Binomial name
- Atimia huachucae Champlain & Knull, 1922

Species of beetle

Atimia huachucae is a species of long-horned beetle in the family Cerambycidae. It is found in North America.
