= Neospondylis upiformis =

Scientific classification
- Domain: Eukaryota
- Kingdom: Animalia
- Phylum: Arthropoda
- Class: Insecta
- Order: Coleoptera
- Suborder: Polyphaga
- Infraorder: Cucujiformia
- Family: Cerambycidae
- Genus: Neospondylis
- Species: N. upiformis

Binomial name
- Neospondylis upiformis (Mannerheim, 1843)

Synonyms
- Spondylis basalis Casey, 1912; Spondylis collaris Casey, 1912; Spondylis laticeps LeConte, 1850; Spondylis parva Casey, 1924; Spondylis robustula Casey, 1912; Spondylis subpubescens Casey, 1912; Spondylis upiformis Mannerheim, 1843

Species of beetle

Neospondylis upiformis is a species of long-horned beetle in the family Cerambycidae. It is found in Central America and North America.
