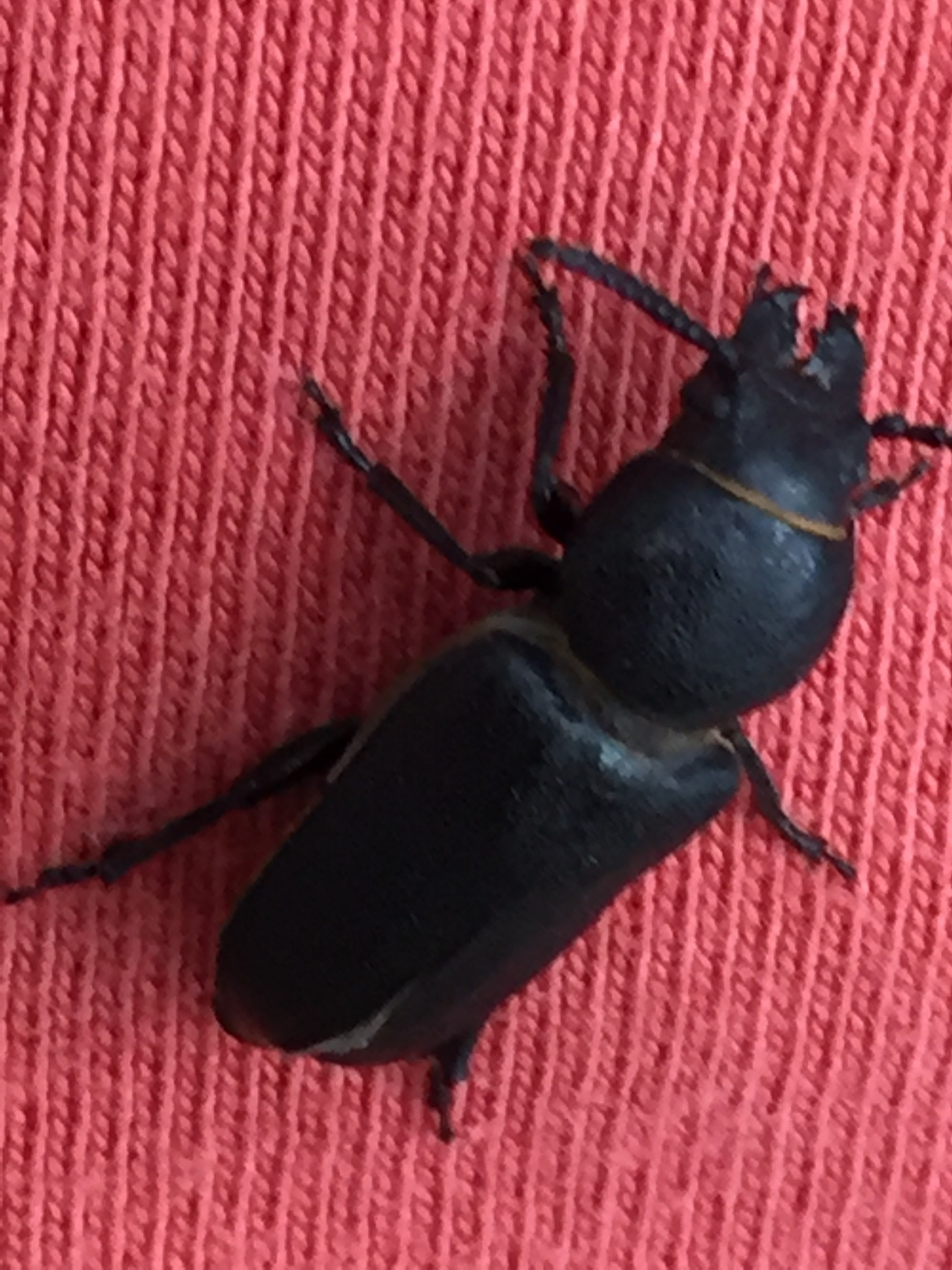

Scientific classification
- Kingdom: Animalia
- Phylum: Arthropoda
- Class: Insecta
- Order: Coleoptera
- Suborder: Polyphaga
- Infraorder: Cucujiformia
- Family: Cerambycidae
- Genus: Spondylis
- Species: S. buprestoides

Binomial name
- Spondylis buprestoides (Linnaeus, 1758)

= Spondylis buprestoides =

Species of beetle

Spondylis buprestoides is bark and wood-boring beetle from the genus Spondylis. These beetles are shiny black and have a cylindrical shape and have large mandibles.

== Range ==
According to observations of the species aggregated on GBIF, this beetle can be found in almost all of Europe. They have also been observed in South Korea and Japan.
