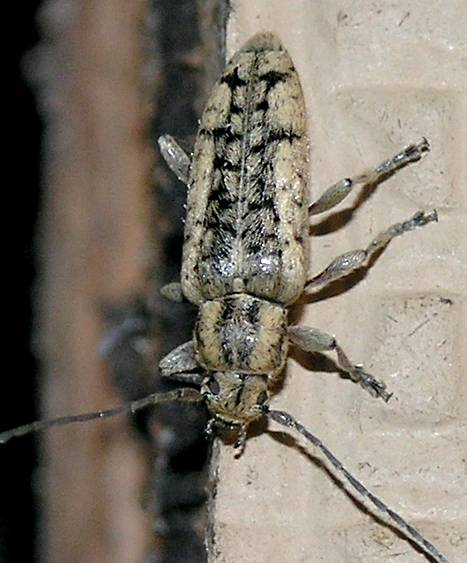

Scientific classification
- Domain: Eukaryota
- Kingdom: Animalia
- Phylum: Arthropoda
- Class: Insecta
- Order: Coleoptera
- Suborder: Polyphaga
- Infraorder: Cucujiformia
- Family: Cerambycidae
- Genus: Atimia
- Species: A. confusa

Binomial name
- Atimia confusa (Say, 1826)

= Atimia confusa =

Species of beetle

Atimia confusa, known generally as the small cedar borer or small cedar-bark borer, is a species of long-horned beetle in the family Cerambycidae. It is found in North America.

== Subspecies ==
These three subspecies belong to the species Atimia confusa:

- Atimia confusa confusa (Say, 1826)
- Atimia confusa dorsalis LeConte, 1869
- Atimia confusa maritima Linsley, 1939
