= Heinrich Gravenhorst =

German beekeeper (1823–1898)

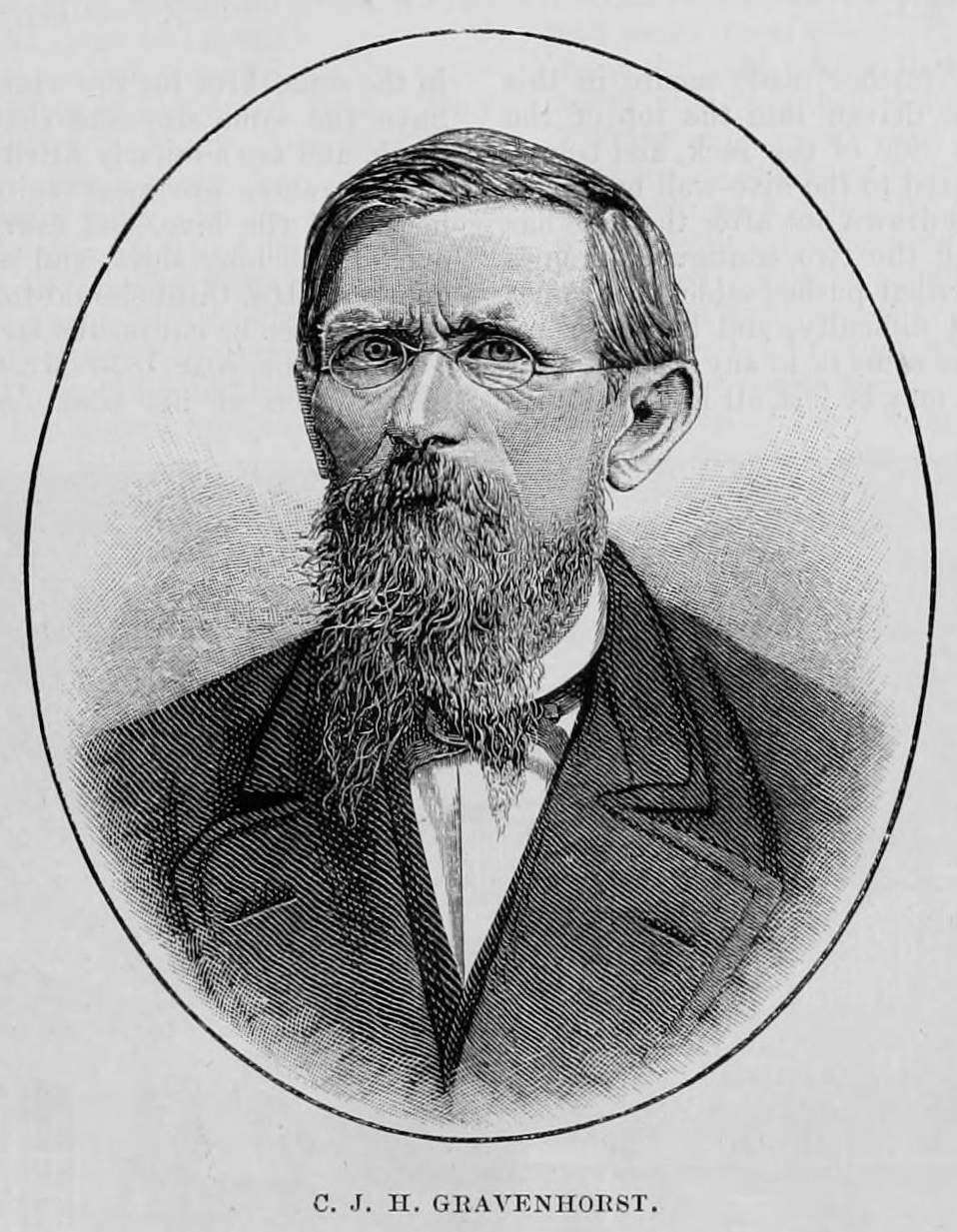

Christoph Johann Heinrich Gravenhorst (26 September 1823 – 21 August 1898) was a German schoolteacher and beekeeper who wrote an influential textbook on apiculture called the Der Praktische Imker (1873) which went into several editions. He also founded a beekeeper's periodical called Illustrierte Bienenzeitung in October 1883. He invented a straw beehive with movable frames which is called Gravenhorst's Bogenstülper.

== Life and work ==
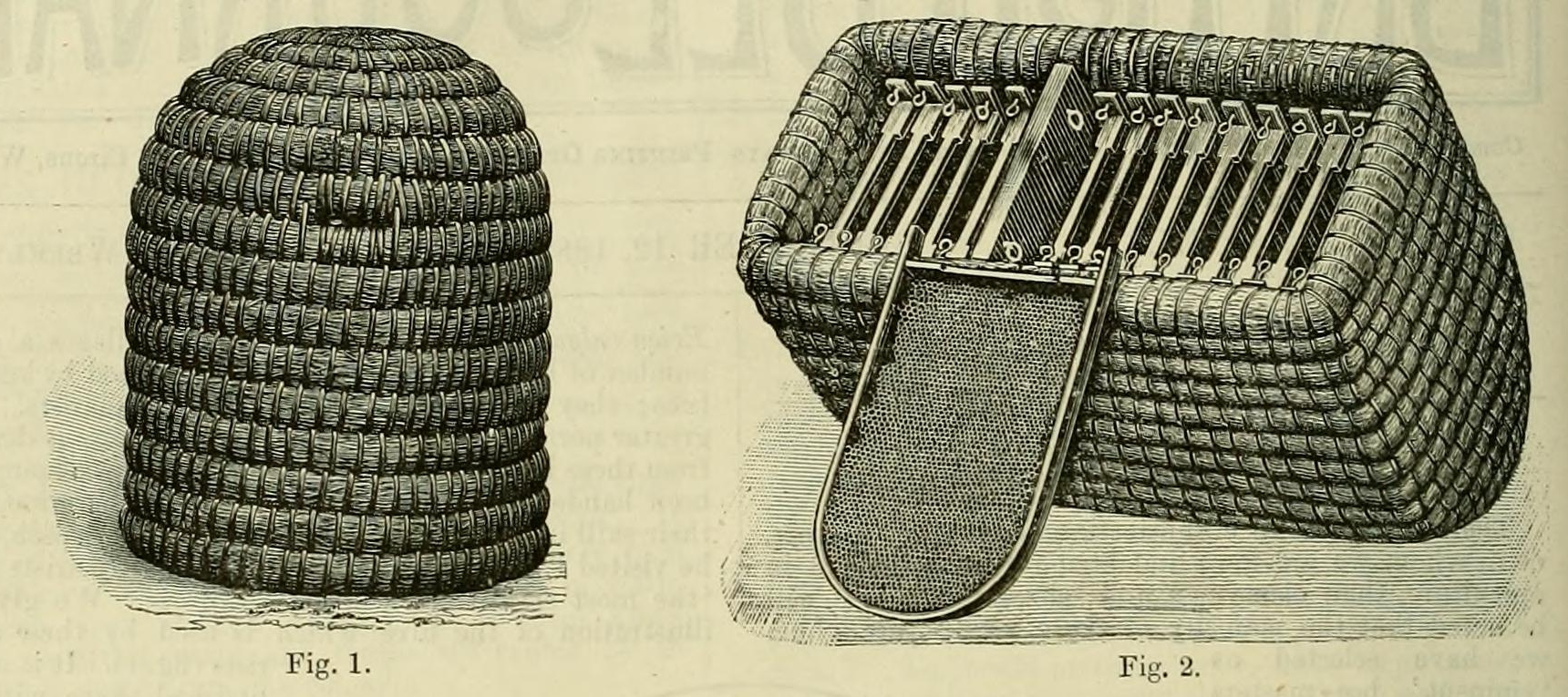
The Bogenstülper

Gravenhorst was born in Watzum in the Duchy of Braunschweig in the Wolfenbüttel district. His father Johann Heinrich Jürgen Gravenhorst worked as a gardener in the Schliestedt manor and later in Hedwigsburg Castle near Pillowbrück where the young Gravenhorst grew up close to nature. His mother was Anna Marie Dorothee née Gödecke. From his parents who kept a farm with an apiary, he learned traditional beekeeping methods at a very early age.

Gravenhorst trained at Wolfenbüttel in 1844 as a school teacher and in 1849 he became a private tutor in Wispenstein and later a teacher at Völkenrode. He married Franziska Bertha Christiana, daughter of deceased surgeon G.J.L. Bielitz, in 1855. He began to lose his hearing from 1857 and was forced to retire in 1860. He then move to Braunschweig to start beekeeping for his livelihood. He studied the works of pastor Dzierzon and August von Berlepsch but also began to examine traditional bee-keeping in the old Lüneburg region. He made us of straw hives that he adapted with Dzierzon frames and called his hive as the Bogenstülper (or tiltable dome). He described this in detail in his 1873 book, Der Praktische Imker, a book which grew in size with each edition. It also began to include biographies of famous beekeepers. In 1874 he visited England and attended the Kilburn Show. He also began a beekeeping periodical called the Illustrierte Bienenzeitung in 1883. In the same year a neighbour sued him for nuisance caused by his bees. He lost the case despite being supported by German beekeepers and was forced to sell off his home and leave Braunschweig in 1887 to settle in Wilsnack. Here he again established apiaries with assistance from his wife and son Hugo. He died in 1898, leaving Hugo to manage the periodical which continued until 1936.
