= Tetropium cinnamopterum =

Scientific classification
- Kingdom: Animalia
- Phylum: Arthropoda
- Class: Insecta
- Order: Coleoptera
- Suborder: Polyphaga
- Infraorder: Cucujiformia
- Family: Cerambycidae
- Genus: Tetropium
- Species: T. cinnamopterum

Binomial name
- Tetropium cinnamopterum Kirby, 1837

Species of beetle

Tetropium cinnamopterum is a species of beetle in the family Cerambycidae. It was described by William Kirby in 1837.
