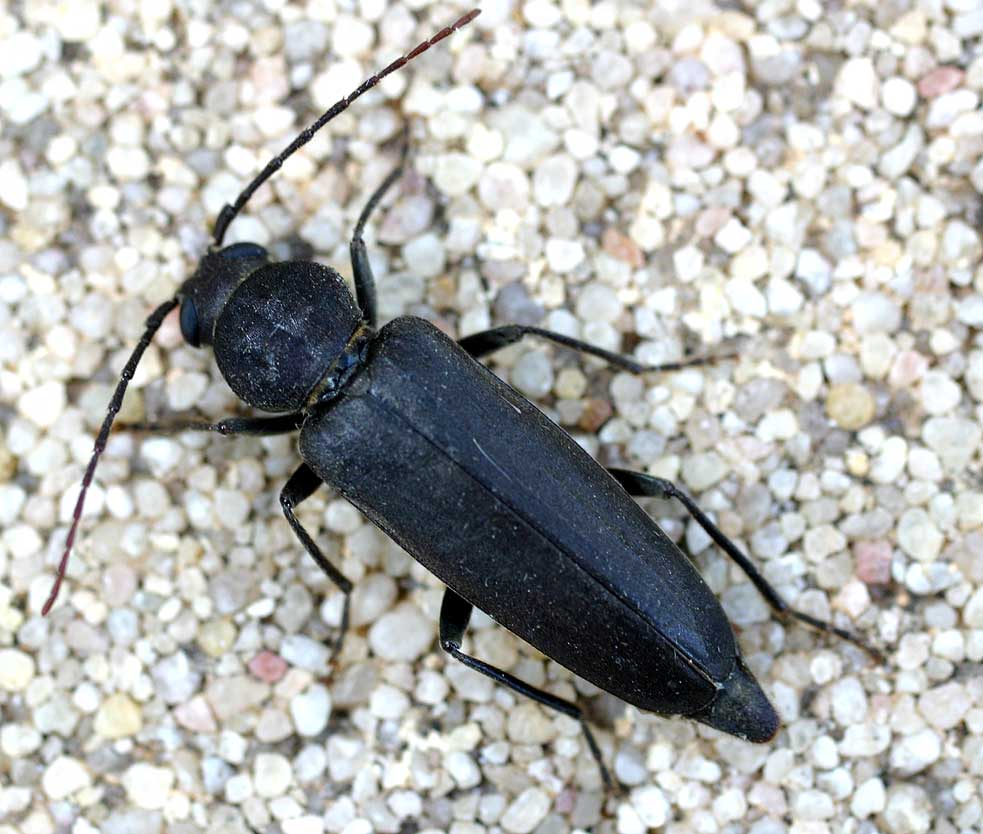
- Arhopalus ferus (Mulsant, 1839) ♀

Scientific classification
- Kingdom: Animalia
- Phylum: Arthropoda
- Clade: Pancrustacea
- Class: Insecta
- Order: Coleoptera
- Suborder: Polyphaga
- Infraorder: Cucujiformia
- Family: Cerambycidae
- Subfamily: Spondylidinae; Audinet-Serville, 1832

= Spondylidinae =

Subfamily of beetles

Spondylidinae (often misspelled "Spondylinae") are a small subfamily of Cerambycidae including slightly over 100 species, primarily in the coniferous forests of the Boreal hemisphere. A few species occur in coniferous forests in tropical and subtropical areas (Mexico, Cuba), while very few genera (e.g., Zamium) are present in Austral Africa and Madagascar (e.g., Masatopus).

== Description ==
Spondylidinae are insects characterised by cerambycine aspect, generally with a more or less flattened, dark body, oblique head and scarcely elongated antennae. Their sexual dimorphism is scarcely evident; males and females are extremely similar. Unlike Cerambycinae, their stridulitrum is divided.

The larvae are completely different from those of Cerambycinae and similar to those of Lepturinae in several respects, being characterised by a rounded head and large labrum. They also typically possess two closely spaced small spines on the last abdominal segment.

== Adult ==
Spondylidinae are nearly all nocturnal or crepuscular. Only the genus Tetropium, characterised by finely faceted eyes, has diurnal activity. The adults live on the host plants, taking refuge under barks or trunks during inactive periods.

== Larva ==
Except for some Saphanini (Saphanus, Drymochares) and Anisarthrini, the larvae of most of species attack conifers.

== History ==
Spondylidinae have a complicated systematic history, and details of the relationships are still uncertain. In 1897 Xambeu united the genera Spondylis, Asemum, Chriocephalus (now Arhopalus) and Tetropium in Spondyliens, on the basis of the larval morphology. Nevertheless, this classification was rejected by contemporaneous authors since Spondylis was believed to be related to Prioninae and Parandra. At that time most spondylidine genera were placed within the subfamily Aseminae. A later study of the wing morphology confirmed Xambeu's grouping, but by the end of the 20th Century (and in some contemporaneous faunas) Spondylidini were treated as a separate subfamily. Only after 1987, after further studies on the larval morphology, was it recognized that spondylidines and asemines were indeed part of the same group, rather than separate lineages. Spondylidini - whose larvae are indistinguishable from that of all other traditional Aseminae - appear to be simply highly derived Asemini, with adult morphology convergent with lucaniform Prioninae and the Vesperidae of the Amazon rainforest genus Migdolus. It has further complicated matters that various authors have misspelled the name of the group as "Spondylini" or "Spondylinae", but these are junior homonyms of Spondylidae Gray, 1826, a mollusc name.

== Current systematics ==
Spondylidinae (this name has priority over Aseminae) includes seven tribes. The number of species below is approximate and changes over time.

- Anisarthrini Mamaev & Danilevsky, 1973 - (Africa, Europe, Asia), 9 species
- Asemini Thomson, 1860 - (Palearctic, North, Central, and South America, New Zealand, Australia), 43 species
- Atimiini LeConte, 1873 - (North America, Asia), 18 species
- Nothorhinini Zagajkevich, 1991 - (Europe, Asia, North America), 2 species in one genus (often placed within Asemini)
- Saphanini Gistel, 1856 - (Europe, western Asia, Africa, Madagascar, eastern U.S.), 45 species
- Spondylidini Audinet-Serville, 1832 - (Europe, Asia, North America, Mexico), 4 species
- Tetropiini Seidlitz, 1891 - (Europe, Asia, North America, Central America), 146 species in one genus (often placed within Asemini)
