= Saphanus =

Scientific classification
- Kingdom: Animalia
- Phylum: Arthropoda
- Class: Insecta
- Order: Coleoptera
- Suborder: Polyphaga
- Infraorder: Cucujiformia
- Family: Cerambycidae
- Genus: Saphanus; Audinet-Serville, 1834

Genus of beetles

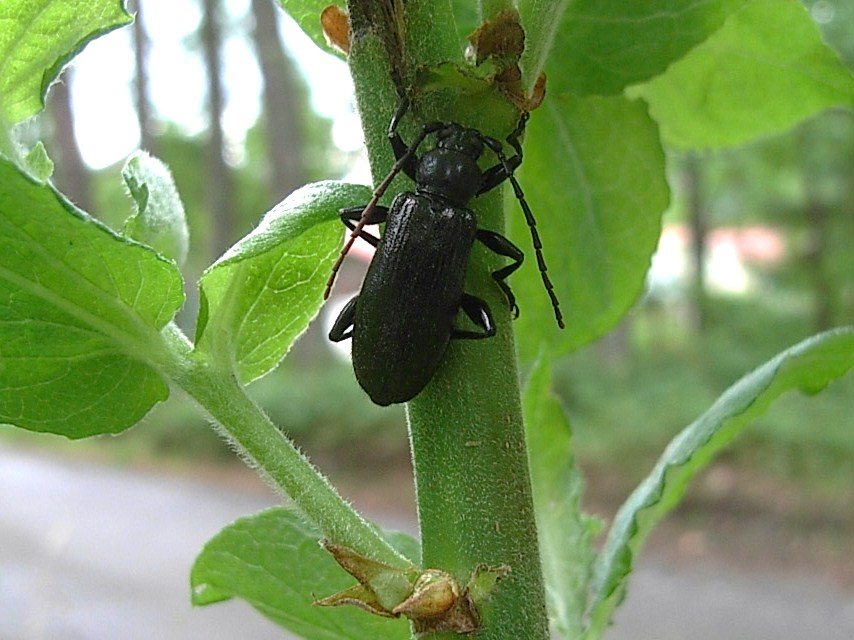
Female of species Saphanus piceus bartolonii

Saphanus is a genus of beetles belonging to the family Cerambycidae.

The species of this genus are found in Central Europe.

Species:

- Saphanus kadleci Rapuzzi & Sama, 2014
- Saphanus piceus (Laicharting, 1784)
