= Gravenhorst =

Gravenhorst is a German surname. Notable persons with the surname include:

- Christoph Johann Heinrich Gravenhorst (1823–1898), German apiarist
- Johann Ludwig Christian Gravenhorst (1777–1857), German zoologist
