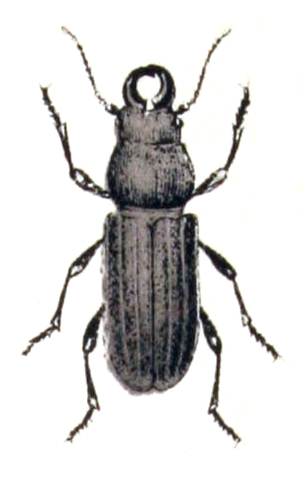
- Spondylis buprestoides

Scientific classification
- Domain: Eukaryota
- Kingdom: Animalia
- Phylum: Arthropoda
- Class: Insecta
- Order: Coleoptera
- Suborder: Polyphaga
- Infraorder: Cucujiformia
- Family: Cerambycidae
- Genus: Spondylis; Fabricius, 1775

= Spondylis =

Genus of beetles

Spondylis is a genus of beetles belonging to the family Cerambycidae.

The species of this genus are found in Europe and Japan.

Species:

- Spondylis buprestoides (Linnaeus, 1758)
- Spondylis tertiarius Germar, 1849
