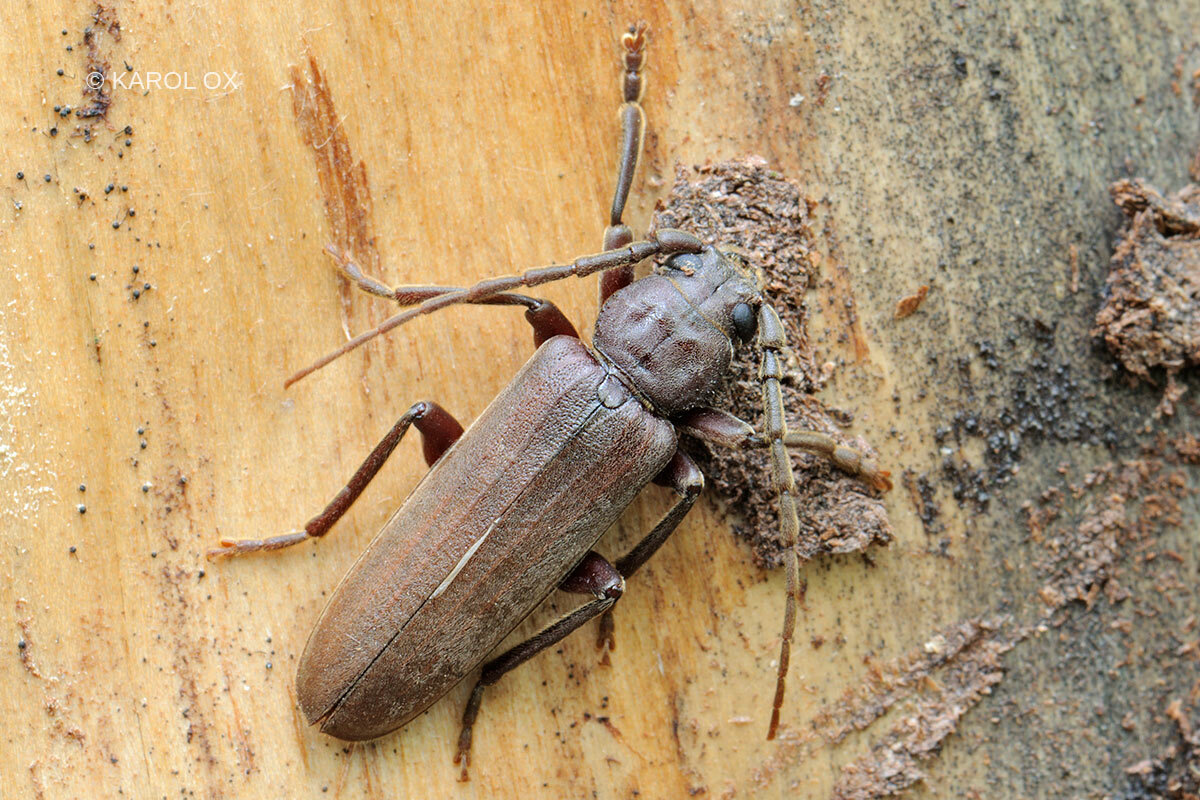

Scientific classification
- Kingdom: Animalia
- Phylum: Arthropoda
- Class: Insecta
- Order: Coleoptera
- Suborder: Polyphaga
- Infraorder: Cucujiformia
- Family: Cerambycidae
- Genus: Arhopalus
- Species: A. rusticus

Binomial name
- Arhopalus rusticus (Linnaeus, 1758)

= Arhopalus rusticus =

Rust Pine Borer

Species of beetle

Arhopalus rusticus, the rust pine borer, is a species of beetle in the family Cerambycidae. It was described by Carl Linnaeus in his 1758 10th edition of Systema Naturae.

== Distribution and habitat ==
It is a common species in the northern and central Europe, Siberia, Korea, Mongolia, northern Pakistan, Japan and northern China. It is also found across the US and has been introduced to Australia. It tends to nest in conifers, such as the Scots pine and the Norway spruce. It tends to infest the basal part of trees up to 1.5 m in height. It is nocturnal and tends to hide under bark during the day, but is attracted to light after night.

== Description ==
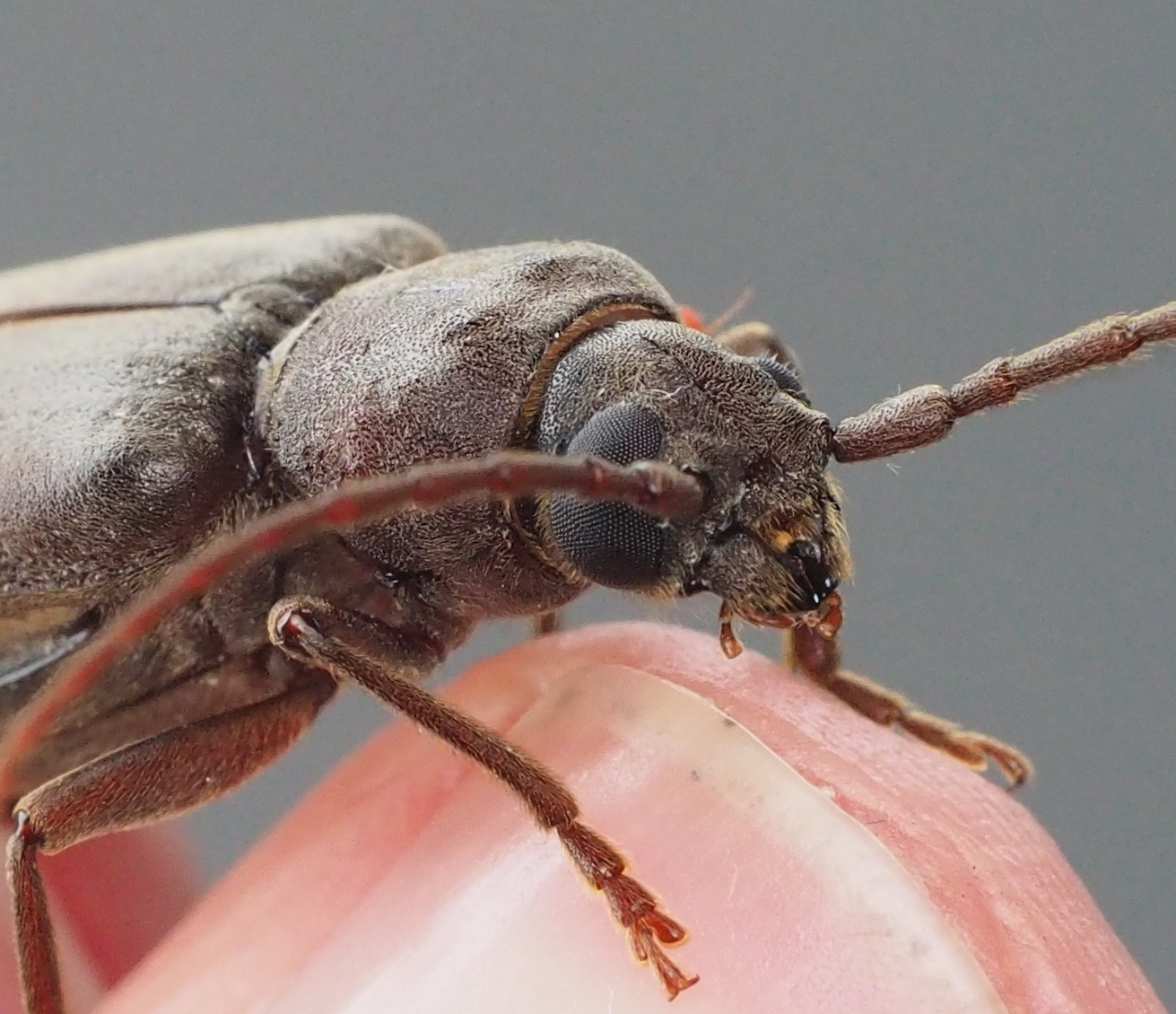
Head, with human finger to scale

Adults are usually 10–30 mm long. Adults are dark brown or brownish red and dull. The body is elongated and flattened and slightly haired. Elytrae have 2 or 3 parallel ridges. The antennae of females are not longer than half of the body and those of males are about two-thirds of the body length. The egg is white and elongated, and is around 0.5 mm × 1.9 mm in size. The larva is white, flattened and up to 28–39 mm long. The pupa has a length of up to 25 mm.

== Biology ==
The species are adults from mid-June through late-August. Mating occurs at sunset. Females oviposit eggs in clusters into crevices in the thick bark. One female can lay up to 800 eggs. Larvae hatch 2–3 weeks after oviposition and feed under the bark. After 4–6 weeks larvae enter the wood through oval holes and dig tunnels of 6–7 mm in width. Galleries are very similar to those of A. striatum. Larvae overwinter once or twice under the bark or in the wood. In spring or summer of the third year after mating, the larvae construct pupal chambers and chew exit holes. The pupal stage lasts 14–21 days. Adults emerge through exit holes. The species has one generation every two years.
