= Xorides =

- Xorides calidus

Scientific classification
- Kingdom: Animalia
- Phylum: Arthropoda
- Class: Insecta
- Order: Hymenoptera
- Family: Ichneumonidae
- Subfamily: Xoridinae
- Genus: Xorides; Latreille, 1809

Genus of wasps

Xorides is a genus of ichneumon wasps in the family Ichneumonidae. There are at least 150 described species in Xorides.

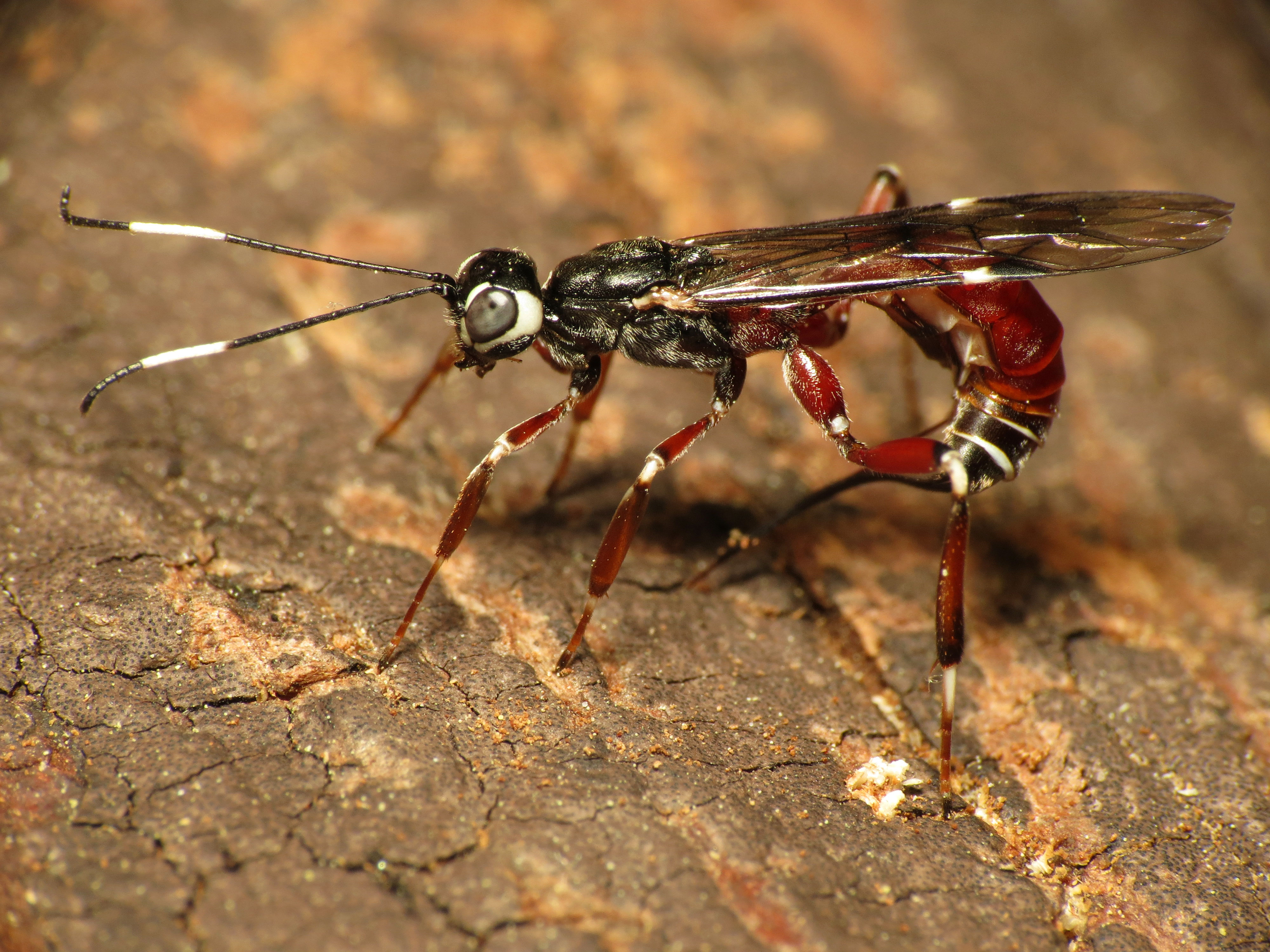
Xorides calidus

== See also ==
- List of Xorides species
