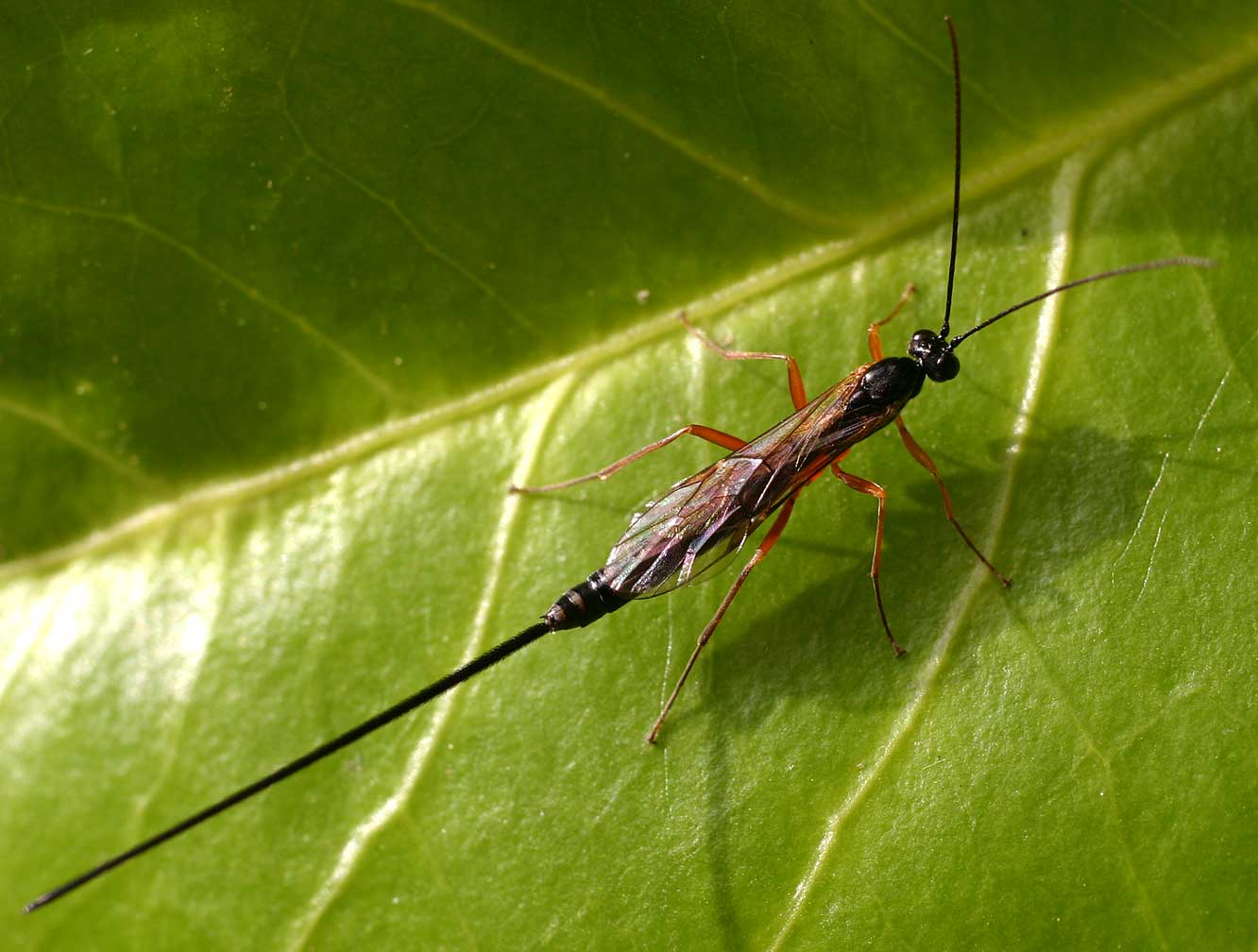
- Unidentified Lissonota species from entomart.be

Scientific classification
- Kingdom: Animalia
- Phylum: Arthropoda
- Class: Insecta
- Order: Hymenoptera
- Family: Ichneumonidae
- Subfamily: Banchinae

Tribes
- Atrophini; Banchini; Glyptini

= Banchinae =

Subfamily of wasps

Banchinae is a subfamily of ichneumonid parasitoid wasps containing about 1,500 species; the genera Glypta and Lissonota are very large. The three tribes (Banchini, Glyptini and Atrophini) are all distributed worldwide.

In older treatments, the Lycorininae, Neorhacodinae and Stilbopinae are often included in the Banchinae; newer works usually consider them separate subfamilies.

All banchines are koinobiont endoparasites of Lepidoptera. The Glyptini parasitise Tortricoidea. Atrophini parasitise a wider range of small moths. Species of Lissonota have long ovipositors able to reach deep wood-boring Lepidoptera such as Cossidae. Banchinae and Campopleginae are the only subfamilies of Ichneumonidae known to have polydnaviruses.

Most Banchinae have a stalked diamond-shaped areolet. A lobe of the propodeum projects over the middle coxae. The propodeum has few ridges (carinae), and the face is described as goat-like.

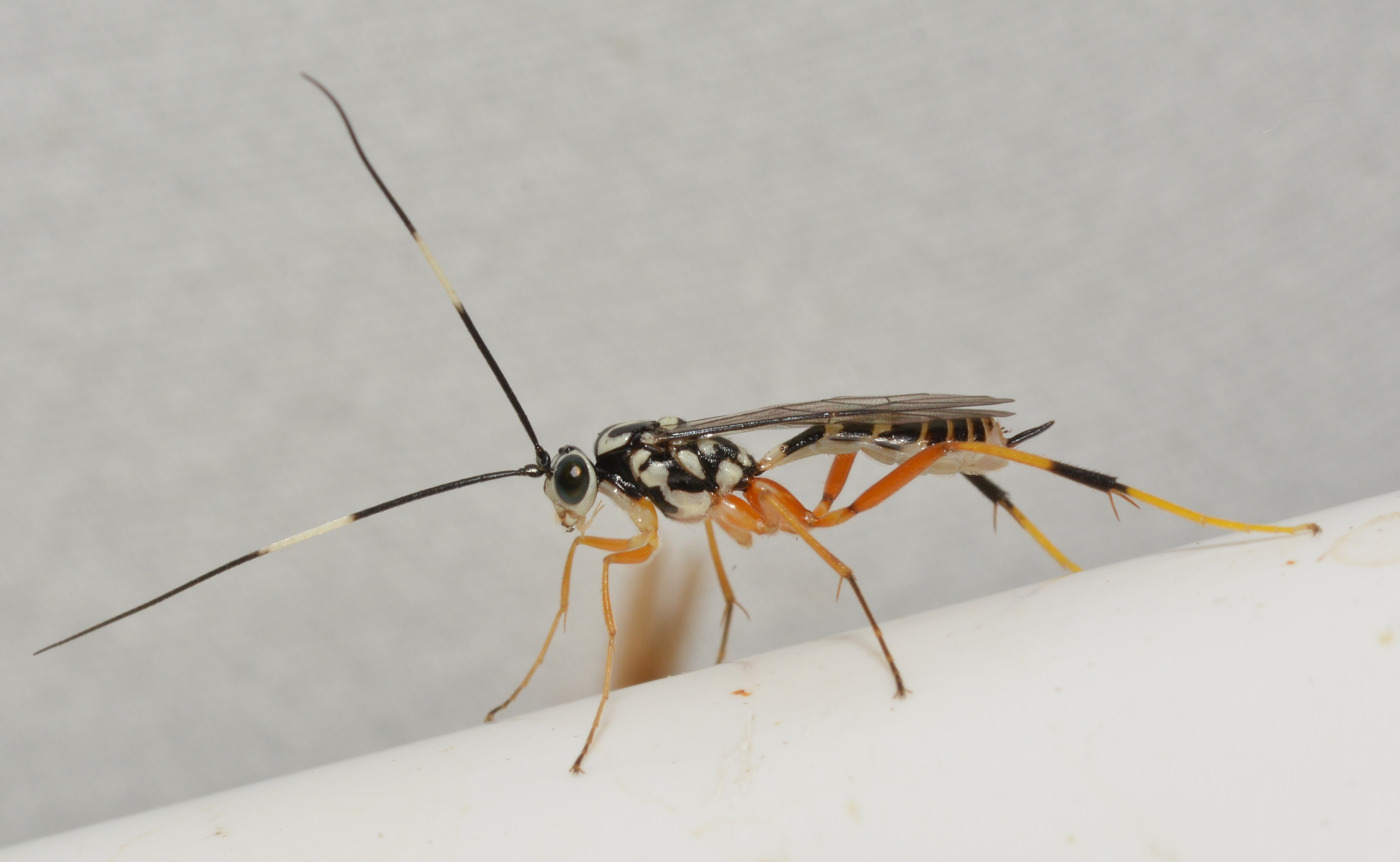
Atrophini: Diradops bethunei

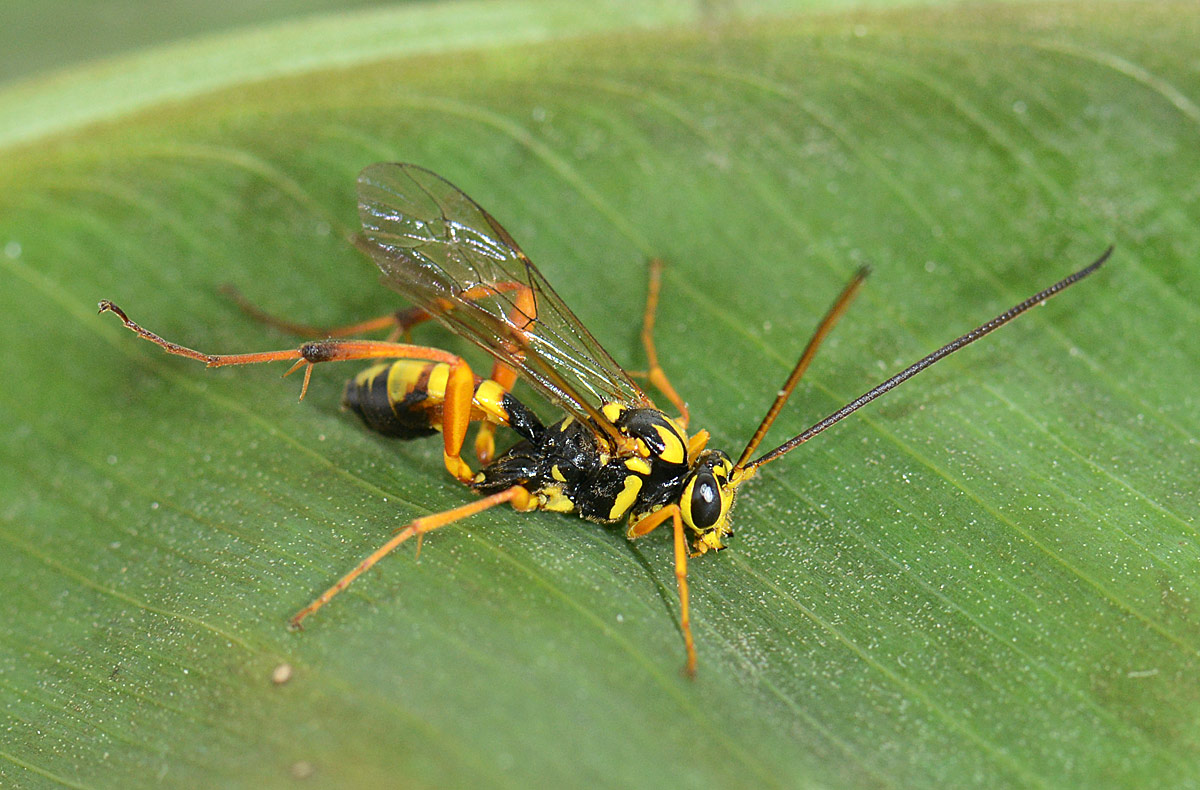
Banchini: Banchus volutatorius

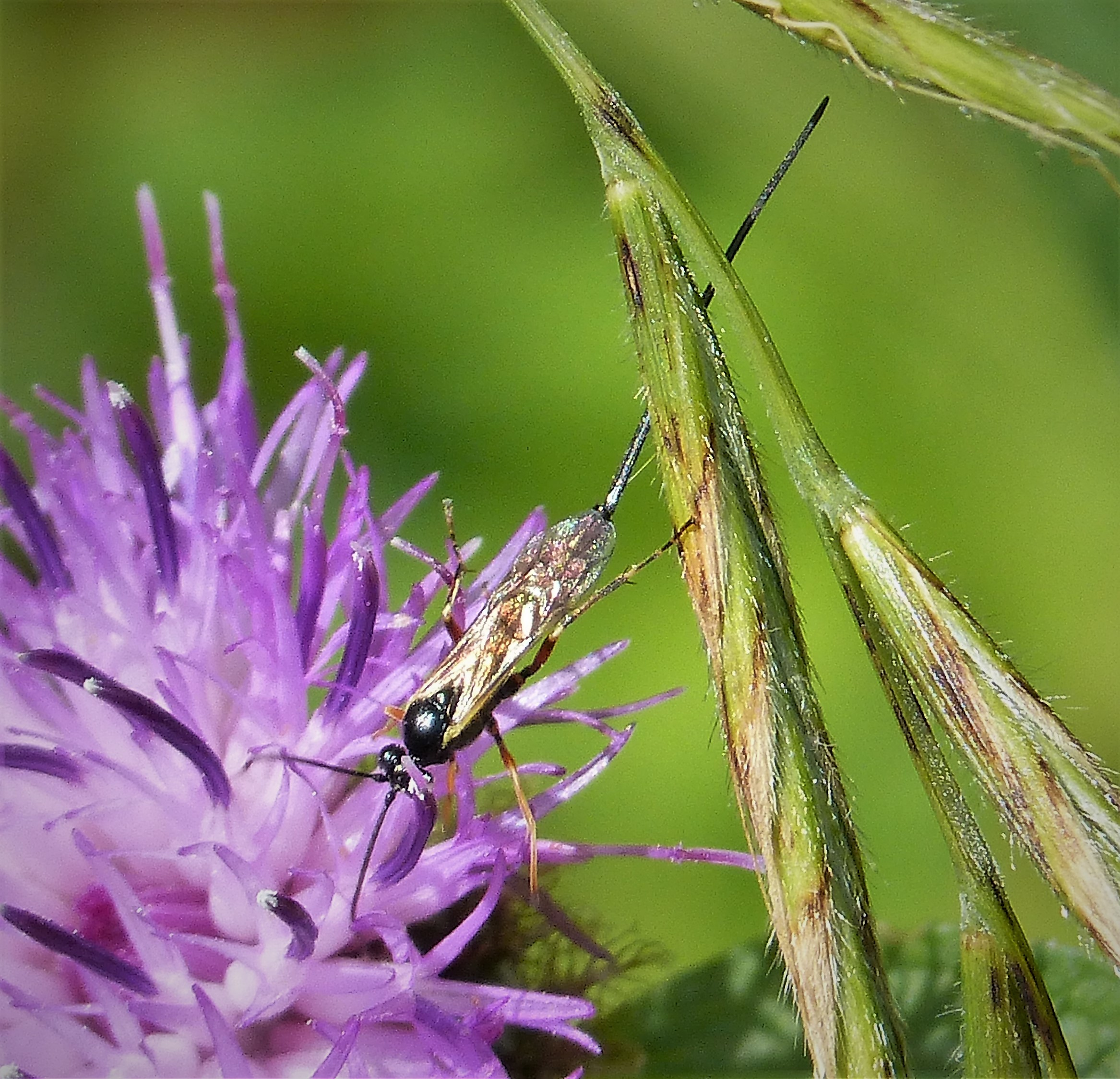
Glyptini: Glypta sp.

== Genera ==
These 42 genera belong to the subfamily Banchinae:

- Agathilla Westwood, 1882
- Alloplasta Förster, 1869
- Amphirhachis Townes, 1969
- Apophua Morley, 1913
- Arenetra Holmgren, 1859
- Atropha Kriechbaumer, 1894
- Australoglypta Gauld, 1977
- Banchopsis Rudow, 1886
- Banchus Fabricius, 1798
- Cephaloglypta Obrtel, 1956
- Ceratogastra Ashmead, 1900
- Cryptopimpla Taschenberg, 1863
- Deleboea Cameron, 1903
- Diblastomorpha Förster, 1869
- Diradops Townes, 1946
- Exetastes Gravenhorst, 1829
- Glypta Gravenhorst, 1829
- Hadeleboea Ugalde & Gauld, 2002
- Hadrostethus Townes, 1969
- Hapsinotus Townes, 1970
- Helotorus Townes, 1978
- Himertosoma Schmiedeknecht, 1900
- Hylesicida Ugalde & Gauld, 2002
- Lampronota Curtis, 1832
- Leptobatopsis Ashmead, 1900
- Levibasis Townes, 1969
- Lissonota Gravenhorst, 1829
- Meniscomorpha Schmiedeknecht, 1907
- Mnioes Townes, 1946
- Occia Tosquinet, 1904
- Odinophora Förster, 1869
- Rhynchobanchus Kriechbaumer, 1894
- Rynchobanchus Kriechbaumer, 1894
- Shortia Gauld, 1984
- Sjostedtiella Szépligeti, 1908
- Sphelodon Townes, 1966
- Spilopimpla Cameron, 1904
- Syzeuctus Förster, 1869
- Teleutaea Förster, 1869
- Tetractenion Seyrig, 1932
- Tossinola Viktorov, 1958
- Zaglyptomorpha Viereck, 1913

== Other sources ==
- Aubert, J.F. (1978): Les Ichneumonides ouest-palearctiques et leurs hotes 2. Banchinae et Suppl. aux Pimplinae ["The Western Palearctic ichneumon wasps and their hosts. 2. Banchinae and supplement to the Pimplinae"]. Laboratoire d'Evolution des Etres Organises, Paris & EDIFAT-OPIDA, Echauffour. [in French]
- Townes, H.K. (1969): Genera of Ichneumonidae, Part 3 (Lycorininae, Banchinae, Scolobatinae, Porizontinae). Memoirs of the American Entomological Institute 13: 1-307.
- Townes, H.K. (1971): Genera of Ichneumonidae, Part 4 (Cremastinae, Phrudinae, Tersilochinae, Ophioninae, Mesochorinae, Metopiinae, Anomalinae, Acaenitinae, Microleptinae, Orthopelmatinae, Collyriinae, Orthocentrinae, Diplazontinae). Memoirs of the American Entomological Institute 17: 1-372.
- Townes, H.K. & Townes, M. (1978): Ichneumon-flies of America North of Mexico: 7. Subfamily Banchinae, tribes Lissonotini and Banchini. Memoirs of the American Entomological Institute 26: 1-614.
- Wahl, David (1999): Classification and Systematics of the Ichneumonidae (Hymenoptera). Version of 1999-JUL-19. Retrieved 2008-JUN-18.
