= List of Lissonota species =

This is a list of 399 species in Lissonota, a genus of ichneumon wasps in the family Ichneumonidae.

== Lissonota species ==
- Lissonota absenta Chandra & Gupta, 1977^{c g}
- Lissonota accusator (Fabricius, 1793)^{c g}
- Lissonota aciculata Townes, 1978^{c g}
- Lissonota acrobasidis (Ashmead, 1896)^{c g}
- Lissonota admontenis Strobl, 1902^{g}
- Lissonota admontensis Strobl, 1902^{c g}
- Lissonota adornata Chandra, 1976^{c g}
- Lissonota aequalis (Constantineanu & Constantineanu, 1968)^{c g}
- Lissonota albicaudata Chandra & Gupta, 1977^{c g}
- Lissonota albicoxis Kriechbaumer, 1888^{c g}
- Lissonota albipennis Townes, 1978^{c g}
- Lissonota albivitta Townes, 1978^{c g}
- Lissonota albomaculata (Cameron, 1899)^{c g}
- Lissonota albopicta Smith, 1878^{c g}
- Lissonota aleutiana (Cresson, 1879)^{c g}
- Lissonota alpestris (Cameron, 1886)^{c}
- Lissonota alpina Habermehl, 1926^{c g}
- Lissonota alpinicola Bauer, 1985^{c g}
- Lissonota alpinistor Aubert, 1978^{c g}
- Lissonota alpivagator Aubert, 1976^{c g}
- Lissonota alutacea Townes, 1978^{c g}
- Lissonota alveata Townes, 1978^{c g}
- Lissonota amabilis Habermehl, 1918^{c g}
- Lissonota amatellae Townes, 1978^{c g}
- Lissonota amphithyris Townes, 1978^{c g}
- Lissonota angulata Townes, 1978^{c g}
- Lissonota angusta Taschenberg, 1863^{c g}
- Lissonota anipta Townes, 1978^{c g}
- Lissonota anomala Holmgren, 1860^{g}
- Lissonota antennalis Thomson, 1877^{c g}
- Lissonota anthophila Townes, 1978^{c g}
- Lissonota aorba Ugalde & Gauld, 2002^{c g}
- Lissonota apprima Townes, 1978^{c g}
- Lissonota argiola Gravenhorst, 1829^{c g}
- Lissonota aspera Bain, 1970^{c g}
- Lissonota atra Bain, 1970^{c g}
- Lissonota atrella Townes, 1978^{c g}
- Lissonota atrimalis Townes, 1978^{c g}
- Lissonota atropos Schmiedeknecht, 1900^{c g}
- Lissonota aurantia Chandra, 1976^{c g}
- Lissonota axillaris Townes, 1978^{c g}
- Lissonota aziba Ugalde & Gauld, 2002^{c g}
- Lissonota azteca (Cresson, 1874)^{c g}
- Lissonota babela Ugalde & Gauld, 2002^{c g}
- Lissonota balia Townes, 1978^{c g}
- Lissonota barbator Aubert, 1972^{c g}
- Lissonota bella Chandra, 1976^{c g}
- Lissonota benoiti Townes, 1973^{c g}
- Lissonota bezaga Ugalde & Gauld, 2002^{c g}
- Lissonota bicincta Szepligeti, 1899^{c g}
- Lissonota biguttata Holmgren, 1860^{c g}
- Lissonota bilineata Gravenhorst, 1829^{c g}
- Lissonota bipartita Costa, 1886^{c g}
- Lissonota bispota Chandra & Gupta, 1977^{c g}
- Lissonota bistrigata Holmgren, 1860^{c g}
- Lissonota bivittata Gravenhorst, 1829^{c g}
- Lissonota boreliiphaga Rousse, 2016^{g}
- Lissonota brevipappus Townes, 1978^{c g}
- Lissonota breviseta Ratzeburg, 1852^{c g}
- Lissonota breviventris (Walsh, 1873)^{c g}
- Lissonota brunnea Cresson, 1868^{c g}
- Lissonota buccator (Thunberg, 1822)^{c g}
- Lissonota buolianae Hartig, 1838^{c g}
- Lissonota burmensis Chandra & Gupta, 1977^{c g}
- Lissonota busoma Chandra & Gupta, 1977^{c g}
- Lissonota calva Townes, 1978^{c g}
- Lissonota camptoneura Townes, 1978^{c g}
- Lissonota canula Ugalde & Gauld, 2002^{c g}
- Lissonota carbonaria Holmgren, 1860^{c g}
- Lissonota carinulata Sheng, 2000^{c g}
- Lissonota castaneae Chandra & Gupta, 1977^{c g}
- Lissonota catamelas Townes, 1978^{c g}
- Lissonota cephalotes Townes, 1978^{c g}
- Lissonota chelata Townes, 1978^{c g}
- Lissonota chinensis (Cushman, 1922)^{c g}
- Lissonota chosensis (Uchida, 1955)^{c}
- Lissonota clypealis Thomson, 1877^{c g}
- Lissonota clypearis Costa, 1886^{c g}
- Lissonota clypeator (Gravenhorst, 1820)^{c g}
- Lissonota coloradensis (Cresson, 1870)^{c}
- Lissonota compar Fonscolombe, 1854^{c g}
- Lissonota complicator Aubert, 1967^{c g}
- Lissonota compressa Townes, 1978^{c g}
- Lissonota compta Townes, 1978^{c g}
- Lissonota conferta Townes, 1978^{c g}
- Lissonota conflagrata Gravenhorst, 1829^{c g}
- Lissonota confusa Rey del Castillo, 1992^{c g}
- Lissonota conocola Rohwer, 1920^{c g}
- Lissonota conulla Ugalde & Gauld, 2002^{c g}
- Lissonota coracina (Gmelin, 1790)^{c g}
- Lissonota coracinata Chandra & Gupta, 1977^{c g}
- Lissonota costulata Townes, 1978^{c g}
- Lissonota cracens Townes, 1978^{c g}
- Lissonota cracentis Chandra & Gupta, 1977^{c g}
- Lissonota crevieri (Provancher, 1874)^{c g}
- Lissonota cribraria Townes, 1978^{c g}
- Lissonota crudeta Ugalde & Gauld, 2002^{c g}
- Lissonota cruentator (Panzer, 1809)^{c g}
- Lissonota cruralis Townes, 1978^{c g}
- Lissonota culiciformis Gravenhorst, 1829^{c g}
- Lissonota curticauda Townes, 1978^{c g}
- Lissonota curtiterebra Chandra & Gupta, 1977^{c g}
- Lissonota curtiventris Horstmann & Yu, 1999^{c g}
- Lissonota dakrumae (Ashmead, 1896)^{c g}
- Lissonota danielsi Chandra & Gupta, 1977^{c g}
- Lissonota daschi Townes, 1978^{c g}
- Lissonota davisi (Townes, 1944)^{c g}
- Lissonota densata Townes, 1978^{c g}
- Lissonota depressifronta Chandra & Gupta, 1977^{c g}
- Lissonota deversor Gravenhorst, 1829^{c g}
- Lissonota digestor (Thunberg, 1822)^{c g}
- Lissonota dineta Ugalde & Gauld, 2002^{c g}
- Lissonota disrupta (Cockerell, 1921)^{c g}
- Lissonota distincta Bridgman, 1889^{c g}
- Lissonota dreisbachorum Townes, 1978^{c g}
- Lissonota dubia Holmgren, 1856^{c g}
- Lissonota dusmeti (Seyrig, 1927)^{c g}
- Lissonota electra Viereck, 1903^{c g}
- Lissonota elegantissima (Hellen, 1940)^{c g}
- Lissonota elongator (Schiodte, 1839)^{c g}
- Lissonota erythrina Holmgren, 1860^{c g}
- Lissonota eurycorsa Townes, 1978^{c g}
- Lissonota evetriae Rohwer, 1920^{c g}
- Lissonota excelsa Schmiedeknecht, 1900^{c g}
- Lissonota exculta Chandra & Gupta, 1977^{c g}
- Lissonota exigua (Cresson, 1870)^{c g}
- Lissonota exilis (Cresson, 1870)^{c g}
- Lissonota exophthalmus Townes, 1978^{c g}
- Lissonota extrema Hedwig, 1932^{c g}
- Lissonota fascipennis Townes, 1978^{c g}
- Lissonota fenella Viereck, 1903^{c g}
- Lissonota filiformis Sheng, 2000^{c g}
- Lissonota fissa Brischke, 1865^{c g}
- Lissonota flavicruris Chandra & Gupta, 1977^{c g}
- Lissonota flavipectus Townes, 1978^{c g}
- Lissonota flavofasciata Chandra & Gupta, 1977^{c g}
- Lissonota flavopicta Smith, 1878^{c g}
- Lissonota flavovariegata (Lucas, 1849)^{c g}
- Lissonota fletcheri Bridgman, 1882^{c g}
- Lissonota folii Thomson, 1877^{c g}
- Lissonota freyi (Hellen, 1915)^{c g}
- Lissonota frontalis (Desvignes, 1856)^{c g}
- Lissonota fugata Ugalde & Gauld, 2002^{c g}
- Lissonota fulva Bain, 1970^{c g}
- Lissonota fulvicornis Townes, 1978^{c g}
- Lissonota fulvipes (Desvignes, 1856)^{c g}
- Lissonota fundator (Thunberg, 1822)^{c g}
- Lissonota funebris Habermehl, 1923^{c}
- Lissonota fuscifacies Chandra & Gupta, 1977^{c g}
- Lissonota fuscipes (Cameron, 1903)^{c g}
- Lissonota fuscipilis Townes, 1978^{c g}
- Lissonota genator Aubert, 1972^{c g}
- Lissonota genoplana Townes, 1978^{c g}
- Lissonota gibboclypeata Chandra, 1976^{c g}
- Lissonota giganta (Uchida, 1928)^{c g}
- Lissonota gracilenta Holmgren, 1860^{c g}
- Lissonota gracilipes Thomson, 1877^{c g}
- Lissonota granulata Chandra, 1976^{c g}
- Lissonota greeni Cameron, 1905^{c}
- Lissonota gurna Ugalde & Gauld, 2002^{c g}
- Lissonota halidayi Holmgren, 1860^{c g}
- Lissonota hamus (Uchida, 1940)^{c g}
- Lissonota heinrichi Townes, 1978^{c g}
- Lissonota heterodoxa Fonscolombe, 1854^{c g}
- Lissonota hilaris (Cresson, 1879)^{c g}
- Lissonota hildae (Gyorfi, 1941)^{c g}
- Lissonota himachala Chandra & Gupta, 1977^{c g}
- Lissonota histrio (Fabricius, 1798)^{c}
- Lissonota horpa Ugalde & Gauld, 2002^{c g}
- Lissonota hortorum Gravenhorst, 1829^{c g}
- Lissonota humerella Thomson, 1877^{c g}
- Lissonota hungarica Schmiedeknecht, 1900^{c g}
- Lissonota ibericator Aubert, 1972^{c g}
- Lissonota imitatrix (Walsh, 1873)^{c g}
- Lissonota impressor Gravenhorst, 1829^{c g}
- Lissonota inareolata Pfeffer, 1913^{c g}
- Lissonota inconspicua Schmiedeknecht, 1935^{c g}
- Lissonota inconstans Cushman, 1940^{c g}
- Lissonota incrassata Chandra & Gupta, 1977^{c g}
- Lissonota infulata Townes, 1978^{c}
- Lissonota insita (Cresson, 1870)^{c g}
- Lissonota irrasa Townes, 1978^{c g}
- Lissonota jacobi (Walley, 1942)^{c g}
- Lissonota jaei Townes, 1978^{c g}
- Lissonota japonica (Ashmead, 1906)^{c g}
- Lissonota jonathani Chandra & Gupta, 1977^{c g}
- Lissonota justina Ugalde & Gauld, 2002^{c g}
- Lissonota kaiyuanensis Uchida, 1942^{c g}
- Lissonota kamathi Chandra & Gupta, 1977^{c g}
- Lissonota kambaitensis Chandra & Gupta, 1977^{c g}
- Lissonota kircosa Chandra & Gupta, 1977^{c g}
- Lissonota kolae (Morley, 1933)^{c g}
- Lissonota kolpa Ugalde & Gauld, 2002^{c g}
- Lissonota kurilensis Uchida, 1928^{c g}
- Lissonota laeviceps Townes, 1978^{c g}
- Lissonota laevigata (Cresson, 1870)^{c g}
- Lissonota lathami Townes, 1978^{c g}
- Lissonota laticincta Townes, 1978^{c g}
- Lissonota leionotum Townes, 1978^{c g}
- Lissonota leiponeura Townes, 1978^{c g}
- Lissonota lema Ugalde & Gauld, 2002^{c g}
- Lissonota lenis Townes, 1978^{c g}
- Lissonota leptalea Townes, 1978^{c g}
- Lissonota leptura Townes, 1978^{c g}
- Lissonota leucogenys Townes, 1978^{c g}
- Lissonota leucophrys Townes, 1978^{c g}
- Lissonota leucopoda Cameron, 1886^{c g}
- Lissonota leucopus Townes, 1978^{c g}
- Lissonota leucoscelis Townes, 1978^{c g}
- Lissonota leurosa Chandra & Gupta, 1977^{c g}
- Lissonota limbata Townes, 1978^{c g}
- Lissonota linearis Gravenhorst, 1829^{c g}
- Lissonota lineata Gravenhorst, 1829^{c g}
- Lissonota lineolaris (Gmelin, 1790)^{c g}
- Lissonota lirata Townes, 1978^{c g}
- Lissonota lissolabis Townes, 1978^{c g}
- Lissonota lissonotator Aubert, 1977^{c g}
- Lissonota longigena Bauer, 1985^{c g}
- Lissonota longior Townes, 1978^{c g}
- Lissonota longispiracularis (Uchida, 1940)^{c g}
- Lissonota lophota Townes, 1978^{c g}
- Lissonota luffiator Aubert, 1969^{c g}
- Lissonota macqueeni Chandra, 1976^{c g}
- Lissonota macra (Cresson, 1870)^{c}
- Lissonota maculata Brischke, 1865^{c g}
- Lissonota maculiventris (Rohwer, 1913)^{c g}
- Lissonota magdalenae Pfankuch, 1921^{c g}
- Lissonota malaisei Chandra & Gupta, 1977^{c g}
- Lissonota manca Brauns, 1896^{c g}
- Lissonota mandschurica (Uchida, 1942)^{c g}
- Lissonota marginata (Provancher, 1873)^{c g}
- Lissonota mediterranea Seyrig, 1927^{c g}
- Lissonota mesorufa (Momoi, 1970)^{c}
- Lissonota mexicana (Cameron, 1886)^{c}
- Lissonota michaelis Rey del Castillo, 1990^{c g}
- Lissonota microstoma Townes, 1978^{c g}
- Lissonota minuenta Morley, 1913^{c g}
- Lissonota monona Ugalde & Gauld, 2002^{c g}
- Lissonota monosticta Kriechbaumer, 1900^{c g}
- Lissonota morum Morley, 1913^{c g}
- Lissonota muertae Ugalde & Gauld, 2002^{c g}
- Lissonota mulleola Chandra & Gupta, 1977^{c g}
- Lissonota multicolor Colenso, 1885^{c g}
- Lissonota mutator Aubert, 1969^{c g}
- Lissonota neixiangica Sheng, 2000^{c g}
- Lissonota nigra Brischke, 1880^{c g}
- Lissonota nigricornis (Provancher, 1873)^{c}
- Lissonota nigricorpa Chandra & Gupta, 1977^{c g}
- Lissonota nigridens Thomson, 1889^{c g}
- Lissonota nigromacra Townes, 1978^{c g}
- Lissonota nigrominiata Chandra & Gupta, 1977^{c g}
- Lissonota nigroscutellata Chandra, 1976^{c g}
- Lissonota nirna Ugalde & Gauld, 2002^{c g}
- Lissonota nishiguchii (Momoi, 1962)^{c g}
- Lissonota nitida (Gravenhorst, 1829)^{c g}
- Lissonota oblongata Chandra & Gupta, 1977^{c g}
- Lissonota obscuripes Strobl, 1902^{c g}
- Lissonota obsoleta Bridgman, 1889^{c g}
- Lissonota occidentalis (Cresson, 1870)^{c}
- Lissonota ocularis Townes, 1978^{c g}
- Lissonota oculatoria (Fabricius, 1798)^{c g}
- Lissonota oncolaba Townes, 1978^{c g}
- Lissonota orophila Townes, 1978^{c g}
- Lissonota otaruensis (Uchida, 1928)^{c}
- Lissonota pallipleuris Townes, 1978^{c g}
- Lissonota palpalis Thomson, 1889^{c g}
- Lissonota parasitellae Horstmann, 2003^{c g}
- Lissonota parva (Cresson, 1870)^{c}
- Lissonota paula Chandra & Gupta, 1977^{c g}
- Lissonota peckorum Townes, 1978^{c g}
- Lissonota pectinata (Benoit, 1955)^{c g}
- Lissonota pectinator Aubert, 1972^{c g}
- Lissonota penerecta Townes, 1978^{c g}
- Lissonota pentazona Townes, 1978^{c g}
- Lissonota perina Ugalde & Gauld, 2002^{c g}
- Lissonota persimilis (Cameron, 1886)^{c g}
- Lissonota perspicillator Gravenhorst, 1829^{c}
- Lissonota petila Townes, 1978^{c g}
- Lissonota petiolata Sheng, 2000^{c g}
- Lissonota pevola Ugalde & Gauld, 2002^{c g}
- Lissonota philippinensis Chandra & Gupta, 1977^{c g}
- Lissonota picta Boie, 1850^{c g}
- Lissonota picticoxis Schmiedeknecht, 1900^{c g}
- Lissonota pimplator (Zetterstedt, 1838)^{c g}
- Lissonota pinguicula Townes, 1978^{c g}
- Lissonota pleuralis Brischke, 1880^{c g}
- Lissonota polonica Habermehl, 1918^{c g}
- Lissonota populi Townes, 1978^{c g}
- Lissonota posticalis Townes, 1978^{c g}
- Lissonota prionoxysti (Rohwer, 1915)^{c g}
- Lissonota pristina (Brues, 1910)^{c g}
- Lissonota prolixa Chandra & Gupta, 1977^{c g}
- Lissonota proxima Fonscolombe, 1854^{c g}
- Lissonota pseudeleboea Ugalde & Gauld, 2002^{c g}
- Lissonota punctata (Cresson, 1870)^{c g}
- Lissonota punctipleuris Townes, 1978^{c g}
- Lissonota punctiventrator Aubert, 1977^{c g}
- Lissonota punctiventris Thomson, 1877^{c}
- Lissonota punctor Aubert, 1976^{c g}
- Lissonota punctulata Szepligeti, 1899^{c}
- Lissonota purpurea Seyrig, 1928^{c g}
- Lissonota pygmaea Strobl, 1902^{c g}
- Lissonota qilianica Sheng, 2006^{c g}
- Lissonota quadrata Szepligeti, 1899^{c}
- Lissonota quadrinotata Gravenhorst, 1829^{c g}
- Lissonota quinqueangularis Ratzeburg, 1852^{c g}
- Lissonota rasilis Townes, 1978^{c g}
- Lissonota reniculellae Townes, 1978^{c g}
- Lissonota risola Ugalde & Gauld, 2002^{c g}
- Lissonota robusta Ratzeburg, 1852^{c g}
- Lissonota roveba Ugalde & Gauld, 2002^{c g}
- Lissonota rubida Chandra, 1976^{c g}
- Lissonota rubrica (Cresson, 1870)^{c g b}
- Lissonota rubricosa Brischke, 1880^{c g}
- Lissonota rufescens Boie, 1850^{c g}
- Lissonota rufina Costa, 1886^{c g}
- Lissonota rufipes Brischke, 1865^{c g}
- Lissonota rufitarsis Szepligeti, 1899^{c g}
- Lissonota rugosa Chandra, 1976^{c g}
- Lissonota rushi Townes, 1978^{c g}
- Lissonota russata Townes, 1978^{c g}
- Lissonota russula Chandra & Gupta, 1977^{c g}
- Lissonota sahlbergi Hellen, 1915^{c g}
- Lissonota sakala Cushman, 1942^{c g}
- Lissonota salubria Ugalde & Gauld, 2002^{c g}
- Lissonota samuelsoni (Momoi, 1970)^{c}
- Lissonota sapinea Townes, Momoi & Townes, 1965^{c g}
- Lissonota sardanator Aubert, 1969^{c g}
- Lissonota saturator (Thunberg, 1822)^{c g}
- Lissonota saxenai Chandra & Gupta, 1977^{c g}
- Lissonota scabra Brischke, 1880^{c}
- Lissonota scabricauda Townes, 1978^{c g}
- Lissonota schmiedeknechti Smits van Burgst, 1914^{c}
- Lissonota scutellaris (Cresson, 1870)^{c}
- Lissonota sector (Thunberg, 1822)^{c g}
- Lissonota segnis (Cresson, 1879)^{c g}
- Lissonota semirufa (Desvignes, 1856)^{c}
- Lissonota semitropis Townes, 1978^{c g}
- Lissonota serrulota Sheng, 2000^{c g}
- Lissonota setosa (Geoffroy, 1785)^{c g}
- Lissonota sevina Ugalde & Gauld, 2002^{c g}
- Lissonota sexcincta (Ashmead, 1890)^{c g}
- Lissonota shenefelti Townes, 1978^{c g}
- Lissonota sheni Sheng, 2000^{c g}
- Lissonota silvatica Habermehl, 1918^{c g}
- Lissonota spilocephala Cameron, 1906^{c g}
- Lissonota spilostethus Townes, 1978^{c g}
- Lissonota stenops Townes, 1978^{c g}
- Lissonota stenostoma Townes, 1978^{c g}
- Lissonota sternalis Costa, 1886^{c g}
- Lissonota stigmator Aubert, 1972^{c g}
- Lissonota striata Sheng, 2000^{c g}
- Lissonota striatopetiolata Chandra & Gupta, 1977^{c g}
- Lissonota stygialis (Brues, 1910)^{c g}
- Lissonota subaciculata Bridgman, 1886^{c g}
- Lissonota subcalva Townes, 1978^{c g}
- Lissonota subnodifer Townes, 1978^{c g}
- Lissonota subnuda Townes, 1978^{c g}
- Lissonota sulcula Townes, 1978^{c g}
- Lissonota superbator Aubert, 1967^{c g}
- Lissonota szepligetii Dalla Torre, 1901^{c g}
- Lissonota tacnaensis (Brèthes, 1916)^{c g}
- Lissonota taeniata Townes, 1978^{c g}
- Lissonota tanyterebrata Chandra & Gupta, 1977^{c g}
- Lissonota tarsata Townes, 1978^{c g}
- Lissonota tauriscorum Strobl, 1902^{c g}
- Lissonota tegularis (Cresson, 1870)^{c g}
- Lissonota temporalis Townes, 1978^{c g}
- Lissonota tenebrosa (Brues, 1910)^{c g}
- Lissonota tenerrima Thomson, 1877^{c g}
- Lissonota tenuipes Townes, 1978^{c g}
- Lissonota terebrans Sheng, 2000^{c g}
- Lissonota tergolata Chandra & Gupta, 1977^{c g}
- Lissonota tetrazona Townes, 1978^{c g}
- Lissonota thuringiaca (Schmiedeknecht, 1900)^{c g}
- Lissonota tincta Townes, 1978^{c g}
- Lissonota tinctibasis Townes, 1978^{c g}
- Lissonota tostada Ugalde & Gauld, 2002^{c g}
- Lissonota transsylvanica Constantineanu & Ciochia, 1968^{c g}
- Lissonota transversostriata (Smits van Burgst, 1921)^{c g}
- Lissonota trichota Townes, 1978^{c g}
- Lissonota trifasciola Chandra & Gupta, 1977^{c g}
- Lissonota tristis Brischke, 1888^{c g}
- Lissonota trochanterator Aubert, 1972^{c g}
- Lissonota ulbrichtii (Ulbricht, 1909)^{c g}
- Lissonota uncata Townes, 1978^{c g}
- Lissonota ustulata Chandra & Gupta, 1977^{c g}
- Lissonota variabilis Holmgren, 1860^{c g}
- Lissonota vebena Ugalde & Gauld, 2002^{c g}
- Lissonota veris Townes, 1978^{c g}
- Lissonota versicolor Holmgren, 1860^{c g}
- Lissonota vidua Townes, 1978^{c g}
- Lissonota vincta Townes, 1978^{c g}
- Lissonota xanthofacia Chandra & Gupta, 1977^{c g}
- Lissonota xanthomus Townes, 1978^{c g}
- Lissonota xanthophrys Townes, 1978^{c g}
- Lissonota xanthopyga Holmgren, 1868^{c g}
- Lissonota xuthosoma Chandra & Gupta, 1977^{c g}
- Lissonota zonalis Townes, 1978^{c g}

Data sources: c = Catalogue of Life, g = GBIF, b = Bugguide.net
