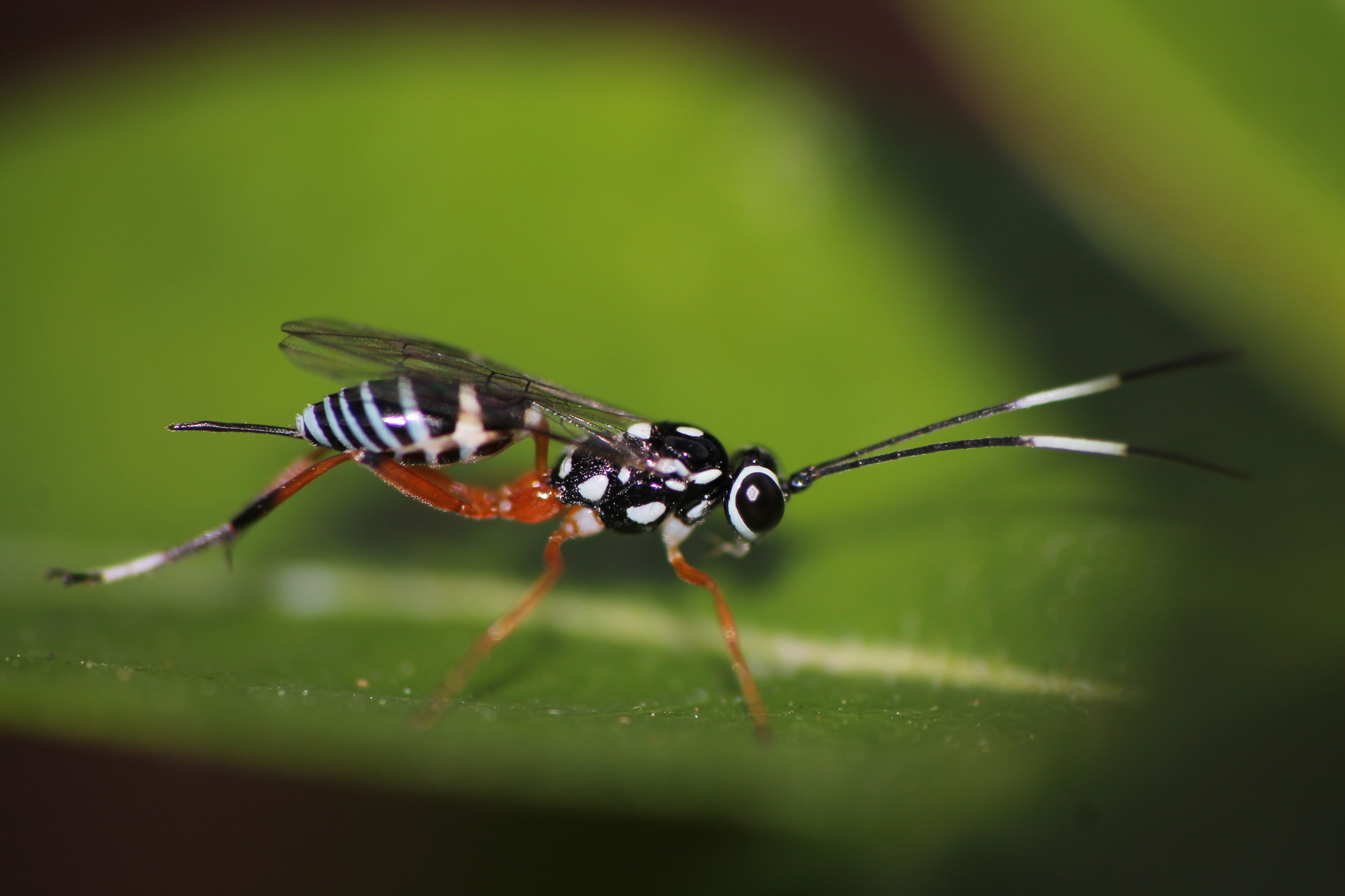

Scientific classification
- Kingdom: Animalia
- Phylum: Arthropoda
- Clade: Pancrustacea
- Class: Insecta
- Order: Hymenoptera
- Family: Ichneumonidae
- Genus: Glabridorsum
- Species: G. stokesii

Binomial name
- Glabridorsum stokesii Cameron, 1912

Synonyms
- Gambrus stokesii Cameron, 1912; Ischnus stokesii

= Glabridorsum stokesii =

Species of wasp

Glabridorsum stokesii is a species of parasitoid wasp belonging to the family Ichneumonidae first described by Peter Cameron in 1912, known to be a generalist parasite of species including crop pest species such as the codling moth and Grapholita molesta. The species is native to southeastern Australia, and has been introduced to New Zealand.

== Taxonomy ==
The species was originally named Gambrus stokesii by Peter Cameron in 1912. The species was reclassified as Ischnus stokesii by Henry Keith Townes, Marjorie Chapman Townes V. K. Gupta in 1961; reclassified a second time as Glabridorsum stokesii in 1970 by Henry Keith Townes.

== Identification ==
In New Zealand, Glabridorsum stokesii has a complete (uninterrupted) white band around the eyes, and so can be distinguished from a similar looking species, Xanthocryptus novozealandicus, where the white band is not complete.

== Distribution ==
The species is native to southeastern Australia. It was introduced to New Zealand between 1969 and 1974 as a measure to combat moth species that impacted fruit growing, and successfully established in Auckland and Hawkes Bay. By the 2020s the species had become common across both the North Island and South Island of New Zealand, and identified in the Australian states of Queensland, New South Wales, Victoria and Tasmania.

Between 1932 and 1939, attempted introductions of Gambrus stokesii were conducted in the United States as a part of pest control programmes, however the species failed to establish.

== Description ==
Below is Cameron's original description:

Black; abdominal petiole red except at apex; face, clypeus, basal half of mandibles, palpi, the orbits all round, more broadly on the malar space, the yellow there extending to the base of mandible, a broad line on sides of pronotum, inwardly extending to shortly beyond the base of the parapsidal furrows, a mark on apex of middle lobe, twice longer than wide, the base round, the apex transverse, scutellum, the apical slope of metanotum, the top gradually narrow from the outerside, tubercles, a longish triangular line on lower basal half of proplevirae, a large spot on base of mesopleurae, the top bluntly rounded, thence becoming, on the apical side, gradually widened to near the bottom, which projects into a square, the usual mark below the hind wings, a large triangular mark, the narrowed end above, on the metapleurae and the apices of all the abdominal segments, whitish-yellow. The eighth to fourteenth antennal joints white. Wings hyaline, stigma and nervures dark fuscous, the former darker in front, areolet narrowed in front, as wide there as that bounded by the recurrent and second transverse cubital nervures, the recurrent received at the base of the apical third. Pro- and mesothorax smooth, furrows crenulated, the parapsidal weakly so, sternal more strongly, the part immediately below tegulae to the yellow mark striated, the striae continued down the upper half of the furrow. Base of metanotum weakly, sparsely punctured, the rest rather strongly, weakly reticulated; second transverse keel weaker than the basal. Abdomen smooth and shining, except the second segment, which is opaque and aciculated.

Cameron's female holotype measured 7 mm (0.28 in) in length, and was found in Glen Innes, New South Wales in January, laying eggs in weevil larvae.

== Behaviour ==
Glabridorsum stokesii is a generalist parasite, known to be a parasite of the codling moth and Grapholita molesta, the oriental fruit moth.

== Parasites ==
Glabridorsum stokesii is a host to two species of parasitoid wasp, Gelis cinctus and Gelis tenellus.

== Gallery ==
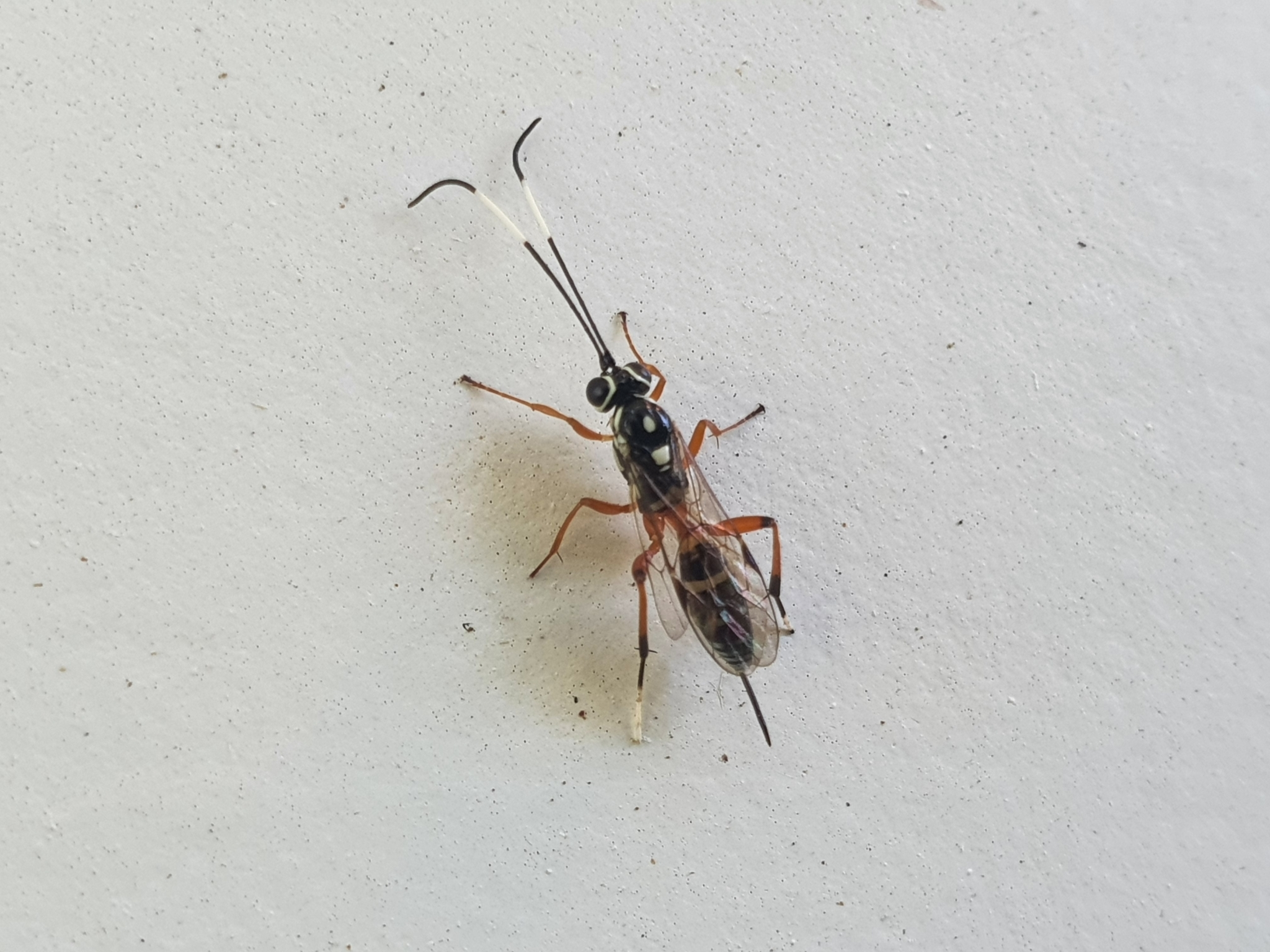
Glabridorsum stokesii found near Wellington, New Zealand

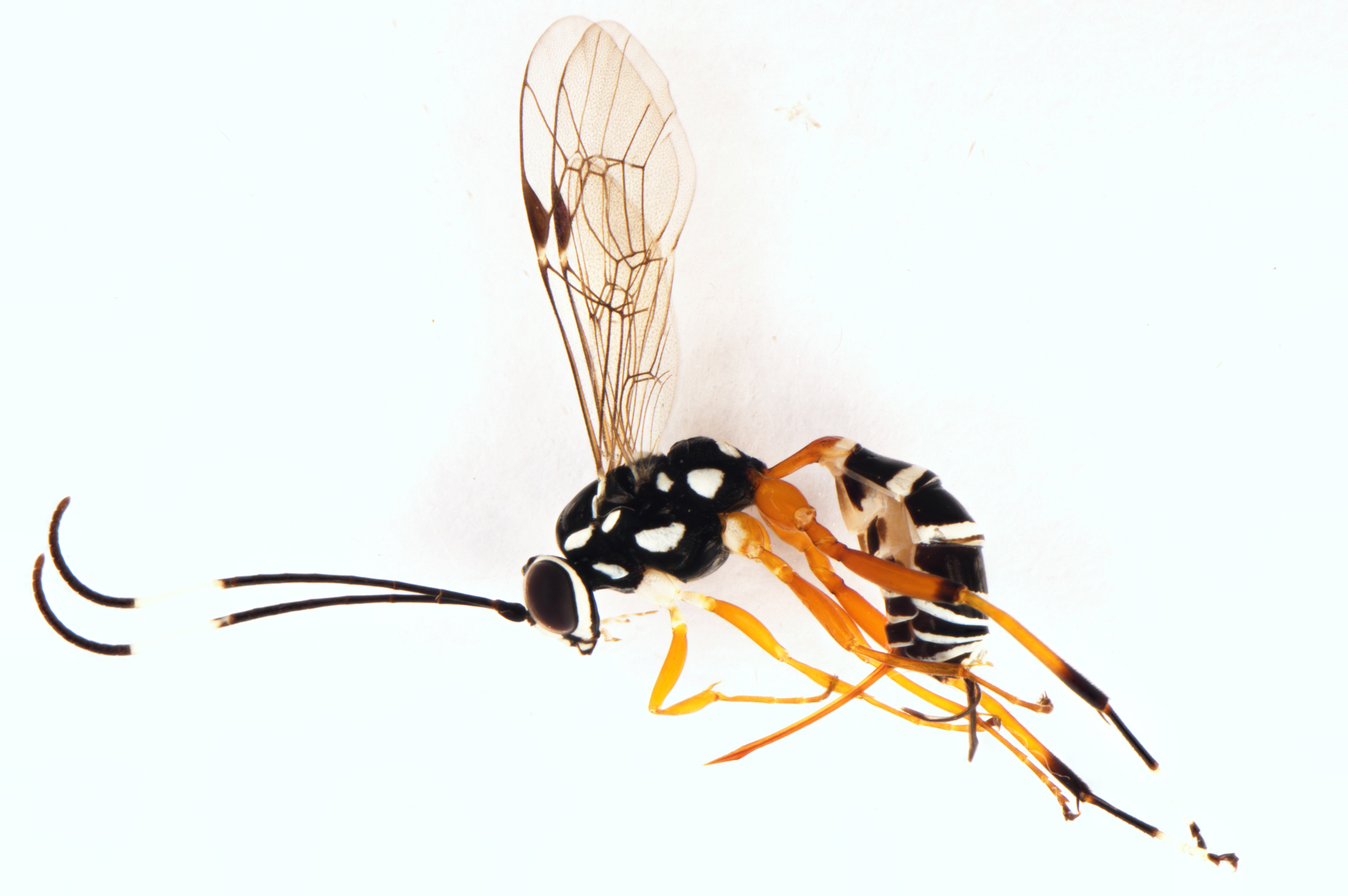
Specimen of Glabridorsum stokesii captured in Lincoln, New Zealand

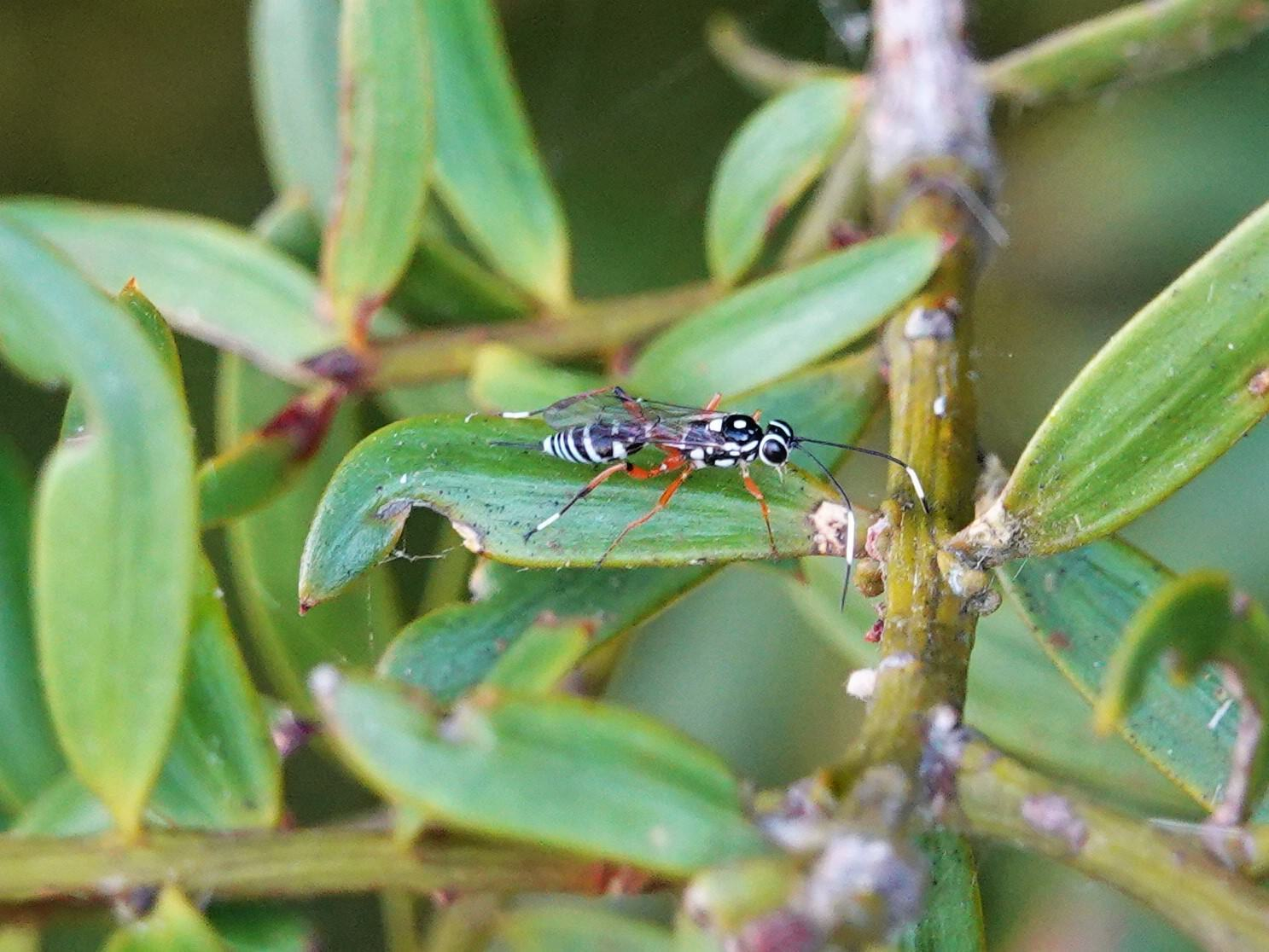
Glabridorsum stokesii found in the Waitākere Ranges, Auckland Region, New Zealand
