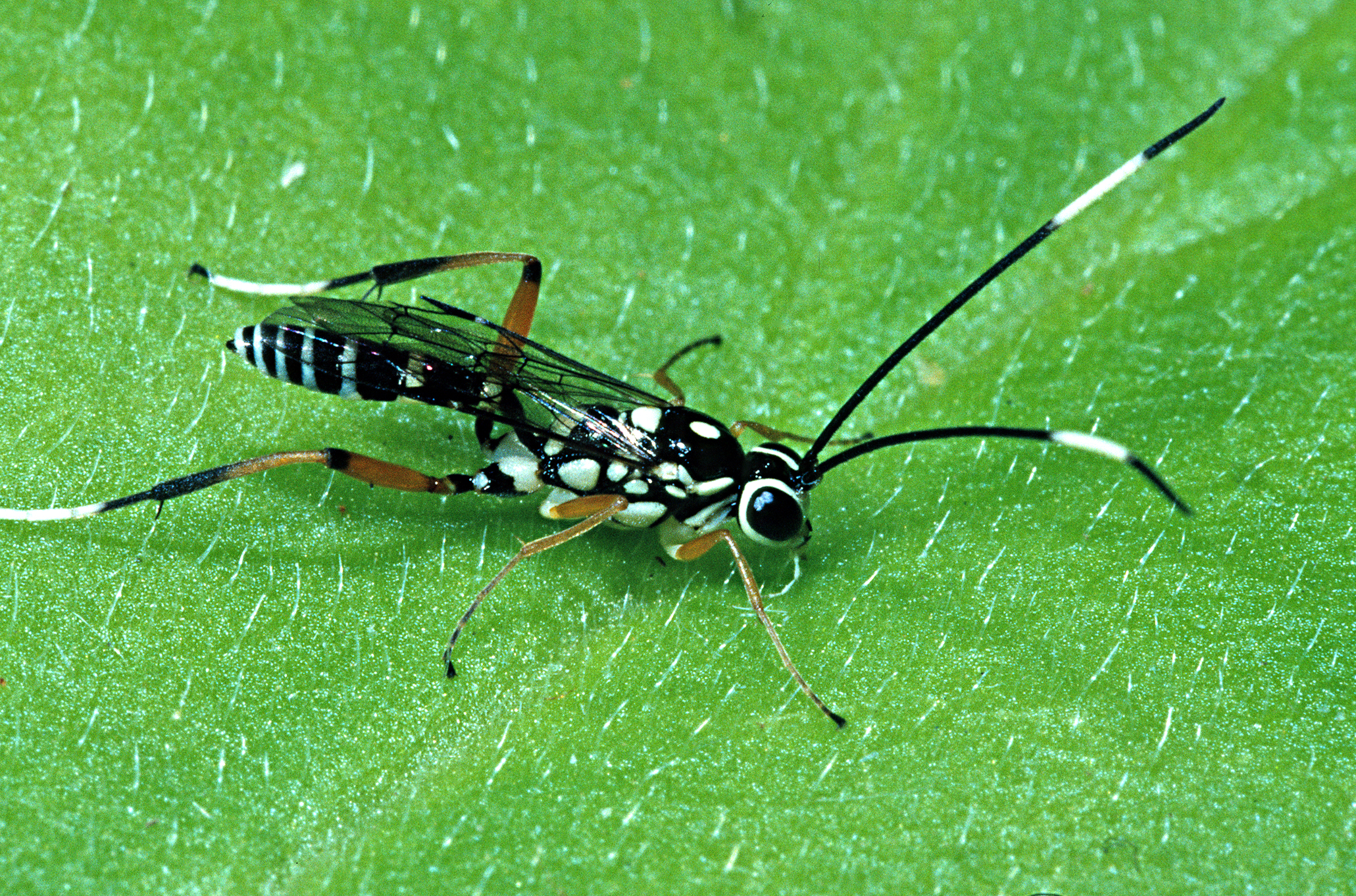
- Glabridorsum stokesii

Scientific classification
- Domain: Eukaryota
- Kingdom: Animalia
- Phylum: Arthropoda
- Class: Insecta
- Order: Hymenoptera
- Family: Ichneumonidae
- Genus: Glabridorsum; Townes, 1970

= Glabridorsum =

Species of gastropod

Glabridorsum is a genus of parasitoid wasps in the family Ichneumonidae. The genus was first described by Henry Keith Townes in 1970, and is known to occur in Australia, New Zealand, India, Nepal and Japan.

== Species ==
Species within the genus Glabridorsum include:

- Glabridorsum acroclitae Kusigemati, 1982
- Glabridorsum glabrosum Jonathan, 2000
- Glabridorsum japonicum Watanabe, 2020
- Glabridorsum linneae Kittel, 2016
- Glabridorsum nepalense Jonathan, 2000
- Glabridorsum orbitale Jonathan, 2000
- Glabridorsum punctatum Jonathan, 2000
- Glabridorsum semilunatum Jonathan, 2000
- Glabridorsum simile Kusigemati, 1982
- Glabridorsum simulatum Jonathan, 2000
- Glabridorsum stokesii (Cameron, 1912)
- Glabridorsum varibalteatum Jonathan, 2000
