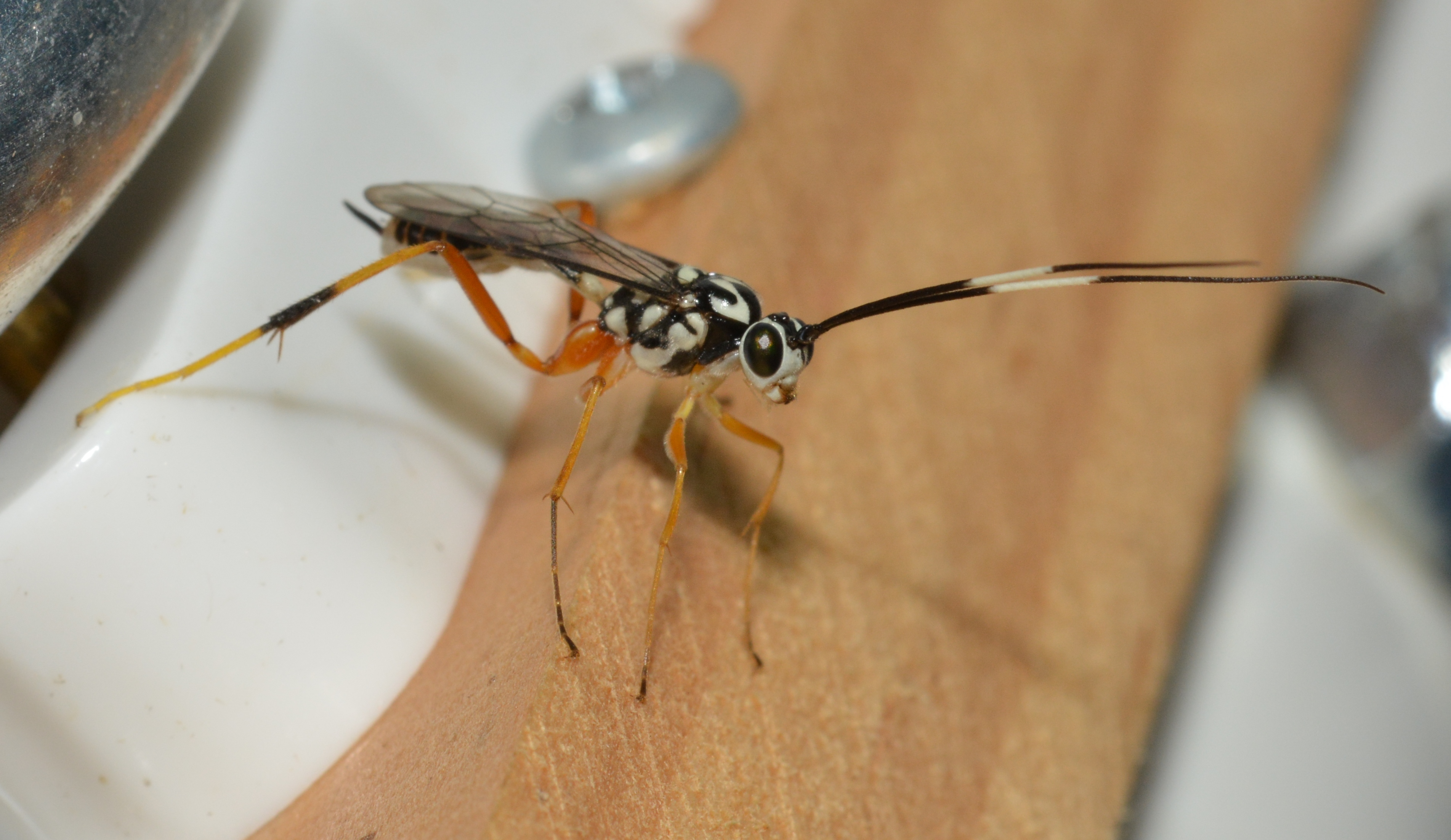
- Diradops bethunei

Scientific classification
- Domain: Eukaryota
- Kingdom: Animalia
- Phylum: Arthropoda
- Class: Insecta
- Order: Hymenoptera
- Family: Ichneumonidae
- Subfamily: Banchinae
- Genus: Diradops; Townes, 1946

= Diradops =

Genus of wasps

Diradops is a genus of parasitoid wasps belonging to the family Ichneumonidae. Diradops contains at least 35 species.
