= Lycorina =

Scientific classification
- Kingdom: Animalia
- Phylum: Arthropoda
- Class: Insecta
- Order: Hymenoptera
- Family: Ichneumonidae
- Subfamily: Lycorininae; Cushman & Rohwer, 1920
- Genus: Lycorina; Holmgren, 1859

Synonyms
- Genus-level: Gonioglyphus; Toxophoroides

Genus of wasps

Lycorininae is a monotypic subfamily of ichneumon wasps. The mere thirty species or so comprise the single genus Lycorina. In older sources, they may be included in the Banchinae.

They are parasitoids of larval Lepidoptera in leaf rolls. Distribution is worldwide.
