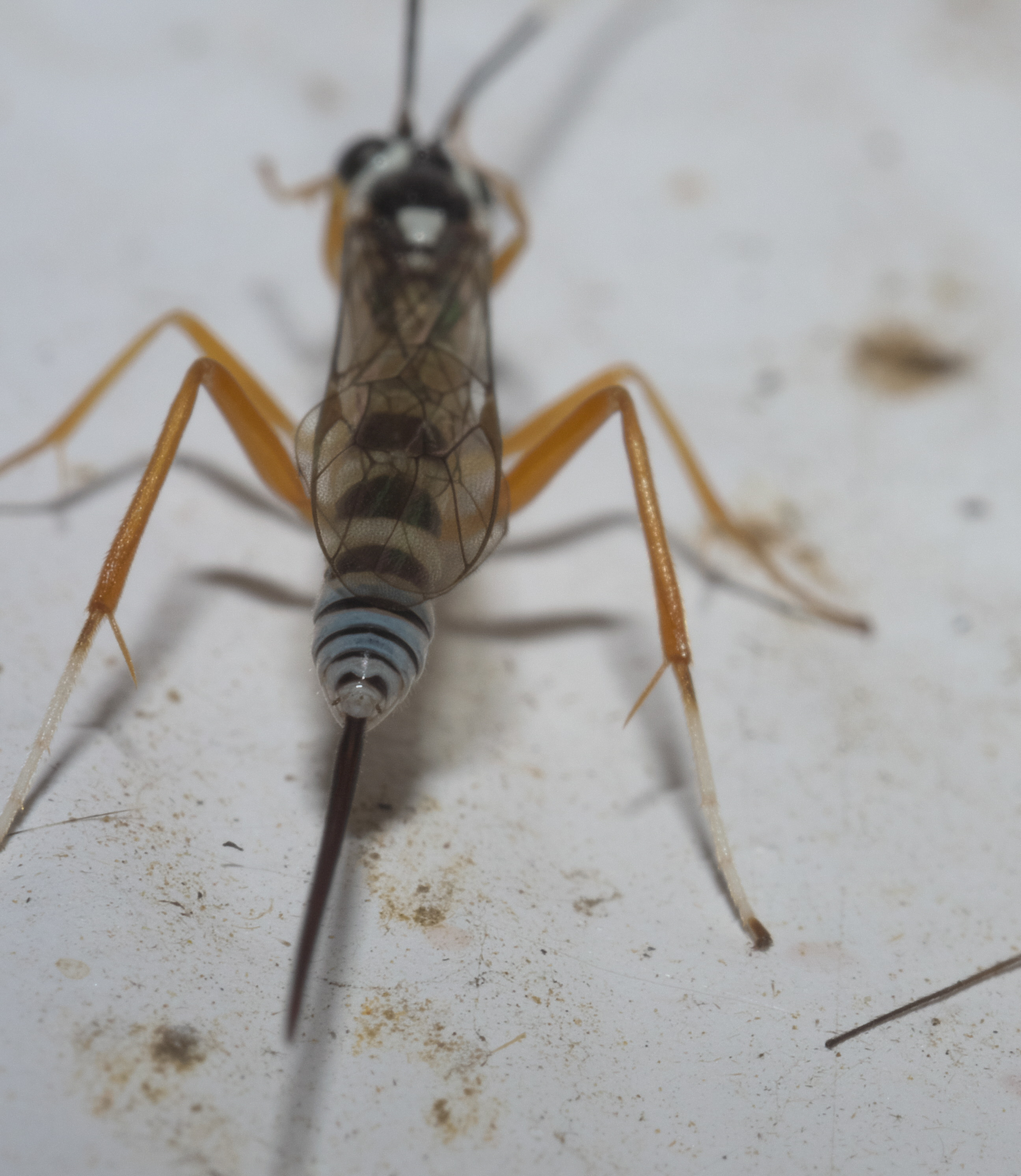
- Sphelodon phoxopteridis

Scientific classification
- Kingdom: Animalia
- Phylum: Arthropoda
- Class: Insecta
- Order: Hymenoptera
- Family: Ichneumonidae
- Tribe: Glyptini
- Genus: Sphelodon; Townes, 1966

= Sphelodon =

Genus of wasps

Sphelodon is a genus of ichneumon wasps in the family Ichneumonidae. There are about nine described species in Sphelodon.

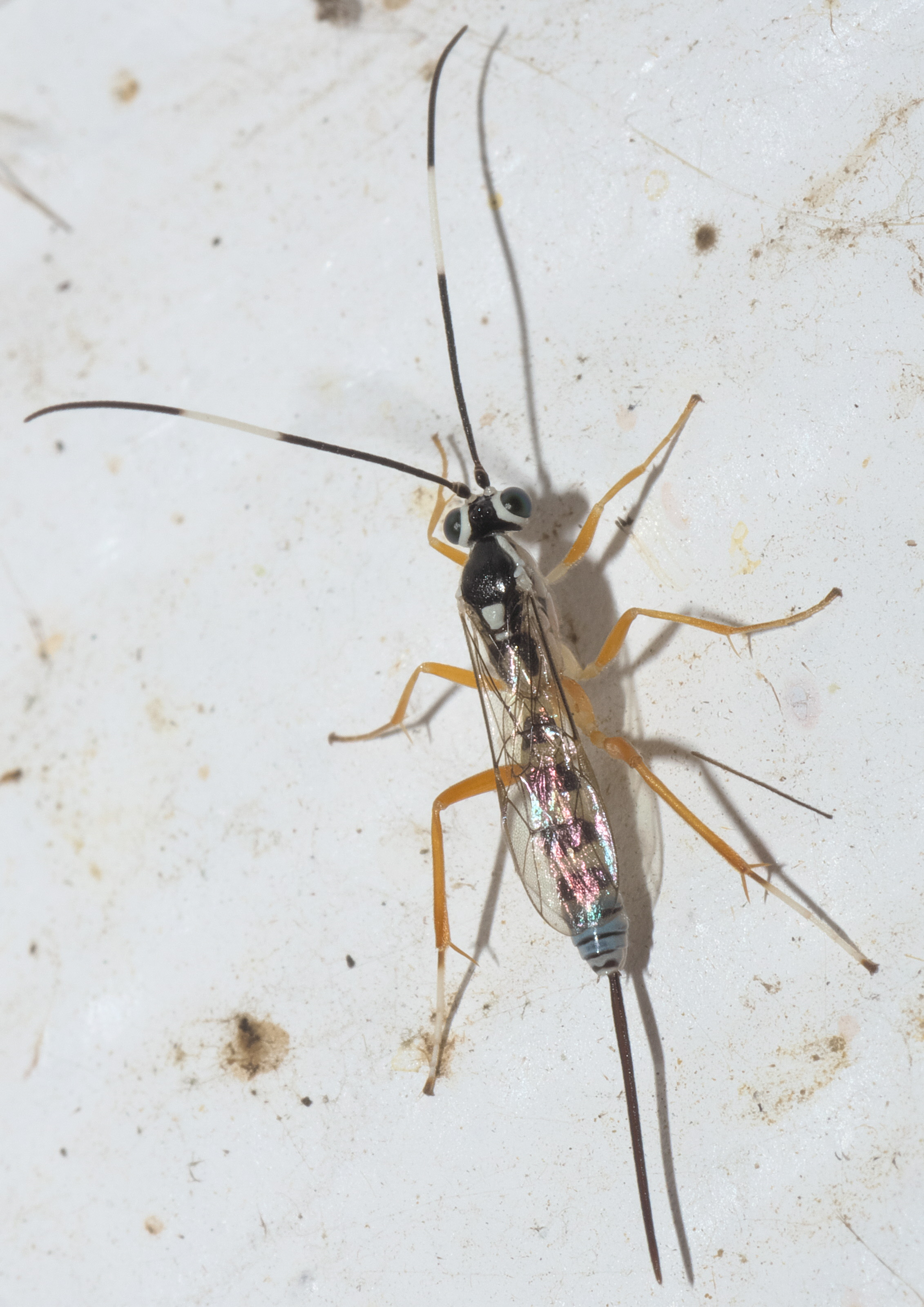
Sphelodon phoxopteridis

== Species ==
These nine species belong to the genus Sphelodon:

- Sphelodon annulicornis (Morley, 1914)^{c g}
- Sphelodon antioquensis Herrera-Florez, 2017^{g}
- Sphelodon beameri Dasch, 1988^{c g}
- Sphelodon concolor Dasch, 1988^{c g}
- Sphelodon guanacastensis Godoy & Gauld, 2002^{c g}
- Sphelodon nomene (Davis, 1898)^{c g}
- Sphelodon phoxopteridis (Weed, 1888)^{c g b}
- Sphelodon ugaldei Godoy & Gauld, 2002^{c g}
- Sphelodon wardae Godoy & Gauld, 2002^{c g}

Data sources: i = ITIS, c = Catalogue of Life, g = GBIF, b = Bugguide.net
