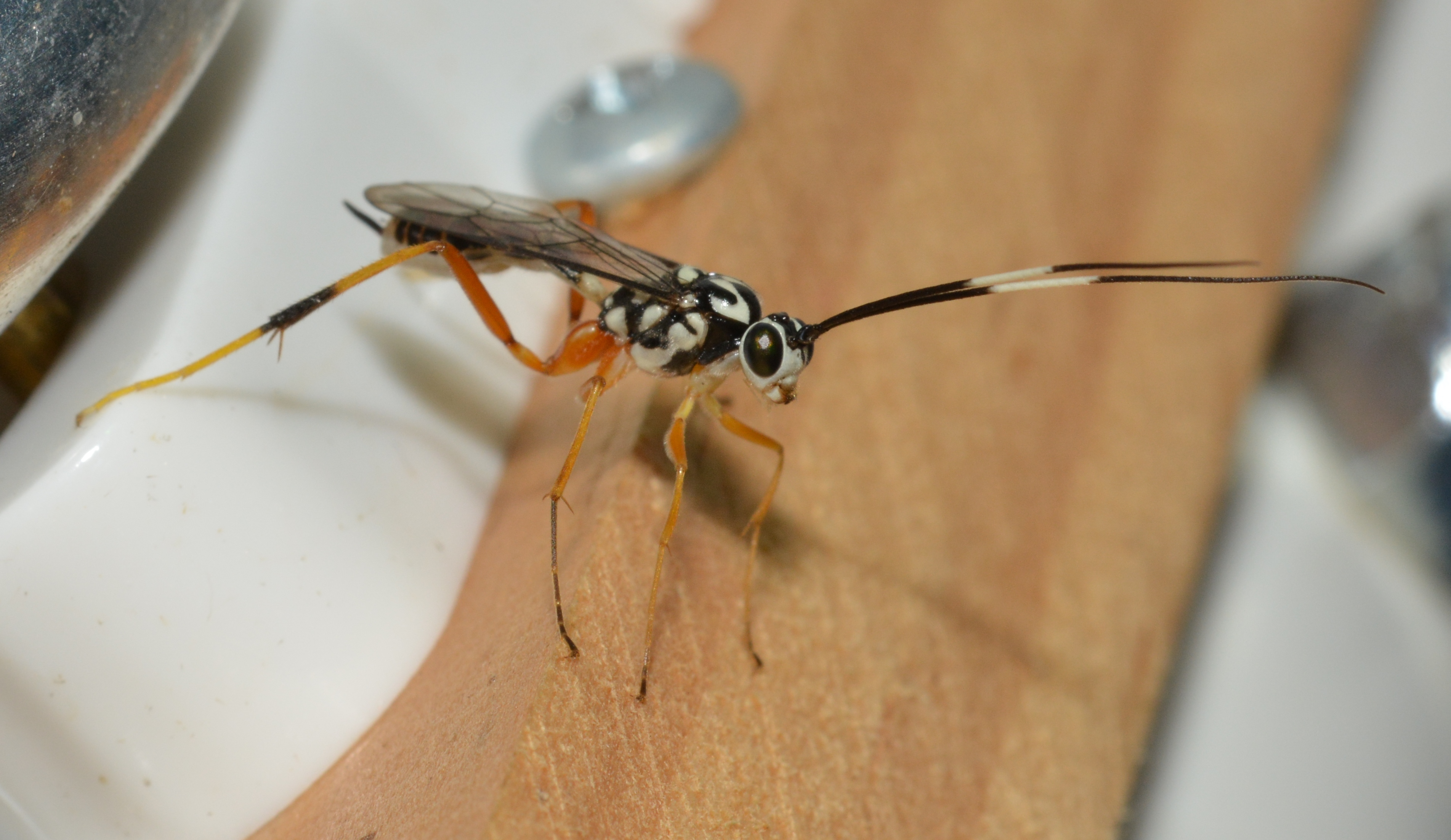

Scientific classification
- Domain: Eukaryota
- Kingdom: Animalia
- Phylum: Arthropoda
- Class: Insecta
- Order: Hymenoptera
- Family: Ichneumonidae
- Genus: Diradops
- Species: D. bethunei

Binomial name
- Diradops bethunei (Cresson, 1886)

= Diradops bethunei =

Species of wasp

Diradops bethunei is a species of ichneumon wasp in the family Ichneumonidae.
