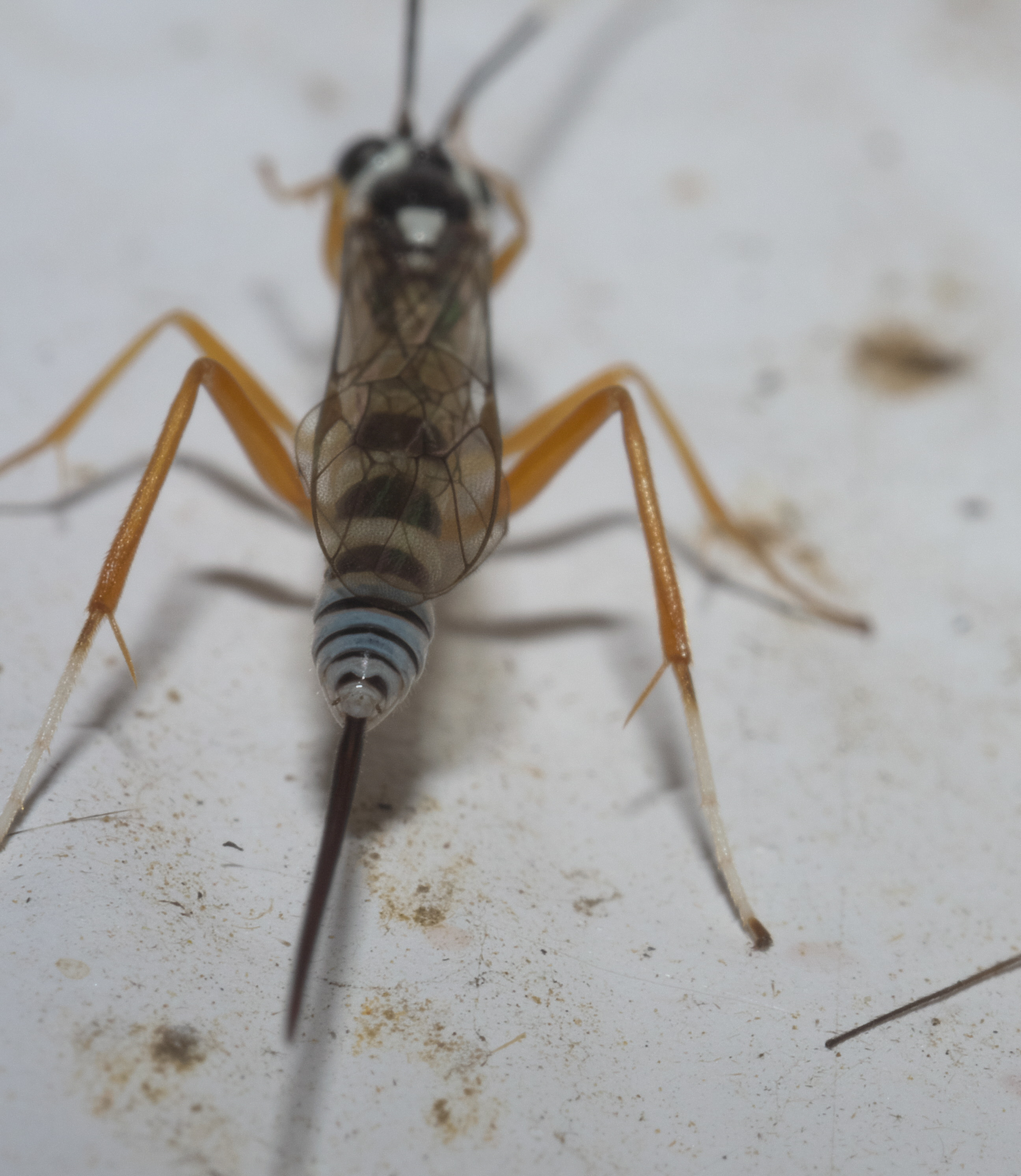

Scientific classification
- Kingdom: Animalia
- Phylum: Arthropoda
- Class: Insecta
- Order: Hymenoptera
- Family: Ichneumonidae
- Genus: Sphelodon
- Species: S. phoxopteridis

Binomial name
- Sphelodon phoxopteridis (Weed, 1888)

= Sphelodon phoxopteridis =

Species of wasp

Sphelodon phoxopteridis is a species of parasitoid wasp in the family Ichneumonidae.

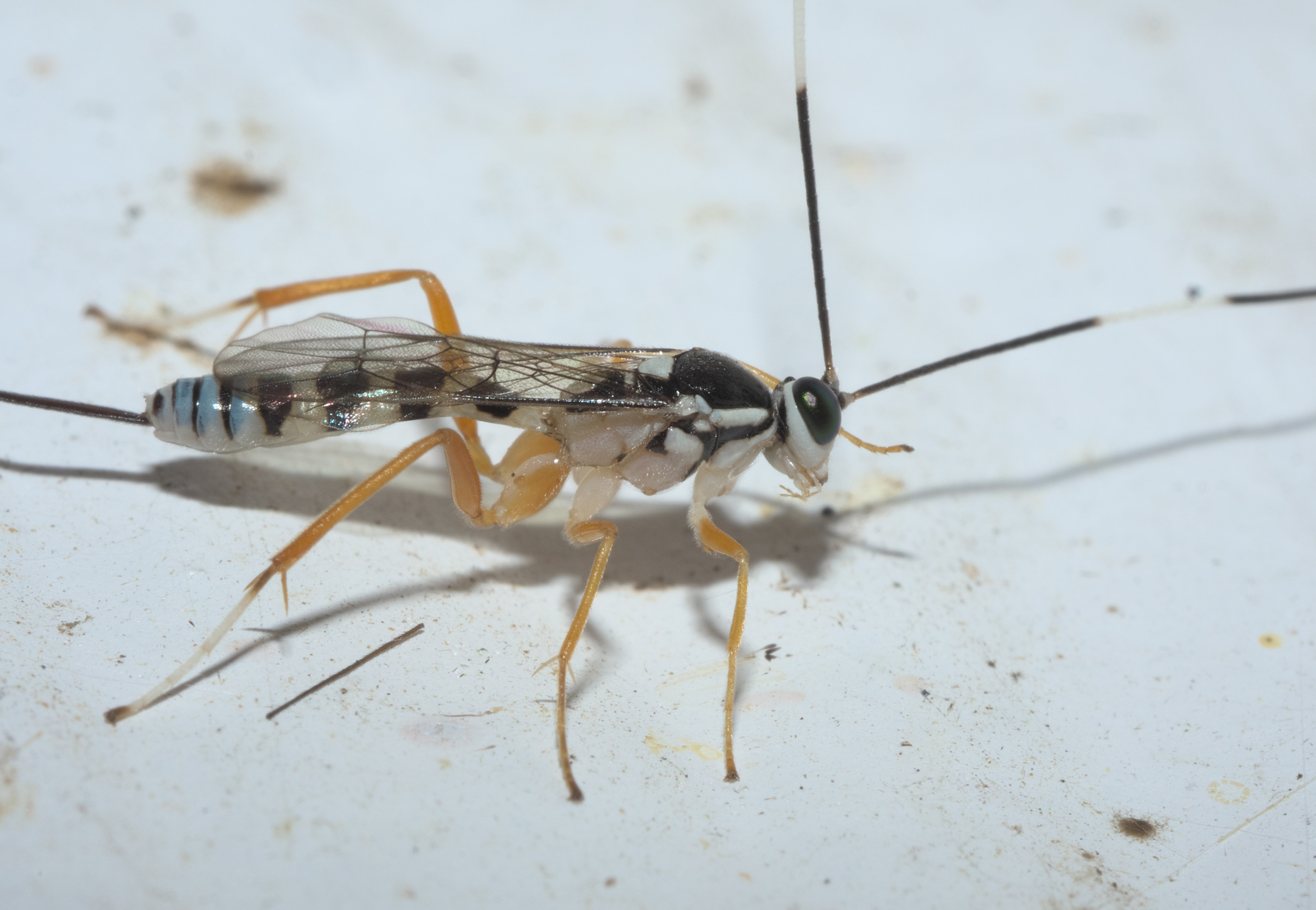

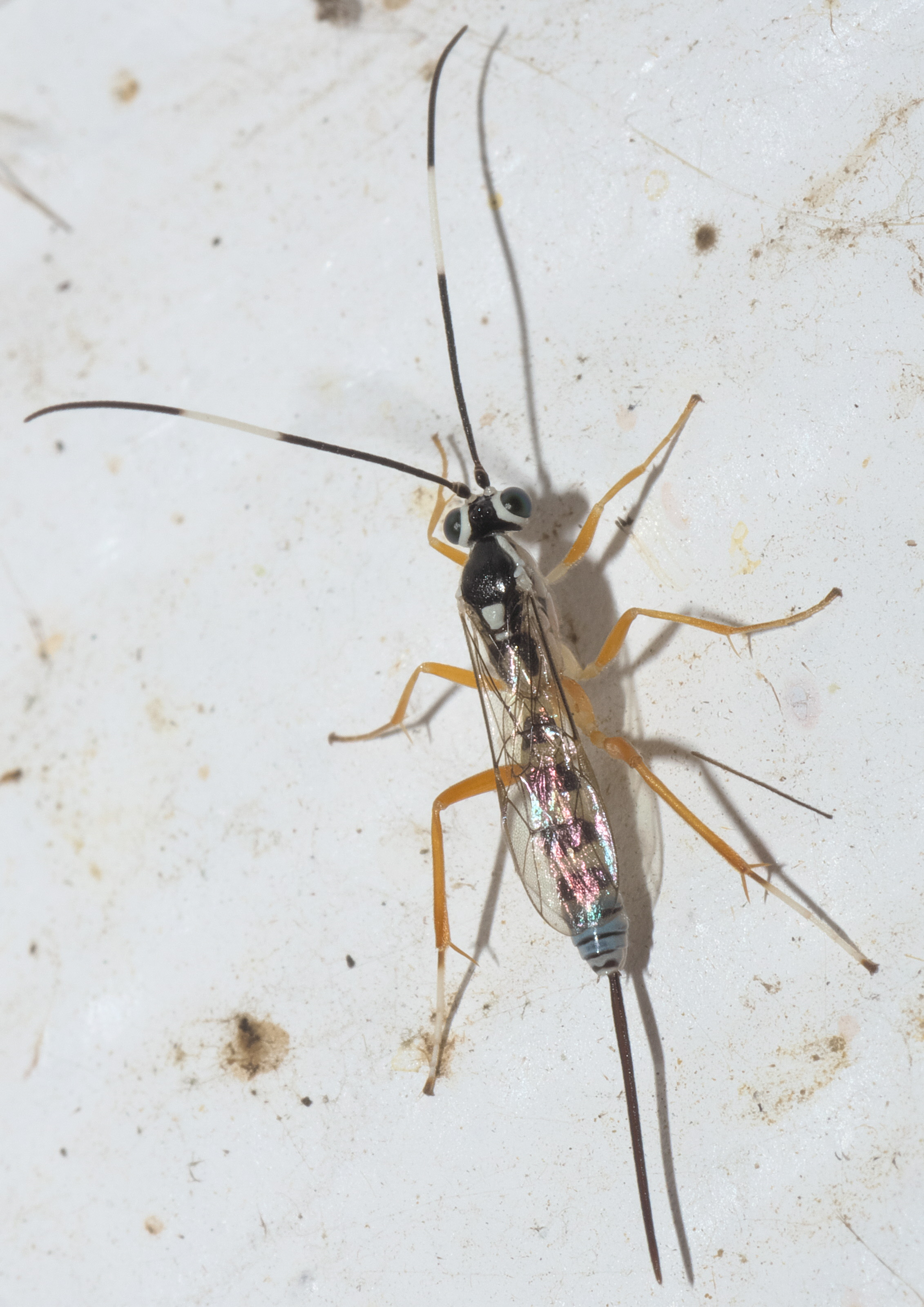
