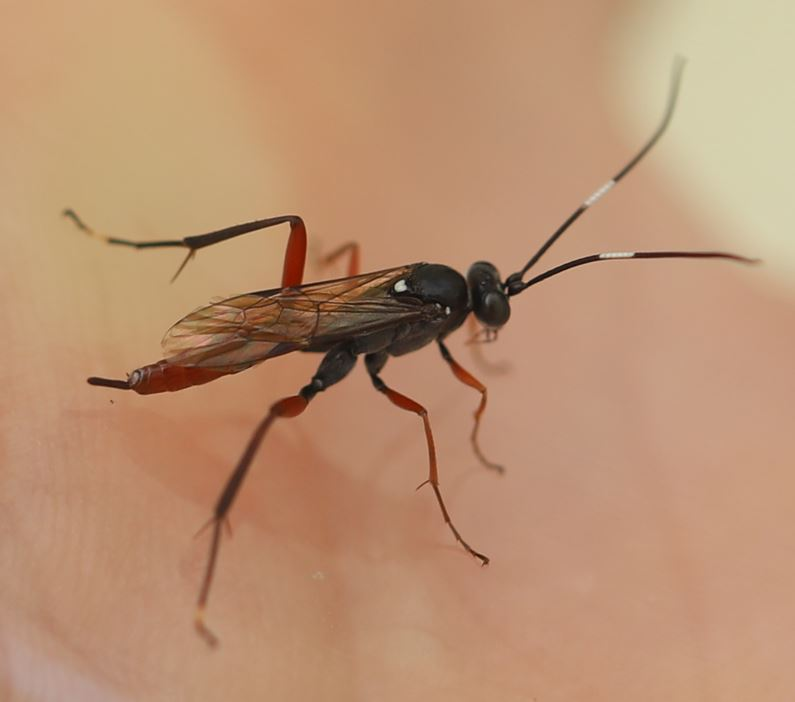
- Exetastes adpressorius

Scientific classification
- Kingdom: Animalia
- Phylum: Arthropoda
- Clade: Pancrustacea
- Class: Insecta
- Order: Hymenoptera
- Family: Ichneumonidae
- Subfamily: Banchinae
- Tribe: Banchini
- Genus: Exetastes; Gravenhorst, 1829

Type species
- Exetastes ichneumoniformis Gravenhorst, 1829

= Exetastes =

Genus of wasps

Exetastes is a genus of parasitoid wasps belonging to the family Ichneumonidae.

The genus was first described by Johann Ludwig Christian Gravenhorst in 1829.

The genus has cosmopolitan distribution.

Species:

- Exetastes adpressorius (Thunberg, 1822)
- Exetastes albiger Kriechbaumer, 1886
- Exetastes albimarginalis Watanabe, 2020
- Exetastes atrator (Förster, 1771)
- Exetastes bimaculatus (Uchida, 1928)
- Exetastes compressus Watanabe & Sheng, 2018
- Exetastes crousae Kittel, 2016
- Exetastes fornicator (Fabricius, 1781)
- Exetastes fukuchiyamanus Uchida, 1928
- Exetastes ichneumoniformis Gravenhorst, 1829
- Exetastes ishikawensis Uchida, 1928
