= Lissonota impressor =

Scientific classification
- Domain: Eukaryota
- Kingdom: Animalia
- Phylum: Arthropoda
- Class: Insecta
- Order: Hymenoptera
- Family: Ichneumonidae
- Genus: Lissonota
- Species: L. impressor

Binomial name
- Lissonota impressor Gravenhorst, 1829

Species of wasp

Lissonota impressor is a species of insect belonging to the family Ichneumonidae.

It is native to Northern Europe and Central Europe.
