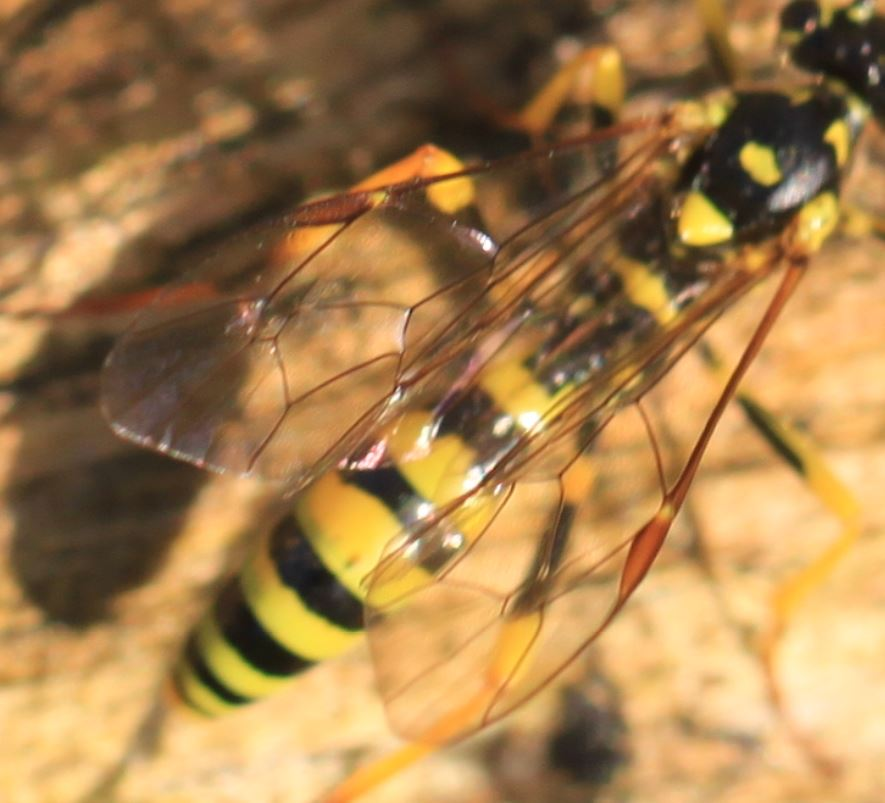
- Banchus crefeldensis

Scientific classification
- Domain: Eukaryota
- Kingdom: Animalia
- Phylum: Arthropoda
- Class: Insecta
- Order: Hymenoptera
- Family: Ichneumonidae
- Subfamily: Banchinae
- Genus: Banchus; Fabricius, 1798

= Banchus =

Genus of wasps

Banchus is a genus of parasitoid wasps belonging to the family Ichneumonidae.

The genus was first described by Fabricius in 1798.

The species of this genus are found in Europe, North America, and Asia.

Species:

- Banchus dilatatorius
- Banchus falcatorius
- Banchus hastator
- Banchus japonicus
- Banchus palpalis
- Banchus poppiti
- Banchus sanjozanus
- Banchus volutatorius
