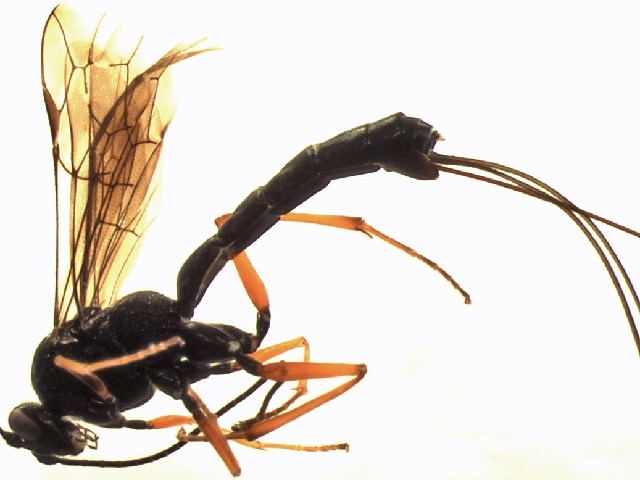
- Glypta arctica

Scientific classification
- Domain: Eukaryota
- Kingdom: Animalia
- Phylum: Arthropoda
- Class: Insecta
- Order: Hymenoptera
- Family: Ichneumonidae
- Subfamily: Banchinae
- Tribe: Glyptini
- Genus: Glypta; Gravenhorst, 1829

= Glypta =

Genus of parasitoid wasps

Glypta is a genus of parasitoid wasps belonging to the family Ichneumonidae.

Species include:

- Glypta albanica
- Glypta abbreviata Dasch, 1988
- Glypta abrupta Dasch, 1988
- Glypta acares Momoi, 1965
- Glypta accentuata Dasch, 1988
- Glypta aclerivora Dasch, 1988
- Glypta adachii Uchida, 1928
- Glypta adornata Dasch, 1988
- Glypta aequorea Dasch, 1988
- Glypta alameda Dasch, 1988
- Glypta alaskensis Dasch, 1988
- Glypta albanica Habermehl, 1926
- Glypta alberta Dasch, 1988
- Glypta albifaciens Dasch, 1988
- Glypta albilineata Dasch, 1988
- Glypta albitibia Dasch, 1988
- Glypta albonotata Dasch, 1988
- Glypta algida Dasch, 1988
- Glypta alpestris Dasch, 1988
- Glypta altamirai Godoy & Gauld, 2002
- Glypta alternata Dasch, 1988
- Glypta amabilis Dasch, 1988
- Glypta ambigua Dasch, 1988
- Glypta amoena Dasch, 1988
- Glypta angelica Dasch, 1988
- Glypta angulata Dasch, 1988
- Glypta angusta Dasch, 1988
- Glypta animalcula Shestakov, 1927
- Glypta animosa Cresson, 1870
- Glypta antiochensis Dasch, 1988
- Glypta antonioi Godoy & Gauld, 2002
- Glypta applanata Dasch, 1988
- Glypta aprilis Viereck, 1905
- Glypta aquila Chiu, 1965
- Glypta arctata Dasch, 1988
- Glypta arctica Dasch, 1988
- Glypta arcuata Dasch, 1988
- Glypta areolata Viereck, 1903
- Glypta argyrotaeniae Dasch, 1988
- Glypta aridella Dasch, 1988
- Glypta asperata Dasch, 1988
- Glypta atrata Dasch, 1988
- Glypta aurea Godoy & Gauld, 2002
- Glypta aurora Brues, 1910
- Glypta australis Dasch, 1988
- Glypta bakeri Dasch, 1988
- Glypta banffensis Dasch, 1988
- Glypta barri Dasch, 1988
- Glypta bequaerti Dasch, 1988
- Glypta biauriculata Strobl, 1901
- Glypta bicarinata Dasch, 1988
- Glypta bifoveolata Gravenhorst, 1829
- Glypta bisinuata Momoi, 1963
- Glypta blandita Dasch, 1988
- Glypta boharti Dasch, 1988
- Glypta borealis Cresson, 1870
- Glypta bradleyi Dasch, 1988
- Glypta brevipetiolata Thomson, 1889
- Glypta breviterebra Momoi, 1963
- Glypta breviungulata Kuslitzky, 1876
- Glypta buccata Dasch, 1988
- Glypta bugaczensis Kiss, 1926
- Glypta bulbosa Dasch, 1988
- Glypta bungeae Kittel, 2016
- Glypta buolianae Dasch, 1988
- Glypta calianensis Constantineanu & Voicu, 1875
- Glypta californica Provancher, 1886
- Glypta caliginosa Dasch, 1988
- Glypta calva Dasch, 1988
- Glypta canadensis Cresson, 1870
- Glypta carinifrons Dasch, 1988
- Glypta carlsoni Dasch, 1988
- Glypta carolellae Dasch, 1988
- Glypta caryae Dasch, 1988
- Glypta caucasica Telenga, 1929
- Glypta caudata Thomson, 1889
- Glypta caulicola Cushman, 1933
- Glypta ceratites Gravenhorst, 1829
- Glypta cesta Dasch, 1988
- Glypta chinensis Uchida, 1952
- Glypta choristoneurae Dasch, 1988
- Glypta ciliata Schiodte, 1839
- Glypta clypeata Kuslitzky, 2007
- Glypta cockerelli Dasch, 1988
- Glypta cognata
- Glypta colfaxiana Dasch, 1988
- Glypta collina Dasch, 1988
- Glypta coloradana Dasch, 1988
- Glypta columbiana Dasch, 1988
- Glypta concava Dasch, 1988
- Glypta concisa Dasch, 1988
- Glypta concolor Ratzeburg, 1844
- Glypta conflictanae Dasch, 1988
- Glypta confragosa Dasch, 1988
- Glypta confusa Dasch, 1988
- Glypta consimilis Holmgren, 1860
- Glypta contrasta Dasch, 1988
- Glypta convexa Dasch, 1988
- Glypta cornigera Dasch, 1988
- Glypta cornuta Brischke, 1865
- Glypta costata Dasch, 1988
- Glypta costulata Kuslitzky, 2007
- Glypta crassa Dasch, 1988
- Glypta crebraria Dasch, 1988
- Glypta cudonigerae Dasch, 1988
- Glypta cuericiensis Godoy & Gauld, 2002
- Glypta curta Dasch, 1988
- Glypta cyclostoma Szepligeti, 1898
- Glypta cylindrator Fabricius, 1787
- Glypta cymolomiae Uchida, 1932
- Glypta daisetsuzana
- Glypta dakota Cresson, 1870
- Glypta davisii Dalla Torre, 1901
- Glypta decepta Dasch, 1988
- Glypta decora Dasch, 1988
- Glypta deflexa Dasch, 1988
- Glypta deleta Dasch, 1988
- Glypta delicata Dasch, 1988
- Glypta delicatula Kuslitzky, 2007
- Glypta densa Momoi, 1970
- Glypta densepunctata
- Glypta dentata Golovisnin, 1928
- Glypta dentifera Thomson, 1889
- Glypta depressa Dasch, 1988
- Glypta deserta Kuslitzky, 1976
- Glypta diminuta Dasch, 1988
- Glypta divaricata Say, 1835
- Glypta diversipes Walsh, 1873
- Glypta divisa Dasch, 1988
- Glypta dorsiatomanae Dasch, 1988
- Glypta dreisbachi Dasch, 1988
- Glypta dubia Ratzeburg, 1852
- Glypta dupla Dasch, 1988
- Glypta eberhardi Godoy & Gauld, 2002
- Glypta ecostata Szepligeti, 1898
- Glypta egregiafovea Viereck, 1905
- Glypta ejuncida Dasch, 1988
- Glypta elevata Dasch, 1988
- Glypta elongata Holmgren, 1860
- Glypta enigmatica Dasch, 1988
- Glypta epiblemae Dasch, 1988
- Glypta epinotiae Dasch, 1988
- Glypta erratica Cresson, 1870
- Glypta erugata Dasch, 1988
- Glypta eucosmae Walley & Barron, 1977
- Glypta evansi Dasch, 1988
- Glypta evetriae Cushman, 1917
- Glypta exartemae Walley, 1934
- Glypta exigua Dasch, 1988
- Glypta exophthalmus Kriechbaumer, 1887
- Glypta exposita Dasch, 1988
- Glypta extensor Dasch, 1988
- Glypta extincta Ratzeburg, 1852
- Glypta faceta Dasch, 1988
- Glypta fasciata Dasch, 1988
- Glypta femorator Desvignes, 1856
- Glypta ferruginea Dasch, 1988
- Glypta filicauda Dasch, 1988
- Glypta flagellaris Kuslitzky, 1973
- Glypta flaviscutator Aubert, 1964
- Glypta flavitarsus
- Glypta flavomaculata Dasch, 1988
- Glypta flavopicta Dasch, 1988
- Glypta floridana Dasch, 1988
- Glypta foutsi Dasch, 1988
- Glypta franciscana Dasch, 1988
- Glypta fronticornis Gravenhorst, 1829
- Glypta fulgida Dasch, 1988
- Glypta fulvipes Schiodte, 1839
- Glypta fumiferanae Viereck, 1912
- Glypta fumosa Dasch, 1988
- Glypta furcata Dasch, 1988
- Glypta fuscata Dasch, 1988
- Glypta fuscitibia Dasch, 1988
- Glypta gainesiana Dasch, 1988
- Glypta gelida Dasch, 1988
- Glypta georgiana Dasch, 1988
- Glypta georginensis Godoy & Gauld, 2002
- Glypta glabra Dasch, 1988
- Glypta glacialis Dasch, 1988
- Glypta glypta Ashmead, 1906
- Glypta gouldiana Dasch, 1988
- Glypta gracilis Hellen, 1915
- Glypta griseldae Dasch, 1988
- Glypta haesitator Gravenhorst, 1829
- Glypta hastata Dasch, 1988
- Glypta heinrichi Dasch, 1988
- Glypta herschelana Dasch, 1988
- Glypta heterocera Thomson, 1889
- Glypta hondoana Dasch, 1988
- Glypta hoodiana Dasch, 1988
- Glypta humilis Spinola, 1851
- Glypta ichitai
- Glypta ignota Dasch, 1988
- Glypta imitator Dasch, 1988
- Glypta implana Dasch, 1988
- Glypta impressa Davis, 1898
- Glypta improba Dasch, 1988
- Glypta improcera Dasch, 1988
- Glypta incisa Gravenhorst, 1829
- Glypta incognita Dasch, 1988
- Glypta incompleta Dasch, 1988
- Glypta inculta Dasch, 1988
- Glypta indivisa Dasch, 1988
- Glypta infrequens Dasch, 1988
- Glypta infumata Walley, 1934
- Glypta insignis Dasch, 1988
- Glypta interrupta Dasch, 1988
- Glypta interstincta Dasch, 1988
- Glypta inusitata Dasch, 1988
- Glypta ithacensis Dasch, 1988
- Glypta jacintana Dasch, 1988
- Glypta juncta Dasch, 1988
- Glypta juxta Dasch, 1988
- Glypta kamijoi Momoi, 1966
- Glypta kansensis Dasch, 1988
- Glypta karasawensis
- Glypta kasparyani Kuslitzky, 1976
- Glypta kincaidi Dasch, 1988
- Glypta kozlovi Kuslitzky, 1976
- Glypta kukakensis Ashmead, 1902
- Glypta kunashirica Kuslitzky, 2007
- Glypta laevis Dasch, 1988
- Glypta lapponica Holmgren, 1860
- Glypta lata Dasch, 1988
- Glypta latigaster Dasch, 1988
- Glypta lenis Dasch, 1988
- Glypta lepida Dasch, 1988
- Glypta limatula Dasch, 1988
- Glypta limbata Dasch, 1988
- Glypta linearis Dasch, 1988
- Glypta lineata Desvignes, 1856
- Glypta lirata Dasch, 1988
- Glypta longicauda Hartig, 1838
- Glypta longipalpus Dasch, 1988
- Glypta longispinis Gmelin, 1790
- Glypta longiungula Kuslitzky, 2007
- Glypta longiventris Cresson, 1870
- Glypta longula Godoy & Gauld, 2002
- Glypta longula Kuslitzky, 2007
- Glypta macilenta Dasch, 1988
- Glypta macra Cresson, 1870
- Glypta maculata Dasch, 1988
- Glypta magnifica Dasch, 1988
- Glypta mainensis Dasch, 1988
- Glypta manitobae Dasch, 1988
- Glypta marianae Dasch, 1988
- Glypta martini Dasch, 1988
- Glypta maruyamensis Uchida, 1928
- Glypta masoni Dasch, 1988
- Glypta mattagamiana Dasch, 1988
- Glypta mcallisteri Dasch, 1988
- Glypta mckinleyi Dasch, 1988
- Glypta media Momoi, 1963
- Glypta mensurator Fabricius, 1775
- Glypta meritanae Yarger, 1976
- Glypta metadecoris Godoy & Gauld, 2002
- Glypta michiganica Dasch, 1988
- Glypta microcera Thomson, 1889
- Glypta militaris Cresson, 1870
- Glypta mimica Dasch, 1988
- Glypta mimula Dasch, 1988
- Glypta minnesotae Dasch, 1988
- Glypta minuta Dasch, 1988
- Glypta missouriana Dasch, 1988
- Glypta momoii Kuslitzky, 2007
- Glypta monoceros Gravenhorst, 1829
- Glypta montana Dasch, 1988
- Glypta monticolae Kuslitzky, 1978
- Glypta munda Dasch, 1988
- Glypta mutica Cushman, 1919
- Glypta nana Dasch, 1988
- Glypta nebulosa Dasch, 1988
- Glypta nederlandica Dasch, 1988
- Glypta nevadana Dasch, 1988
- Glypta nigra Dasch, 1988
- Glypta nigricornis Thomson, 1889
- Glypta nigrina Desvignes, 1856
- Glypta nigripes Strobl, 1902
- Glypta nigrita Dasch, 1988
- Glypta nigroplica Thomson, 1889
- Glypta nipponica
- Glypta notata Szepligeti, 1898
- Glypta novaconcordica Dasch, 1988
- Glypta novascotiae Dasch, 1988
- Glypta novomexicana Dasch, 1988
- Glypta nuda Dasch, 1988
- Glypta nulla Dasch, 1988
- Glypta nursei Cameron, 1902
- Glypta obscura Dasch, 1988
- Glypta occidentalis Dasch, 1988
- Glypta occulta Dasch, 1988
- Glypta ohioensis Dasch, 1988
- Glypta ontariana Dasch, 1988
- Glypta ophthalmus Kriechbaumer, 1887
- Glypta oregonica Dasch, 1988
- Glypta orientalis Cushman, 1933
- Glypta ornata Kuslitzky, 1978
- Glypta ottawaensis Dasch, 1988
- Glypta palustra Dasch, 1988
- Glypta panamintana Dasch, 1988
- Glypta pansa Dasch, 1988
- Glypta parallela Dasch, 1988
- Glypta partita Dasch, 1988
- Glypta parvicaudata Bridgman, 1889
- Glypta patula Dasch, 1988
- Glypta pecki Dasch, 1988
- Glypta pectinata Dasch, 1988
- Glypta pedata Desvignes, 1856
- Glypta pennsylvanica Dasch, 1988
- Glypta petila Dasch, 1988
- Glypta pettitanae Dasch, 1988
- Glypta phanetae Dasch, 1988
- Glypta phantasmaria Dasch, 1988
- Glypta picea Dasch, 1988
- Glypta picta Kuslitzky, 2007
- Glypta pictipes Taschenberg, 1863
- Glypta pilula Dasch, 1988
- Glypta pisici Kolarov, 1981
- Glypta placida Dasch, 1988
- Glypta plana Dasch, 1988
- Glypta platynotae Dasch, 1988
- Glypta polita Dasch, 1988
- Glypta popofensis Ashmead, 1902
- Glypta prognatha Dasch, 1988
- Glypta prolata Dasch, 1988
- Glypta prolixa Dasch, 1988
- Glypta prominens Dasch, 1988
- Glypta prostata Dasch, 1988
- Glypta protrusa Dasch, 1988
- Glypta pulchra Dasch, 1988
- Glypta pulchripes Cresson, 1870
- Glypta pumila Dasch, 1988
- Glypta punctata Godoy & Gauld, 2002
- Glypta punctifera Dasch, 1988
- Glypta purpuranae Dasch, 1988
- Glypta quebecensis Dasch, 1988
- Glypta ralla Dasch, 1988
- Glypta resinanae Hartig, 1838
- Glypta rhyacioniae Walley & Barron, 1777
- Glypta robsonensis Dasch, 1988
- Glypta robusta Dasch, 1988
- Glypta rohweri Dasch, 1988
- Glypta rotunda Dasch, 1988
- Glypta rubricator Aubert, 1972
- Glypta rubripes Cresson, 1870
- Glypta rufa Uchida, 1928
- Glypta rufata Bridgman, 1887
- Glypta ruficornis Walsh, 1873
- Glypta rufipes Spinola, 1851
- Glypta rufipluralis Walsh, 1873
- Glypta rufiscutellaris Cresson, 1870
- Glypta rufitibialis Dasch, 1988
- Glypta rufiventris Kriechbaumer, 1894
- Glypta rufofasciata Cresson, 1870
- Glypta rufomarginata Cameron, 1886
- Glypta rufonotata Dasch, 1988
- Glypta rufula Dasch, 1988
- Glypta runcinata Dasch, 1988
- Glypta rutilata Dasch, 1988
- Glypta salicis Thomson, 1889
- Glypta salsolicola Schmiedeknecht, 1907
- Glypta santapaulae Dasch, 1988
- Glypta sanvita Godoy & Gauld, 2002
- Glypta saperdae Dasch, 1988
- Glypta saskatchewan Dasch, 1988
- Glypta satanas Dasch, 1988
- Glypta scabrosa Dasch, 1988
- Glypta scalaris Gravenhorst, 1829
- Glypta schneideri Krieger, 1897
- Glypta sculpturata Gravenhorst, 1829
- Glypta scutellaris Thomson, 1889
- Glypta separata Dasch, 1988
- Glypta severa Dasch, 1988
- Glypta shigaensis
- Glypta sierrae Dasch, 1988
- Glypta similis Bridgman, 1886
- Glypta solida Dasch, 1988
- Glypta sonomae Dasch, 1988
- Glypta spectabilis Dasch, 1988
- Glypta spissa Dasch, 1988
- Glypta stenota Dasch, 1988
- Glypta striatifrons Dasch, 1988
- Glypta strigosa Dasch, 1988
- Glypta subcornuta Gravenhorst, 1829
- Glypta subtilis Dasch, 1988
- Glypta succincta Dasch, 1988
- Glypta succineipennis Viereck, 1905
- Glypta sulcata Dasch, 1988
- Glypta suwai
- Glypta synnomae Dasch, 1988
- Glypta taiheizana Sonan, 1936
- Glypta talamanca Godoy & Gauld, 2002
- Glypta talitzkii Kuslitzky, 1974
- Glypta tama Kuslitzky, 1976
- Glypta tamanukii Uchida, 1928
- Glypta tappanensis Dasch, 1988
- Glypta tecta Dasch, 1988
- Glypta tegularis Thomson, 1889
- Glypta tenebrosa Dasch, 1988
- Glypta tenuata Dasch, 1988
- Glypta tenuicornis Thomson, 1889
- Glypta teres Gravenhorst, 1829
- Glypta tetonia Dasch, 1988
- Glypta tibialis Kuslitzky, 1974
- Glypta timberlakei Dasch, 1988
- Glypta tobiasi Kuslitzky, 1974
- Glypta tornata Dasch, 1988
- Glypta tortricis Dasch, 1988
- Glypta touyaensis
- Glypta transversa Dasch, 1988
- Glypta transversalis Scudder, 1890
- Glypta triangularis Momoi, 1963
- Glypta tricincta Provancher, 1890
- Glypta trilineata Dasch, 1988
- Glypta tripartita Dasch, 1988
- Glypta trochanterata Bridgman, 1886
- Glypta truncata Provancher, 1883
- Glypta tuberculator Aubert, 1972
- Glypta tuberculifrons Cresson, 1870
- Glypta tumifrons Godoy & Gauld, 2002
- Glypta tumor Momoi, 1970
- Glypta turgida Dasch, 1988
- Glypta tuta Kuslitzky, 1976
- Glypta ulbrichti Habermehl, 1926
- Glypta undulata Dasch, 1988
- Glypta unita Dasch, 1988
- Glypta utahensis Dasch, 1988
- Glypta varianae Dasch, 1988
- Glypta varicoxa Thomson, 1889
- Glypta variegata Dasch, 1988
- Glypta varipes Cresson, 1865
- Glypta verecunda Dasch, 1988
- Glypta vernalis Dasch, 1988
- Glypta verticalis Dasch, 1988
- Glypta vespertina Dasch, 1988
- Glypta victoriana Dasch, 1988
- Glypta viktorovi Kuslitzky, 1974
- Glypta vinnula Dasch, 1988
- Glypta virginiensis Cresson, 1870
- Glypta vittata Godoy & Gauld, 2002
- Glypta vulgaris Cresson, 1870
- Glypta vulnerator Gravenhorst, 1829
- Glypta wahli Godoy & Gauld, 2002
- Glypta washingtoniana Dasch, 1988
- Glypta werneri Dasch, 1988
- Glypta willsiana Dasch, 1988
- Glypta wisconsinensis Dasch, 1988
- Glypta woerzi Hedwig, 1952
- Glypta xanthogastra Cameron, 1905
- Glypta yasumatsui Uchida, 1952
- Glypta yukonensis Dasch, 1988
- Glypta zenibakoensis
- Glypta zomariae Dasch, 1988
- Glypta zonata Dasch, 1988
- Glypta zozanae Walley & Barron, 1977
- Glypta zurquiensis Godoy & Gauld, 2002
