= Lissonota fundator =

Scientific classification
- Domain: Eukaryota
- Kingdom: Animalia
- Phylum: Arthropoda
- Class: Insecta
- Order: Hymenoptera
- Family: Ichneumonidae
- Genus: Lissonota
- Species: L. fundator

Binomial name
- Lissonota fundator (Thunberg, 1822)

Species of wasp

Lissonota fundator is a species of insect belonging to the family Ichneumonidae.

It is native to Europe.
