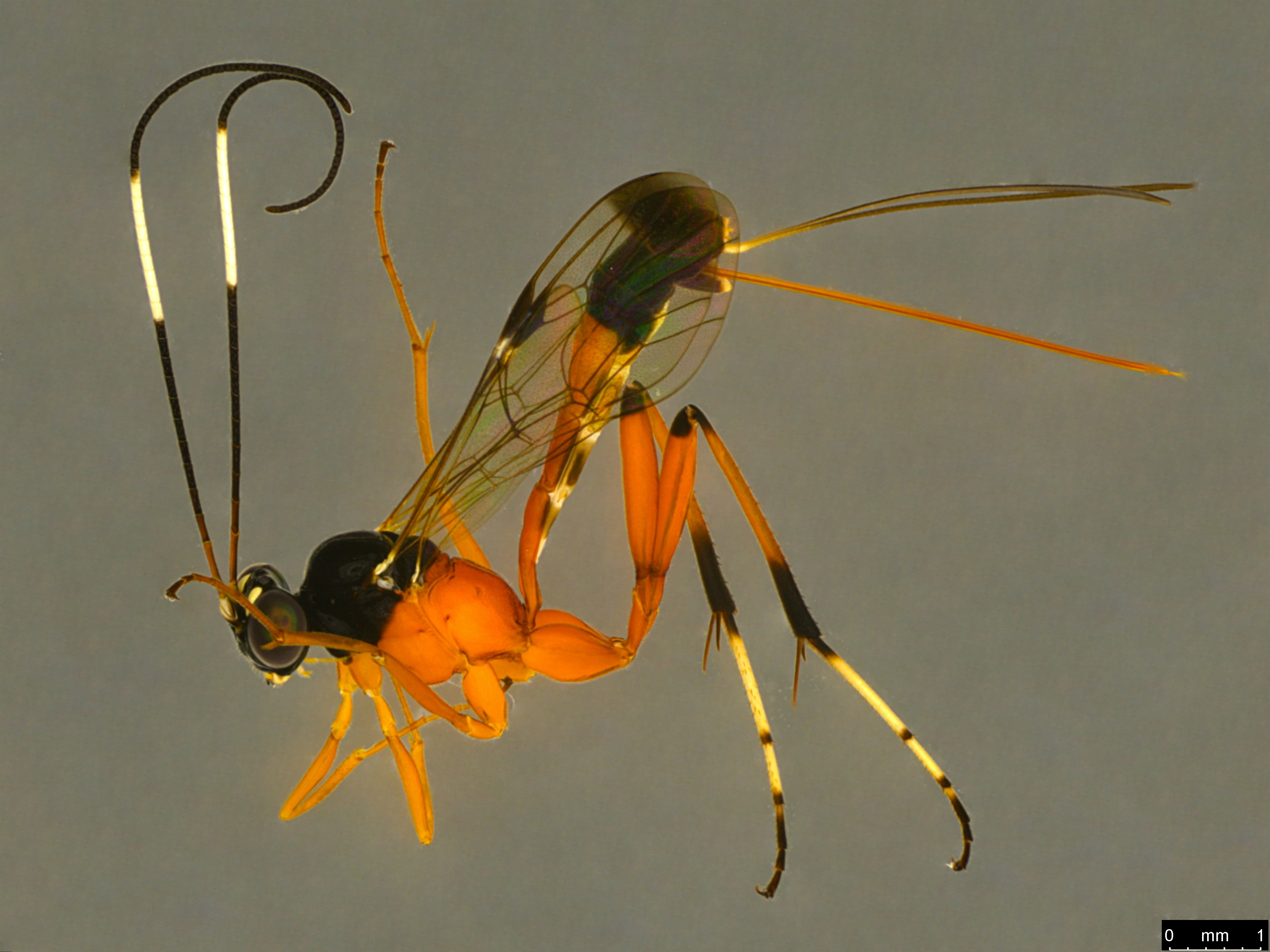
- Leptobatopsis mesominiata adult specimen (female)

Scientific classification
- Domain: Eukaryota
- Kingdom: Animalia
- Phylum: Arthropoda
- Class: Insecta
- Order: Hymenoptera
- Family: Ichneumonidae
- Subfamily: Banchinae
- Tribe: Atrophini
- Genus: Leptobatopsis; Ashmead, 1900

= Leptobatopsis =

Genus of ichneumon

Leptobatopsis is a genus of parasitic ichneumon wasp. Species of Leptobatopsis are diurnal.

== Taxonomy ==
Leptobatopsis contains the following species:

- Leptobatopsis abuelita (Ugalde & Gauld, 2002)
- Leptobatopsis annularis (Kasparyan, 2007)
- Leptobatopsis appendiculata (Momoi, 1960)
- Leptobatopsis ashmeadii (Brues, 1910)
- Leptobatopsis badia (Momoi, 1970)
- Leptobatopsis bicolor (Cushman, 1933)
- Leptobatopsis cardinalis (Chandra & Gupta, 1977)
- Leptobatopsis caudator (Fabricius, 1775)
- Leptobatopsis daedeokensis (Lee & Kang)
- Leptobatopsis flavoannulata (Chandra & Gupta, 1977)
- Leptobatopsis indica (Cameron, 1897)
- Leptobatopsis koreana (Lee & Kang)
- Leptobatopsis lepida (Cameron, 1908)
- Leptobatopsis luridofasciata (Chandra & Gupta, 1977)
- Leptobatopsis luteocorpa (Chandra & Gupta, 1977)
- Leptobatopsis maai (Momoi, 1968)
- Leptobatopsis melanomera (Momoi, 1971)
- Leptobatopsis mesominiata (Chandra, 1976)
- Leptobatopsis moloch (Morley, 1913)
- Leptobatopsis mongolica (Meyer, 1932)
- Leptobatopsis nigra (Cushman, 1933)
- Leptobatopsis nigrescens (Chao, 1975)
- Leptobatopsis nigricapitis (Chandra & Gupta, 1977)
- Leptobatopsis ochromaculata (Chandra & Gupta, 1977)
- Leptobatopsis orientalis (Chandra & Gupta, 1977)
- Leptobatopsis peterseni (Momoi, 1971)
- Leptobatopsis planiscutellata (Enderlein, 1912)
- Leptobatopsis prolata (Chandra & Gupta, 1977)
- Leptobatopsis spilopus (Cameron, 1908)
- Leptobatopsis v-maculata (Cameron, 1907)
