= Apophua =

Scientific classification
- Kingdom: Animalia
- Phylum: Arthropoda
- Class: Insecta
- Order: Hymenoptera
- Family: Ichneumonidae
- Tribe: Glyptini
- Genus: Apophua; Morley, 1913

Genus of wasps

Apophua is a genus of parasitoid wasps belonging to the family Ichneumonidae.

The genus was first described by Claude Morley in 1913.

The genus has cosmopolitan distribution.

Species:

- Apophua bipunctoria
- Apophua cicatricosa
- Apophua evanescens - found in South Korea
- Apophua genalis
