= Teleutaea =

Scientific classification
- Domain: Eukaryota
- Kingdom: Animalia
- Phylum: Arthropoda
- Class: Insecta
- Order: Hymenoptera
- Family: Ichneumonidae
- Genus: Teleutaea; Förster, 1869

Genus of insects

Teleutaea is a genus of parasitoid wasps belonging to the family Ichneumonidae.

The species of this genus are found in Europe and Asia.

Species:

- Teleutaea acarinata Kuslitzky, 1973
- Teleutaea arisana Sonan, 1936
- Teleutaea brischkei (Holmgren, 1860)
- Teleutaea diminuta Momoi, 1978
