= Henry Keith Townes =

American entomologist

Henry Keith Townes, Jr. (20 January 1913 – 2 May 1990) was an American entomologist who specialized in the Hymenoptera with a special focus on the Ichneumonidae.

Townes was born in Greenville, South Carolina and went to study at the Furman College, receiving bachelor's degrees in 1933 which included a BS in biology and BA in language. He then went to Cornell University where he obtained a PhD in 1937 under J.C. Bradley studying Ichneumonidae. He then taught zoology at Syracuse University followed by entomology at Cornell. In 1940 he received a fellowship to work at the Academy of Natural Sciences which resulted in a catalogue of Nearctic Ichneumonidae. He then worked at the USDA in Washington and was appointed a specialist on Ichneumonidae following R. A. Cushman's retirement. In 1949 he moved to become a faculty at the North Carolina State University where he worked till 1956. His wife Marjorie Chapman also assisted him in his Hymenoptera studies and together they sampled widely using Malaise traps, made large collections and established the American Entomological Institute. He then moved to the University of Michigan and by 1970 they had nearly 700,000 specimens. In 1985 he moved the American Entomological Institute to Gainesville, Florida.

Townes published numerous revisions and several major catalogues on the Ichneumonidae. Townes followed strict priority and was opposed to many of the rulings of the ICZN and disregarded many Opinions of the ICZN.
