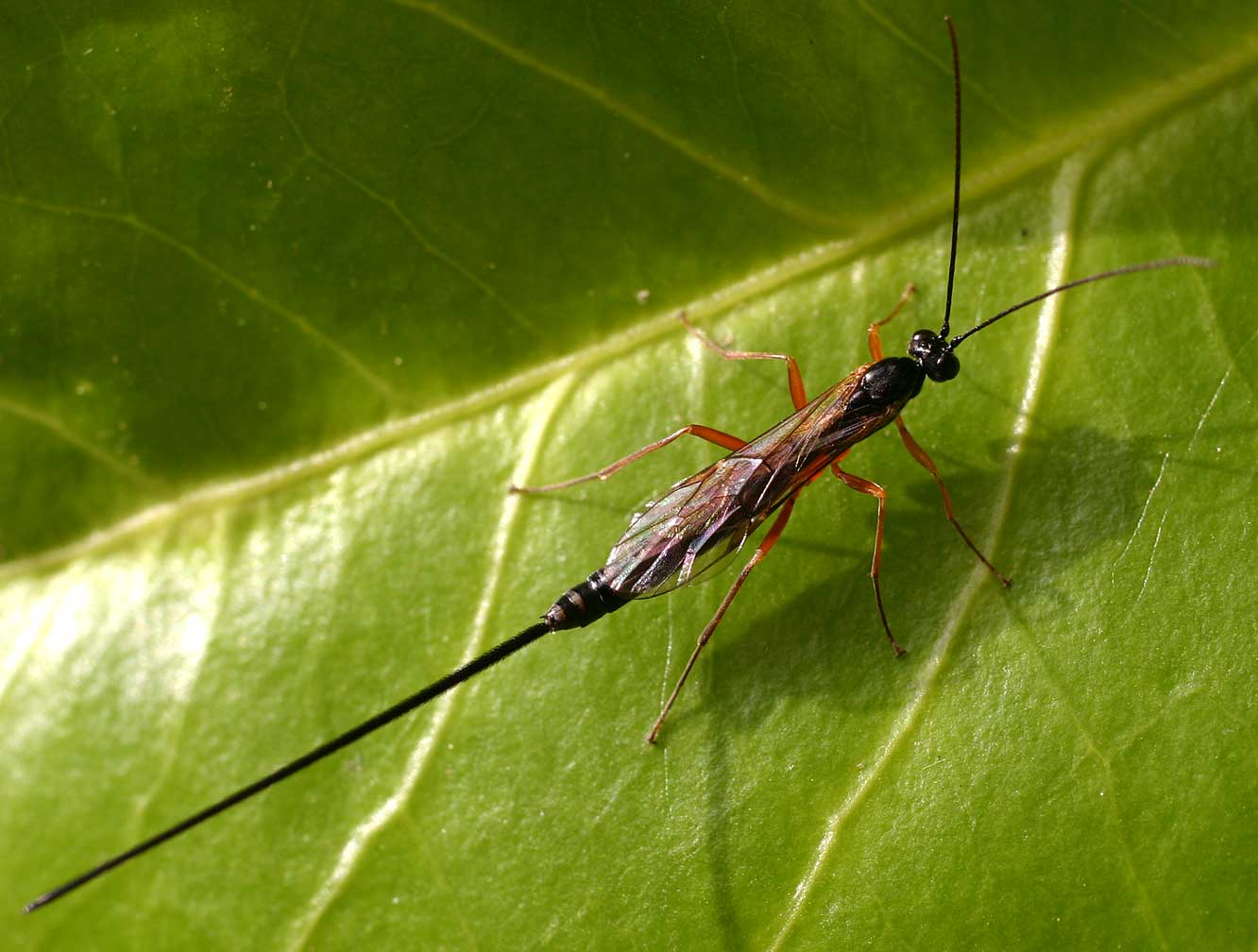

Scientific classification
- Kingdom: Animalia
- Phylum: Arthropoda
- Clade: Pancrustacea
- Class: Insecta
- Order: Hymenoptera
- Family: Ichneumonidae
- Tribe: Atrophini
- Genus: Lissonota; Gravenhorst, 1829

= Lissonota =

Genus of wasps

Lissonota is a genus of ichneumon wasps in the family Ichneumonidae. There are at least 390 described species in Lissonota.

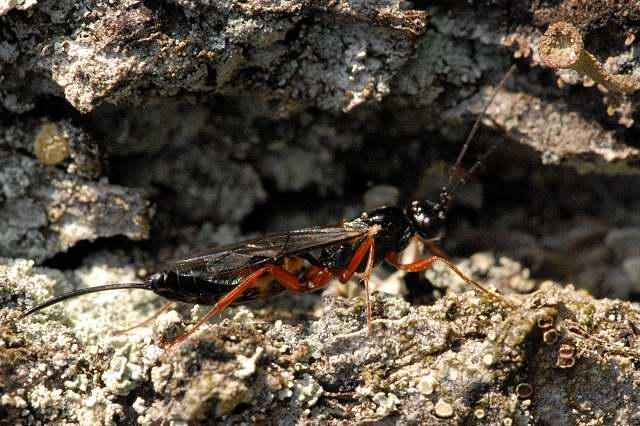

== See also ==
- List of Lissonota species
