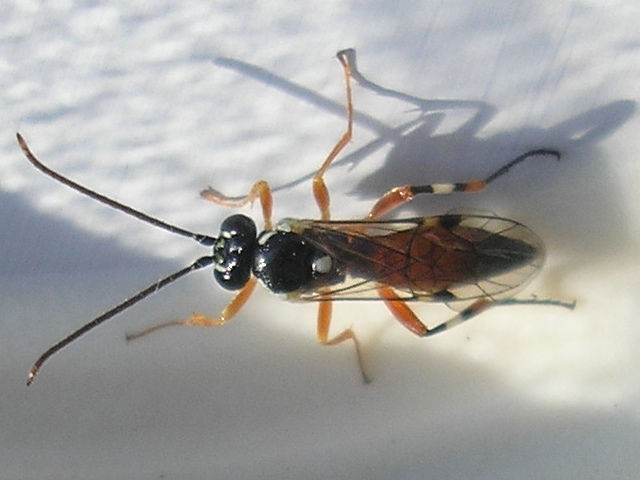
- Diplazon cf laetatorius

Scientific classification
- Kingdom: Animalia
- Phylum: Arthropoda
- Clade: Pancrustacea
- Class: Insecta
- Order: Hymenoptera
- Family: Ichneumonidae
- Subfamily: Diplazontinae; Viereck, 1918

Genera
- Bioblapsis; Campocraspedon; Daschia; Enizemum; Episemura; Homotropus; Phthorima; Promethes; Sussaba; Diplazon; Syrphoctonus; Syrphophilus; Tymmophorus; Woldstedtius; Xestopelta many others

= Diplazontinae =

Subfamily of insects

Diplazontinae is a subfamily of Ichneumonidae.

They are koinobiont endoparasitoids of Syrphidae. Oviposition is into the egg or larva and emergence is from the puparium. Although they are distributed worldwide most species are in the Holarctic region where there are 19 genera.

Diplazontines have 3-toothed mandibles and the first abdominal tergite is box-like.

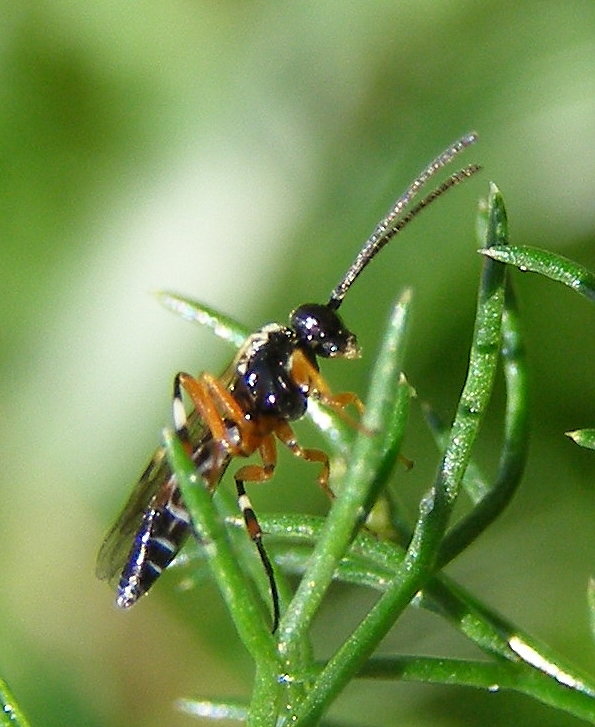
Diplazon laetatorius
