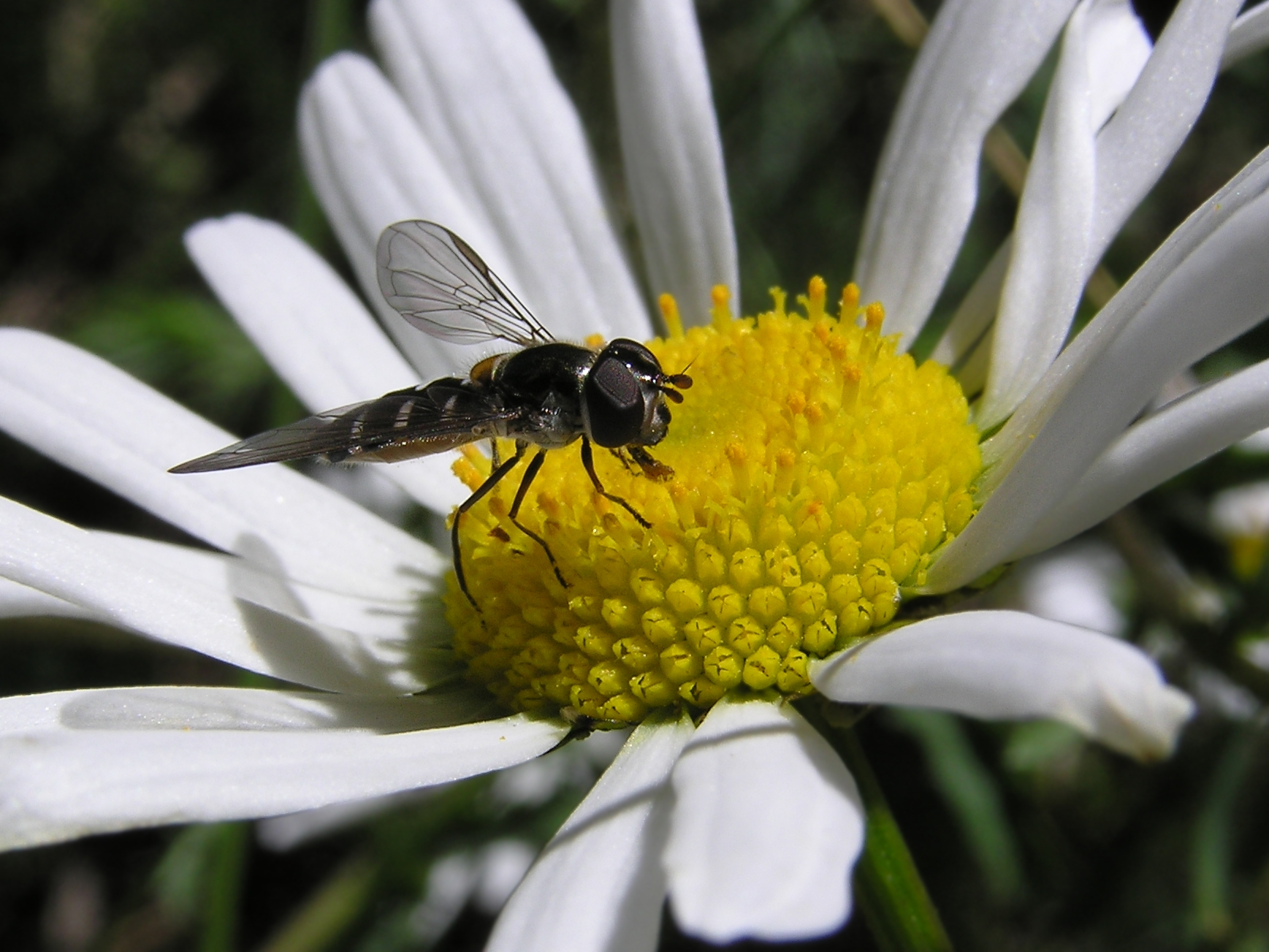
- M. novaezelandiae individual visiting an ox-eye daisy

Scientific classification
- Kingdom: Animalia
- Phylum: Arthropoda
- Class: Insecta
- Order: Diptera
- Family: Syrphidae
- Genus: Melangyna
- Species: M. novaezelandiae

Binomial name
- Melangyna novaezelandiae (Macquart, 1855)

Synonyms
- Synonymy: Syrphus novaeselaniae Macquart, 1855; Syrphus novaezealandiae Hutton, 1881; Syrphus novaezelandiae Macquart, 1855; Syrphus ortas Walker, 1849; Syrphus rectus Nowicki, 1875

= Melangyna novaezelandiae =

Species of hoverfly

Melangyna novaezelandiae, commonly referred to as the large hoverfly, is a hoverfly species found in New Zealand. They are widespread throughout the country and abundant during summer months. They occur in a variety of habitats, including in subalpine and agricultural zones. As adults, they are around 9–12 millimetres in length, with a blackish body that has yellowish markings on the abdomen. The larvae vaguely resemble green slugs. The adults live for around 19–45 days and lay their eggs near aphid colonies. As adults, they feed on pollen and nectar from a wide range of flower species. Their pollen diet is considered to be essential for the females to produce eggs. Because of this, females tend to feed on pollen more than males. The larvae are predators and feed on aphids, but will also target Lepidoptera larvae such as Pieris rapae. Because of this diet, the larvae have been considered for use as a biocontrol agent. The species was first described in 1849 by English entomologist Francis Walker. A later description, however, is the main basis for this species. They are parasitised by Diplazon laetatorius, an Ichneumonidae wasp introduced to New Zealand.

== Taxonomy ==
Melangyna novaezelandiae is based on the description of Syrphus novaezelandiae in 1855 by French entomologist Pierre-Justin-Marie Macquart. The species, however, was first described as Syrphus ortas in 1849 by Francis Walker. Although in principle this should be the correct specific name for the species, it has been discarded due to the former spelling being widely used. In 1875, it was described yet again as Syrphus rectus by Polish zoologist Maksymilian Nowicki. In 1969, it was transferred to the genus Melangyna, and placed in the newly erected subgenus Austrosyrphus. In some literature, it has been incorrectly misspelled as Melangyna novaezealandiae due to an error in an 1881 publication. In 2008, dipterologist Christian Thompson recognized M. novaezelandiae, S. ortas, and S. rectus as being the same species. This species is commonly called the "large hoverfly" and has been referred to as the "New Zealand black hoverfly". One study has suggested that M. novaezelandiae likely evolved after dispersing over from Australia.

== Description ==
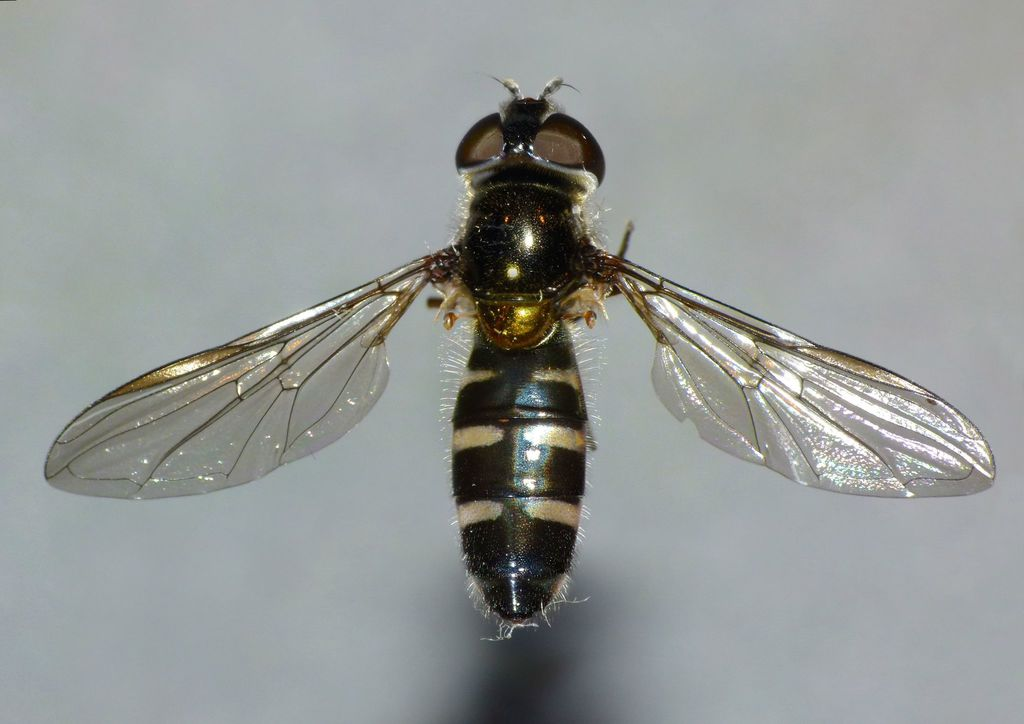
Adult female

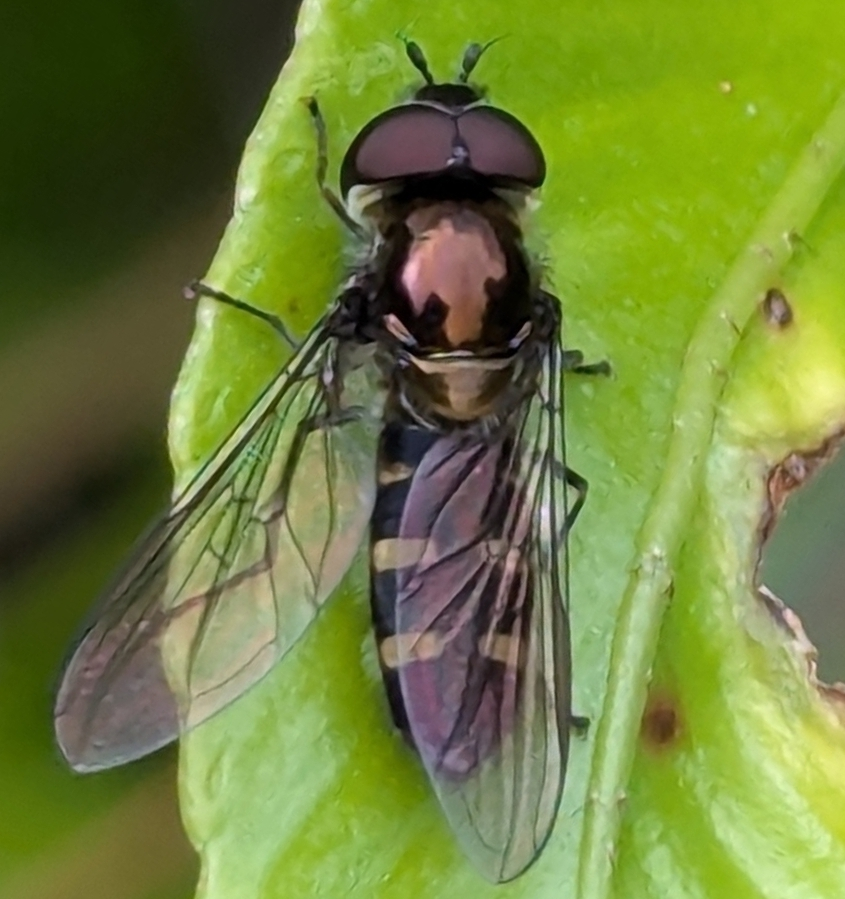
Adult male

These flies are 9–12 millimetres (mm) in length. At the top of the head are two large compound eyes and three ocelli, which are simple light detectors. Males and females are mostly identical. For males, however, the upper surface of the eyes touch, whereas they do not in females. The legs are slender and covered in black hairs. The thorax is oval, coloured black, and covered in fine hairs. The male abdomen is coloured black with three pairs of creamy yellow bands on the upper surface. In the female there are four pairs, the last of which is very reduced. In contrast, the underside of the abdomen is reddish brown. The abdomen is covered in small fine hairs, although they are not easily seen. As the flies age, their wings become increasingly worn out from flight and foraging activities.

=== Eggs and larvae ===
The eggs have hexagonal patterning on their surface. In the first instar, they are 0.9–1 mm in length. During this stage, they are pale yellow because their transparent skin makes their internal organs visible. There are no signs of segmentation, and there are spines in nine rows going from the head to the rear of the body. Each row has twelve spines. For the second instar, they are 3–3.5 mm in length. In this stage, segmentation is noticeable in the head region. The spines from the first stage are gone and are replaced with black bristles. Bands of fatty tissue in the body are visible. During the third instar, they are 9–11 mm in length. They have an almost cylindrical shape and are mostly light brown but darker at the end of the body and in scattered patches. The colour becomes light green towards the head region. The mouthparts have stout hooks. Segmentation is distinct, and the skin has a corrugated texture. The larvae resemble small green slugs.

=== Pupae ===
The pupae are 6.5–7 mm in length. They are coloured dark brown but are lighter on the upper surface and brown-black at the sides. There are black spots on the upper surface. The skin is still corrugated like in the larvae.

== Distribution and habitat ==
M. novaezelandiae are widespread throughout New Zealand and can even be found on offshore islands such as the Chatham Islands. There are also records of them inhabiting the subantarctic Auckland Islands, Snares Islands, and Campbell Islands. They occur in a wide range of habitats including subalpine zones, tussock, and agricultural habitats. In agricultural habitats, they are one of the two most common species of hoverfly present, the other species being Melanostoma fasciatum.

== Life history ==
Adults are abundant from September to May (the warmer months in the Southern Hemisphere) but may be found year-round. After being laid, the eggs take roughly three days to hatch. Like many other hoverflies, M. novaezelandiae has three larval instars. The first instar usually takes 3–4 days but can take up to 14 days. At the end of this stage, fatty tissue begins to accumulate. The second instar takes roughly 3–10 days, and the third instar takes 4–20 days. Upon completion of the third instar, the larvae begin pupation, which lasts 8–15 days depending on the time of year. When pupating, they lie among the remains of their prey at the base of plant stems. Once pupation is completed, the adults break out of the pupae skin at the head end. This process normally occurs during the morning. Adults can live between 19–45 days. Egg production occurs throughout most of the year but peaks in summer months. The eggs are laid near aphid colonies, which the larvae feed on once they hatch. In laboratory conditions, around 80% of eggs are fertile.

== Diet ==
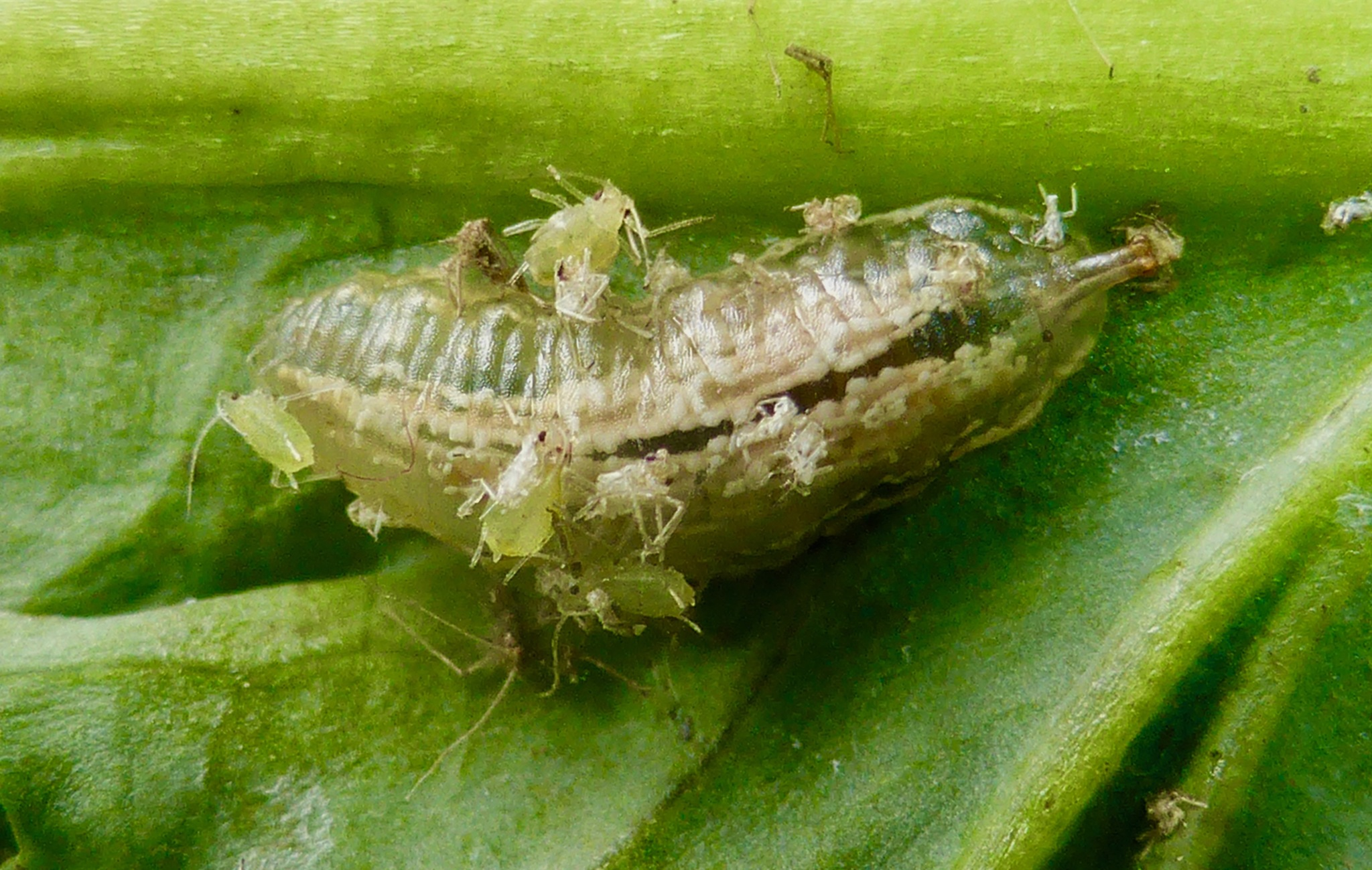
Larva feeding on aphids

As larvae, they are predators that often feed on aphids, but they have also been observed feeding on other arthropods such as moth larvae. In one study, M. novaezelandiae and Melanostoma fasciatum accounted for 32.6% of Pieris rapae caterpillar mortality. New Zealand has very few native aphids, and most of the aphid fauna are introduced species. Because of this, it is presumed they had to rely on other prey groups for food. Before the introduction of additional aphid species, M. novaezelandiae may have been far less common. To catch aphid prey, the larvae lie in the middle of a group of aphids and wait for an aphid to walk within reach. Upon feeling an aphid, the larvae then strike it with their pointed head, the apex of which is covered in sticky mucus. The larvae then retract their head with the prey and consume the juicy parts of it, leaving the dry skin uneaten and thrown aside. Because of this diet, the larvae have been considered for use as biocontrol agents to manage aphids and other pests that damage crops. In laboratory settings, the larvae have been observed performing cannibalism, usually by older larvae preying upon younger ones.

=== Floral feeding ===
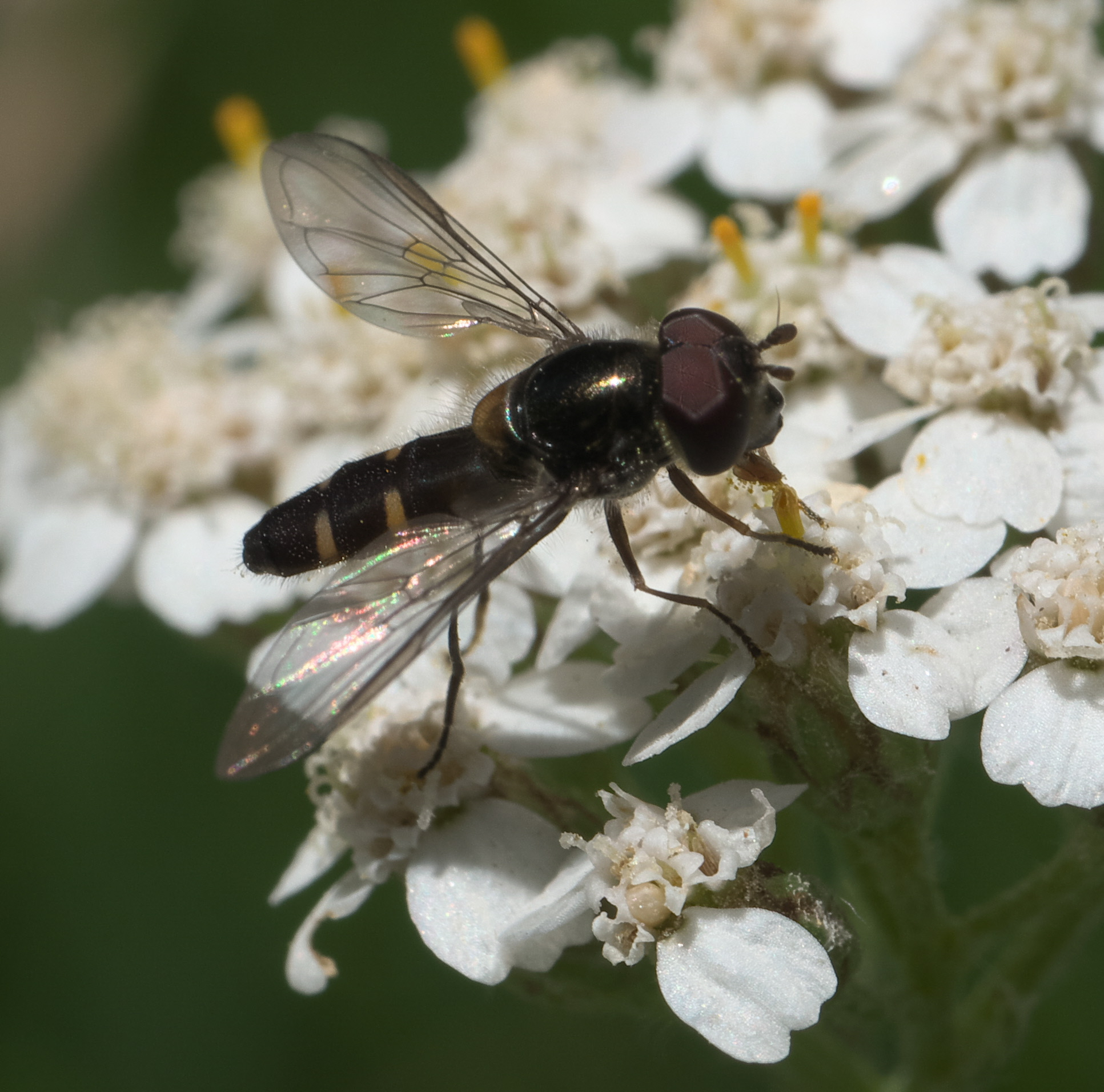
M. novaezelandiae visiting a flower

As adults, they are herbivores that feed on pollen and nectar, which may make them useful pollinators. They are known to be frequent flower visitors in both agricultural and natural settings, including subalpine zones. In one study of pollination in subalpine zones, it was found that M. novaezelandiae visited more species of flower than any other pollinator observed.

In agricultural areas, it was found that M. novaezelandiae was the second most common visitor of crop flowers, so they may have a role in pollination. In one study of bok choy crop pollinators, M. novaezelandiae transferred roughly 13 pollen grains between flowers per hour, indicating that it is ineffective as a pollinator of this crop. For contrast, the bumblebee Bombus terrestris transferred around 2,247 grains per hour. Like many syrphids, they are very generalized and will visit many species of flower. In one investigation, Taraxacum was reported to be their principal food source. Some of the other flowers that they are known to visit include Trifolium pratense, Raoulia grandiflora, Leptospermum scoparium, Celmisia spectabilis, and Melicytus species, but many more are known. One research paper found that they are most attracted to yellow colours, which may be an important cue in finding floral resources.

A previous study that linked gut fullness with egg production found that pollen is essential for the development of eggs. Because of this, females tend to feed on pollen more frequently than males. Studies of the gut contents of M. novaezelandiae found that pollen grain sizes varied from 19 to 47 micrometres.

== Parasites ==
Diplazon laetatorius, an Ichneumonidae wasp introduced to New Zealand, lay their eggs in the larvae of M. novaezelandiae and other hoverflies. The wasps develop in the larvae, maturing into adults and bursting out when the larvae pupate. In one study, five larvae out of 60 were parasitised by D. laetatorius.
