= Syrphoctonus =

Scientific classification
- Kingdom: Animalia
- Phylum: Arthropoda
- Clade: Pancrustacea
- Class: Insecta
- Order: Hymenoptera
- Family: Ichneumonidae
- Subfamily: Diplazontinae
- Genus: Syrphoctonus; Förster, 1869

Genus of wasps

Syrphoctonus tarsatorius

Syrphoctonus is a genus of ichneumonid wasps with many species around the world, of which more than 30 occur in Europe.

Members of this genus are parasitoids on hoverflies.

== Name ==
The genus name is derived from Ancient Greek Syrpho- "gnat" and -ctonus "killer", referring to the host of the genus.
