= Homotropus =

Scientific classification
- Kingdom: Animalia
- Phylum: Arthropoda
- Class: Insecta
- Order: Hymenoptera
- Family: Ichneumonidae
- Subfamily: Diplazontinae
- Genus: Homotropus; Förster, 1869

Species
- Several, including: Homotropus collinus (Stelfox, 1941); Homotropus crassicornis (Thomson, 1890); Homotropus crassicrus (Thomson, 1890); Homotropus dimidiatus (Schrank, 1802); Homotropus elegans (Gravenhorst, 1829); Homotropus fissorius (Gravenhorst, 1829); Homotropus gracilentus (Holmgren, 1856); Homotropus impolitus (Stelfox, 1941); Homotropus incisus (Thomson, 1890); Homotropus longiventris (Thomson, 1890); Homotropus megaspis (Thomson, 1890); Homotropus neopulcher Horstmann, 1968; Homotropus nigritarsus (Gravenhorst, 1829); Homotropus pallipes (Gravenhorst, 1829); Homotropus pictus (Gravenhorst, 1829); Homotropus reflexus (Morley, 1906); Homotropus signatus (Gravenhorst, 1829); Homotropus simulans (Stelfox, 1941); Homotropus strigator (Fabricius, 1793); Homotropus subopacus (Stelfox, 1941); Homotropus sundevalli (Holmgren, 1856); Homotropus tarsatorius (Panzer, 1809); Homotropus tricolor (Stelfox, 1941); Hoplismenus albifrons Gravenhorst, 1829; Hoplismenus bidentatus (Gmelin in Linnaeus, 1790)

Genus of wasps

Homotropus is a genus of wasps in the family Ichneumonidae.
