= Homotropus elegans =

Scientific classification
- Kingdom: Animalia
- Phylum: Arthropoda
- Class: Insecta
- Order: Hymenoptera
- Family: Ichneumonidae
- Genus: Homotropus
- Species: H. elegans

Binomial name
- Homotropus elegans (Gravenhorst, 1829)

Synonyms
- Bassus elegans Gravenhorst, 1829

Species of wasp

Homotropus elegans is a species of wasp in the family Ichneumonidae. It is found from Europe to Iran.
