= Campocraspedon =

Scientific classification
- Kingdom: Animalia
- Phylum: Arthropoda
- Clade: Pancrustacea
- Class: Insecta
- Order: Hymenoptera
- Family: Ichneumonidae
- Subfamily: Diplazontinae
- Genus: Campocraspedon; Uchida, 1957

Genus of wasp

Campocraspedon is a genus of ichneumonid wasp in the insect order Hymenoptera. It comprises six species. Members of this genus are parasitoids of Syrphid larva.

The species included in this genus are:

- Campocraspedon annulitarsis
- Campocraspedon caudatus (Thomson, 1890)
- Campocraspedon elongatus
- Campocraspedon foutsi
- Campocraspedon satoi Uchida, 1957
- Campocraspedon truncatus

== Description ==
Females have an all black face, head, mesosoma, mesotoma, scutellum, coxae, with black antenna, typically with 17, rarely 18 flagellomeres and a paler base. Additionally they have a dark apex and tarsomeres; yellow hind corner of pronotum, tegula, mesepimeron with yellow on the clypeus; orange femora, hind tibia and, mouthparts that are more orange than the males.

Males are similar, however have antenna with 17-18 flagellomeres; a stripe of yellow on their lower mesopleuron, yellow markings on the hind margins of their tergites; ventrally yellow colouring on their antenna, subtegular ridge, and most of their mesosternum; and yellow fore to mid coxae. Face is yellow with a black median stripe below antennal sockets.

Both have fore wing lengths of 4.5-5.5 millimetres.
