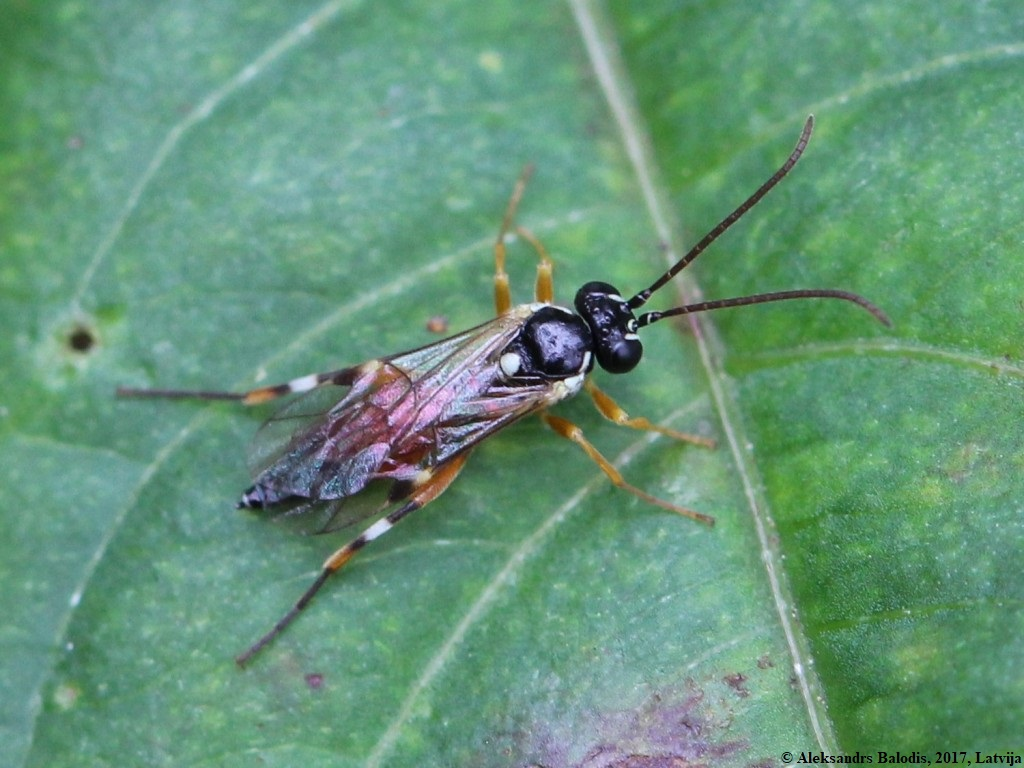
- Diplazon laetatorius

Scientific classification
- Domain: Eukaryota
- Kingdom: Animalia
- Phylum: Arthropoda
- Class: Insecta
- Order: Hymenoptera
- Family: Ichneumonidae
- Genus: Diplazon; Nees von Esenbeck, 1818

= Diplazon =

Genus of wasps

Diplazon is a genus of parasitoid wasps belonging to the family Ichneumonidae.

The genus has cosmopolitan distribution.

== Species ==
The following species are recognised in the genus Diplazon:

- Diplazon albotibialis Dasch, 1964
- Diplazon angustus Dasch, 1964
- Diplazon anolcus Dasch, 1964
- Diplazon areolatus Ma, Wang & Wang, 1995
- Diplazon aubertiator Diller, 1986
- Diplazon bachmaieri Diller, 1986
- Diplazon bradleyi Dasch, 1964
- Diplazon cascadensis Dasch, 1964
- Diplazon clypearis (Brischke, 1892)
- Diplazon coccinatus (Tosquinet, 1896)
- Diplazon constrictus Dasch, 1964
- Diplazon contiguus (Schiodte, 1839)
- Diplazon deletus (Thomson, 1890)
- Diplazon erugatus Dasch, 1964
- Diplazon fechteri Diller, 1986
- Diplazon festatorius (Costa, 1888)
- Diplazon flavifrons Dasch, 1964
- Diplazon flixi Klopfstein, 2014
- Diplazon galenensis Dasch, 1964
- Diplazon guptai Diller, 1977
- Diplazon heinrichi Diller, 1982
- Diplazon hispanicus (Spinola, 1843)
- Diplazon hyperboreus (Marshall, 1877)
- Diplazon implanus Dasch, 1964
- Diplazon insulcatus Dasch, 1964
- Diplazon kurilensis Klopfstein, 2014
- Diplazon laetatorius (Fabricius, 1781)
- Diplazon luzonensis Baltazar, 1955
- Diplazon marakwetensis (Seyrig, 1935)
- Diplazon mulleolus Dasch, 1964
- Diplazon neoalpinus Zwakhals, 1979
- Diplazon nordicus Klopfstein, 2014
- Diplazon novoguineensis Momoi & Nakanishi, 1968
- Diplazon oralis (Nees, 1830)
- Diplazon orbitalis (Cresson, 1865)
- Diplazon orientalis (Cameron, 1905)
- Diplazon pallicoxa Manukyan, 1987
- Diplazon parvus Klopfstein, 2014
- Diplazon pectoratorius (Thunberg, 1822)
- Diplazon prolatus Dasch, 1964
- Diplazon pullatus Dasch, 1964
- Diplazon punctatus Ma, Wang & Wang, 1995
- Diplazon quadricinctus (Schrank, 1785)
- Diplazon quadrincisus (Spinola, 1851)
- Diplazon ruwenzoriensis (Seyrig, 1935)
- Diplazon ryukyuensis Nakanishi, 1967
- Diplazon schachti Diller, 1986
- Diplazon scrobiculatus Ma, Wang & Wang, 1995
- Diplazon scutatorius Teunissen, 1943
- Diplazon scutellaris (Cresson, 1868)
- Diplazon suigensis Uchida, 1957
- Diplazon tetragonus (Thunberg, 1822)
- Diplazon tibiatorius (Thunberg, 1822)
- Diplazon triangulus Dasch, 1964
- Diplazon urundiensis (Benoit, 1955)
- Diplazon varicoxa (Thomson, 1890)
- Diplazon visayensis Baltazar, 1955
- Diplazon walleyi Dasch, 1964
- Diplazon zetteli Klopfstein, 2014
- BOLD:AAD1879 (Diplazon sp.)
- BOLD:ACZ1884 (Diplazon sp.)
- BOLD:ADL6404 (Diplazon sp.)
