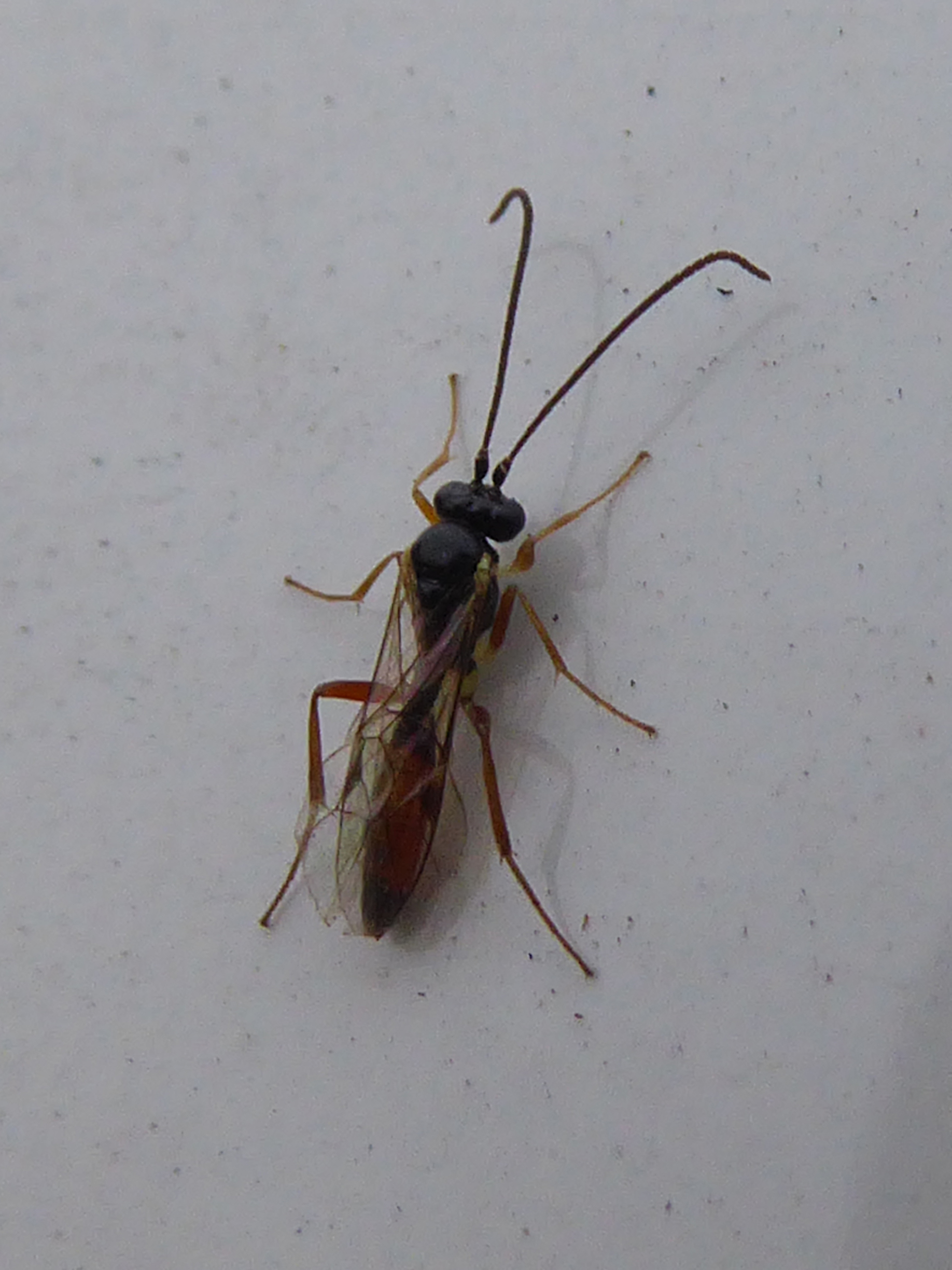
- Sussaba sp., Italy

Scientific classification
- Domain: Eukaryota
- Kingdom: Animalia
- Phylum: Arthropoda
- Class: Insecta
- Order: Hymenoptera
- Family: Ichneumonidae
- Genus: Sussaba; Cameron, 1909

= Sussaba =

Genus of wasps

Sussaba is a genus of parasitoid wasps belonging to the family Ichneumonidae.

The species of this genus are found in Europe and America.

Species:

- Sussaba atra Manukyan, 1988
- Sussaba balteata Dasch, 1964
