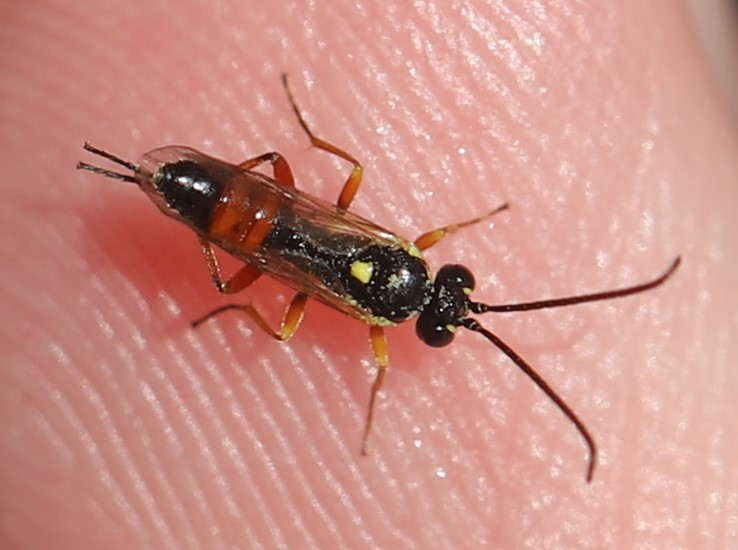

Scientific classification
- Kingdom: Animalia
- Phylum: Arthropoda
- Class: Insecta
- Order: Hymenoptera
- Family: Ichneumonidae
- Genus: Syrphophilus; Dasch, 1964

= Syrphophilus =

Genus of wasps

Syrphophilus is a genus of parasitoid wasps belonging to the family Ichneumonidae.

The species of this genus are found in Europe, Easternmost Asia and North America.

Species:

- Syrphophilus asperatus Dasch, 1964
- Syrphophilus bizonarius (Gravenhorst, 1829)
