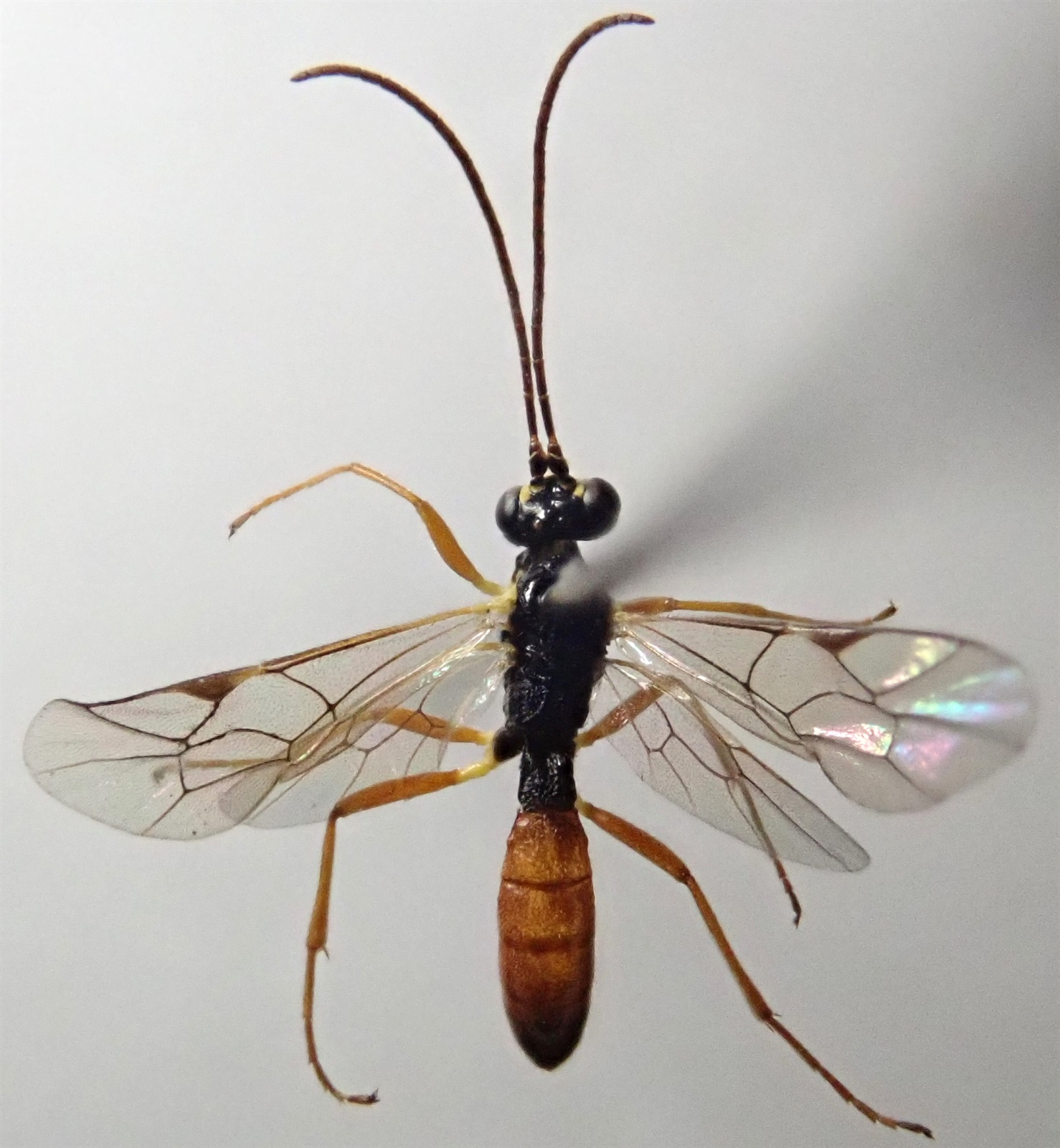
- Tymmophorus erythrozonus

Scientific classification
- Domain: Eukaryota
- Kingdom: Animalia
- Phylum: Arthropoda
- Class: Insecta
- Order: Hymenoptera
- Family: Ichneumonidae
- Genus: Tymmophorus; Schmiedeknecht, 1913

= Tymmophorus =

Genus of wasps

Tymmophorus is a genus of parasitoid wasps belonging to the family Ichneumonidae.

The species of this genus are found in Europe and North America.

Species:

- Tymmophorus erythrozonus (Forster, 1850)
- Tymmophorus fasciventris Dasch, 1964
