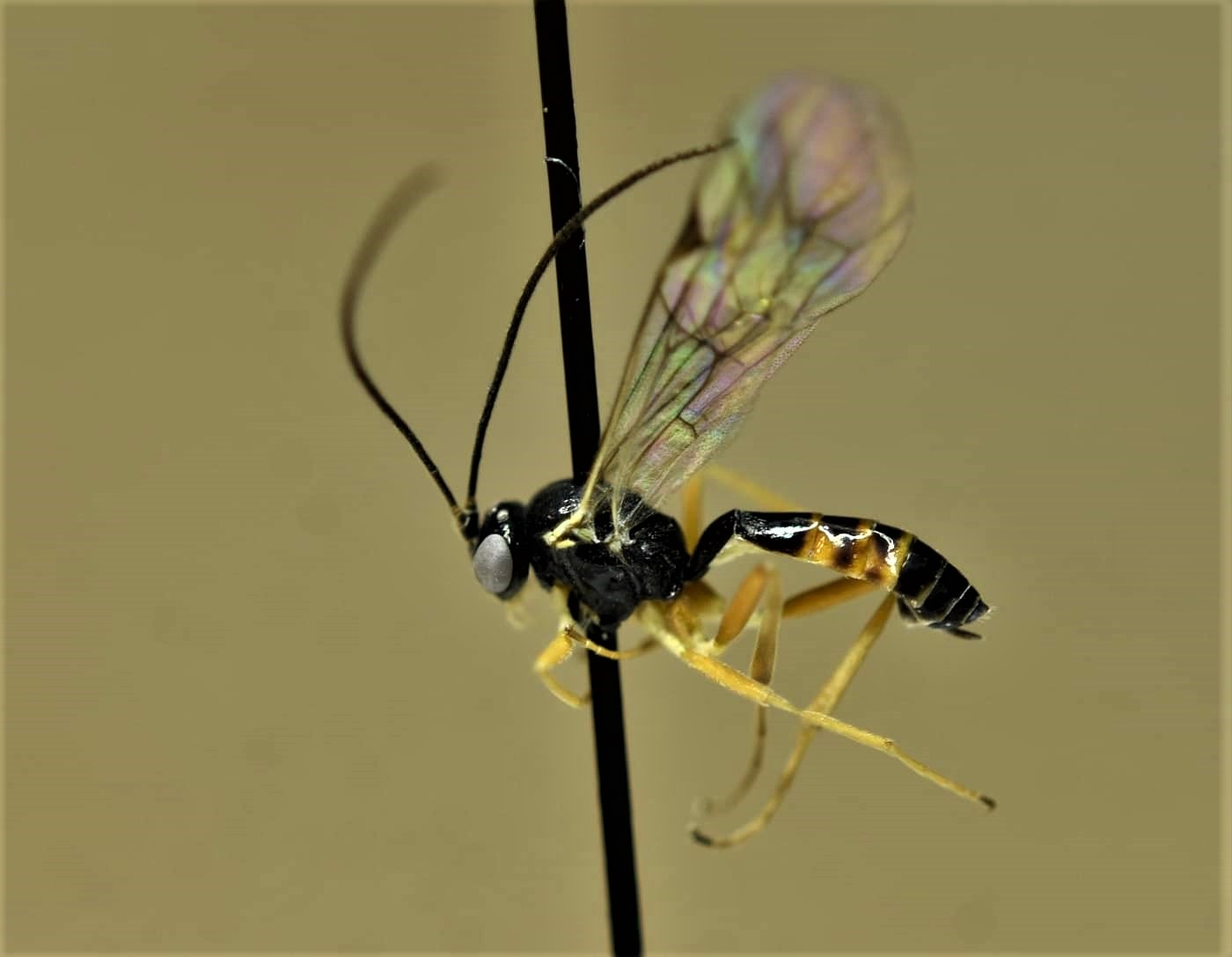
- Promethes sulcator

Scientific classification
- Domain: Eukaryota
- Kingdom: Animalia
- Phylum: Arthropoda
- Class: Insecta
- Order: Hymenoptera
- Family: Ichneumonidae
- Genus: Promethes; Förster, 1869

= Promethes =

Genus of wasps

Promethes is a genus of parasitoid wasps belonging to the family Ichneumonidae, containing over 15 described species.

The species of this genus are found in Europe and North America.

== Selected species ==
- Promethes albipes Szepligeti, 1898
- Promethes albiventralis Diller, 1984
- Promethes sulcator (Gravenhorst, 1829)
