= Enizemum =

Scientific classification
- Domain: Eukaryota
- Kingdom: Animalia
- Phylum: Arthropoda
- Class: Insecta
- Order: Hymenoptera
- Family: Ichneumonidae
- Genus: Enizemum; Förster, 1869

Genus of wasps

Enizemum is a genus of parasitoid wasps belonging to the family Ichneumonidae.

The species of this genus are found in Europe and North America.

Species:

- Enizemum albiscutellum Ma, Wang & Wang, 1992
- Enizemum carmenae Gauld & Hanson, 1997
- Enizemum giganteum Uchida, 1957
- Enizemum ornatum (Gravenhorst, 1829)
- Enizemum nigrocoxatum Balueva & Lee, 2016
