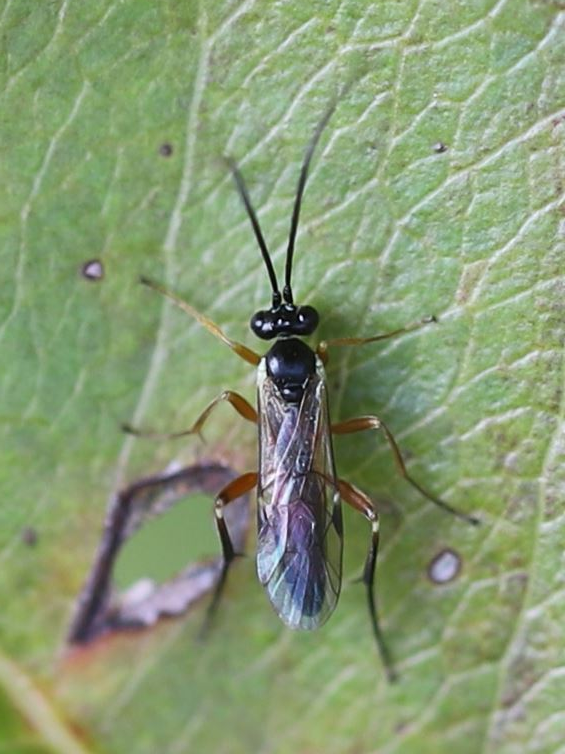

Scientific classification
- Kingdom: Animalia
- Phylum: Arthropoda
- Clade: Pancrustacea
- Class: Insecta
- Order: Hymenoptera
- Family: Ichneumonidae
- Genus: Woldstedtius; Carlson, 1979

= Woldstedtius =

Genus of wasps

Woldstedtius is a genus of parasitoid wasps belonging to the family Ichneumonidae. Members of this genus are known to feed on Syrphid prey.

The species of this genus are found in Europe, Australia and America.

There are 39 recognised species, including:

- Woldstedtius abditus (Diller, 1980)
- Woldstedtius ambreui (Diller, 1982)
- Woldstedtius bauri (Klopfstein, 2014)
