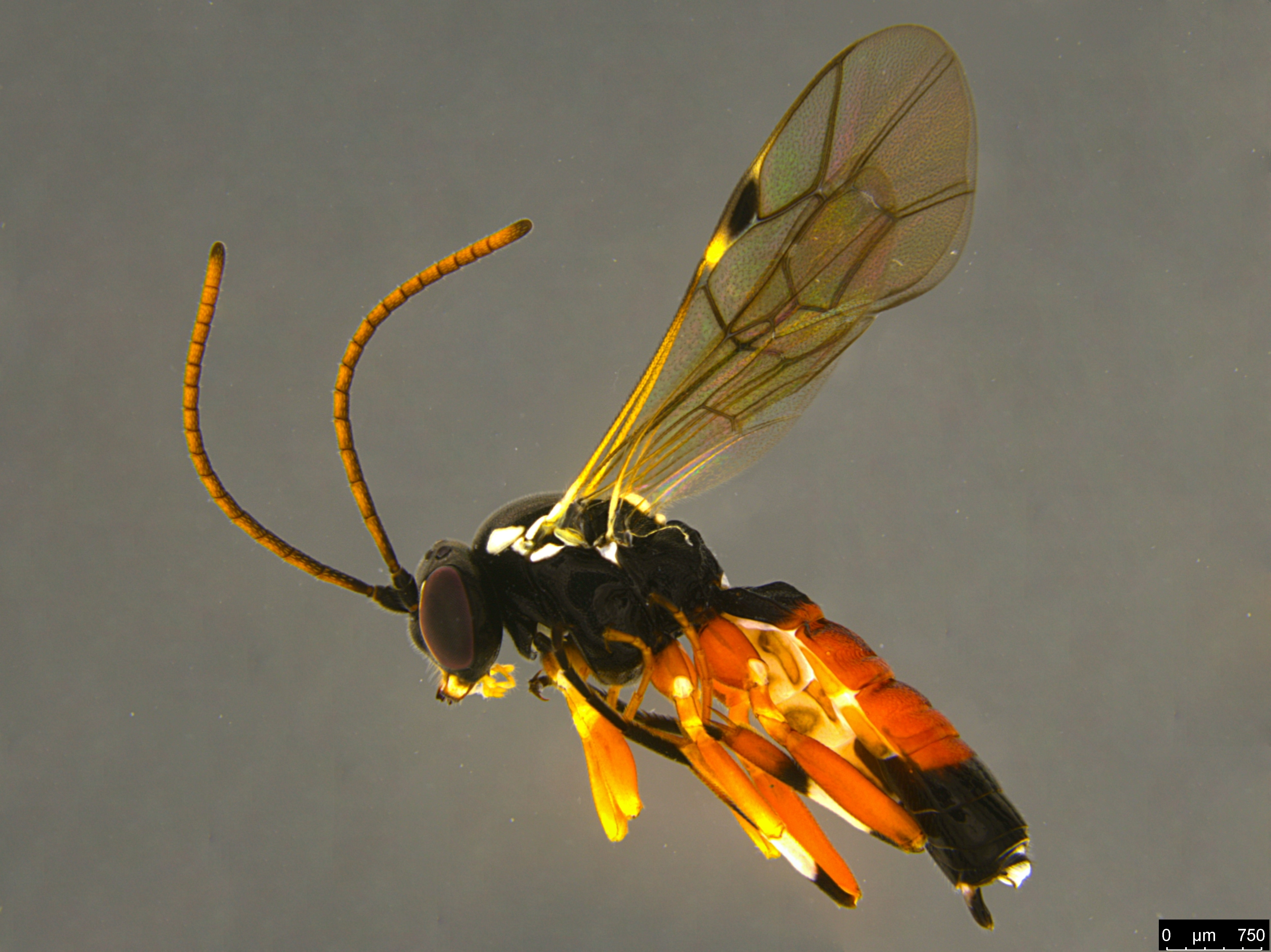

Scientific classification
- Kingdom: Animalia
- Phylum: Arthropoda
- Class: Insecta
- Order: Hymenoptera
- Family: Ichneumonidae
- Genus: Diplazon
- Species: D. laetatorius

Binomial name
- Diplazon laetatorius (Fabricius, 1781)

Synonyms
- Ichneumon laetatorius Fabricius, 1781; Bassus laetatorius Anomalon attractus Bassus albovarius Bassus cinctipes Bassus tripicticrus Bassus venustulus Bassus balearicus Bassus laetatorius terminalis Bassus laetatorius senegalensis Bassus laetatorius ikiti Bassus generosus

= Diplazon laetatorius =

Species of parasitoid wasp

Diplazon laetatorius is a hover fly parasitoid wasp in the Diplazontinae subfamily of the Ichneumonid wasp family (Ichneumonidae). It was first described as Ichneumon laetatorius in 1781 by Johan Christian Fabricius.

== Ecology ==
Adult Diplazon laetatorius feed on floral nectar, with a preference for flowers in the umbellifer family. Females lay their eggs on or near the eggs and larvae of hoverflies (Syrphidae). The developing parasitoid larvae consume the host from within, eventually completing development and emerging as adult wasps.
