= List of Pimpla species =

These 201 species belong to Pimpla, a genus of ichneumon wasps in the family Ichneumonidae.

== Pimpla species ==
- Pimpla acutula (Momoi, 1973)^{c}
- Pimpla aeola (Porter, 1970)^{c g}
- Pimpla aequalis Provancher, 1880^{c b}
- Pimpla aethiops Curtis, 1828^{c g}
- Pimpla albipalpis Cameron, 1905^{c g}
- Pimpla alboannulata Uchida, 1928^{c g}
- Pimpla albociliata Kasparyan, 1974^{c g}
- Pimpla albomarginata Cameron, 1886^{c g}
- Pimpla alishanensis (Kusigemati, 1985)^{c g}
- Pimpla alnorum (Porter, 1970)^{c g}
- Pimpla amamiensis (Momoi, 1970)^{c g}
- Pimpla amplifemura Lin, 1988^{c g}
- Pimpla annulipes Brullé, 1846^{c g b}
- Pimpla anomalensis Theobald, 1937^{c g}
- Pimpla apollyon Morley, 1913^{c g}
- Pimpla appendigera Brues, 1906^{c g}
- Pimpla apricaria Costa, 1885^{c g}
- Pimpla aquensis Theobald, 1937^{c g}
- Pimpla aquilonia Cresson, 1870^{c g b}
- Pimpla arayai Gauld, 1991^{c g}
- Pimpla arcadica Kasparyan, 1973^{c g}
- Pimpla arctica Zetterstedt, 1838^{c g}
- Pimpla arisana (Sonan, 1936)^{g}
- Pimpla arjuna (Gupta & Saxena, 1987)^{c g}
- Pimpla arnoldi Benoit, 1953^{c g}
- Pimpla artemonis Kasparyan, 1973^{c g}
- Pimpla asiatica Kasparyan, 1973^{c g}
- Pimpla aurimicans (Enderlein, 1921)^{c g}
- Pimpla aviancae (Porter, 1970)^{c g}
- Pimpla azteca Cresson, 1874^{c g}
- Pimpla bactriana Kasparyan, 1974^{c g}
- Pimpla bicolor Brullé, 1846^{c g}
- Pimpla bilineata (Cameron, 1900)^{c g}
- Pimpla bistricta Morley, 1916^{c g}
- Pimpla bolivari (Porter, 1970)^{c g}
- Pimpla brithys (Porter, 1970)^{c g}
- Pimpla brumha (Gupta & Saxena, 1987)^{c g}
- Pimpla brunnea (Gupta & Saxena, 1987)^{c}
- Pimpla burgeoni Seyrig, 1937^{c g}
- Pimpla burmensis (Gupta & Saxena, 1987)^{c g}
- Pimpla caerulea Brullé, 1846^{c g}
- Pimpla caeruleata Cresson, 1874^{c g}
- Pimpla calliphora Morley, 1914^{c g}
- Pimpla cameronii Dalla Torre, 1901^{c g}
- Pimpla canaliculata Forster, 1888^{c g}
- Pimpla carinifrons Cameron, 1899^{c g}
- Pimpla carlosi Gauld, Ugalde & Hanson, 1998^{c g}
- Pimpla caucasica Kasparyan, 1974^{c g}
- Pimpla conchyliata Tosquinet, 1896^{c g}
- Pimpla contemplator (Müller, 1776)^{c g}
- Pimpla cossivora Curtis, 1826^{c g}
- Pimpla crocata Tosquinet, 1896^{c g}
- Pimpla croceipes Cresson, 1874^{c g}
- Pimpla croceiventris (Cresson, 1868)^{c g}
- Pimpla curiosa Forster, 1888^{c g}
- Pimpla curta (Momoi, 1973)^{c g}
- Pimpla cyanator Morley, 1914^{c g}
- Pimpla cyanea Szépligeti, 1908^{c g}
- Pimpla cyanipennis Brullé, 1846^{c}
- Pimpla cyclostigmata Statz, 1936^{c g}
- Pimpla daitojimana Sonan, 1940^{c g}
- Pimpla decaryi Seyrig, 1932^{c g}
- Pimpla decessa Scudder, 1878^{c g}
- Pimpla dimidiata (Townes, 1960)^{c g}
- Pimpla disparis Viereck, 1911^{c}
- Pimpla distincta (Momoi, 1971)^{c g}
- Pimpla dohrnii Ratzeburg, 1847^{c g}
- Pimpla dorsata (Dalla Torre, 1901)^{c g}
- Pimpla dravida (Gupta & Saxena, 1987)^{c g}
- Pimpla elegantissima Szepligeti, 1922^{c g}
- Pimpla ellopiae Harrington, 1892^{c g}
- Pimpla eocenica Cockerell, 1919^{c g}
- Pimpla ereba Cameron, 1899^{c g}
- Pimpla erythema (Porter, 1970)^{c g}
- Pimpla erythromera (Momoi, 1971)^{c}
- Pimpla exapta Forster, 1888^{c g}
- Pimpla experiens Forster, 1888^{c g}
- Pimpla exstirpator Forster, 1888^{c g}
- Pimpla fatua De Stefani, 1887^{c g}
- Pimpla femorella Kasparyan, 1974^{c g}
- Pimpla flavicoxis Thomson, 1877^{c g}
- Pimpla flavipalpis Cameron, 1899^{c g}
- Pimpla flavipennis (Enderlein, 1919)^{c g}
- Pimpla fraudator Forster, 1888^{c g}
- Pimpla fuscipes Brullé, 1846^{c g}
- Pimpla garuda (Gupta & Saxena, 1987)^{c g}
- Pimpla glandaria Costa, 1886^{c g}
- Pimpla golbachi (Porter, 1970)^{c g}
- Pimpla hesperus (Townes, 1960)^{c g}
- Pimpla himalayensis (Gupta & Saxena, 1987)^{c g}
- Pimpla hostifera Forster, 1888^{c g}
- Pimpla hova Seyrig, 1932^{c g}
- Pimpla hubendickae Gauld, 1991^{c g}
- Pimpla ichneumoniformis Cresson, 1874^{c g}
- Pimpla illecebrator (Villers, 1789)^{c g}
- Pimpla imitata Forster, 1888^{c g}
- Pimpla impuncta Lin, 1988^{c g}
- Pimpla indra Cameron, 1899^{c g}
- Pimpla indura Theobald, 1937^{c g}
- Pimpla inopinata Kasparyan, 1974^{c g}
- Pimpla insignatoria (Gravenhorst, 1807)^{c g}
- Pimpla rufipes (Miller, 1759)^{b}
- Pimpla iothales (Porter, 1970)^{c g}
- Pimpla isidroi Gauld, Ugalde & Hanson, 1998^{c g}
- Pimpla jakulicai (Porter, 1972)^{c g}
- Pimpla javensis (Gupta & Saxena, 1987)^{c g}
- Pimpla karakurti Rossikov, 1904^{c g}
- Pimpla kaszabi (Momoi, 1973)^{c g}
- Pimpla laevifrons Forster, 1888^{c g}
- Pimpla lamprotes (Porter, 1970)^{c g}
- Pimpla laothoe Cameron, 1897^{c g}
- Pimpla lasallei Diaz, 2000^{c g}
- Pimpla latistigma (Momoi, 1973)^{c g}
- Pimpla lignicola Ratzeburg, 1852^{c g}
- Pimpla limitata Forster, 1888^{c g}
- Pimpla luctuosa Smith, 1874^{c g}
- Pimpla maculiscaposa Seyrig, 1932^{c g}
- Pimpla madecassa (Saussure, 1892)^{c g}
- Pimpla mahalensis Gribodo, 1879^{c g}
- Pimpla marginella Brullé, 1846^{c g b}
- Pimpla maura Cresson, 1870^{c g b}
- Pimpla melanacrias Perkins, 1941^{c g}
- Pimpla meridionalis Benoit, 1956^{c g}
- Pimpla mitchelli Diaz, 2000^{c g}
- Pimpla morticina Brues, 1910^{c g}
- Pimpla murinanae Fahringer, 1943^{c}
- Pimpla nigricolor Tosquinet, 1903^{c g}
- Pimpla nigroaenea (Cushman, 1927)^{c g}
- Pimpla nigrohirsuta Strobl, 1902^{c g}
- Pimpla nipponica Uchida, 1928^{c g}
- Pimpla nuda Townes, 1940^{c g}
- Pimpla oehlkei (Momoi, 1973)^{c g}
- Pimpla orbitalis Ratzeburg, 1852^{c g}
- Pimpla oropha (Porter, 1970)^{c g}
- Pimpla pamirica Kasparyan, 1974^{c g}
- Pimpla parva (Momoi, 1973)^{c}
- Pimpla pedalis Cresson, 1865^{c g b}
- Pimpla pepsoides (Porter, 1970)^{c g}
- Pimpla perssoni Gauld, 1991^{c g}
- Pimpla picea (Gupta & Saxena, 1987)^{c g}
- Pimpla platysma (Porter, 1970)^{c g}
- Pimpla pluto Ashmead, 1906^{c g}
- Pimpla polychroma (Cushman, 1927)^{c g}
- Pimpla praesecta Forster, 1888^{c g}
- Pimpla processioneae Ratzeburg, 1849^{c g}
- Pimpla punicipes Cresson, 1874^{c g b}
- Pimpla pyramis (Porter, 1970)^{c g}
- Pimpla ramirezi (Porter, 1970)^{c g}
- Pimpla rasilis (Momoi, 1973)^{c g}
- Pimpla rediviva Brues, 1910^{c g}
- Pimpla renevieri Meunier, 1903^{c g}
- Pimpla revelata Brues, 1910^{c g}
- Pimpla rojasi Gauld, 1991^{c g}
- Pimpla romeroi Gauld, 1991^{c g}
- Pimpla rubripes Holmgren, 1868^{c}
- Pimpla rufonigra Cresson, 1865^{c g}
- Pimpla russula (Gupta & Saxena, 1987)^{c g}
- Pimpla sanguinipes Cresson, 1872^{c g b}
- Pimpla saussurei Heer, 1856^{c g}
- Pimpla sedula Cameron, 1886^{c g}
- Pimpla segnestami Gauld, 1991^{c g}
- Pimpla semirufa Brullé, 1846^{c g}
- Pimpla semitibialis (Gupta & Saxena, 1987)^{c g}
- Pimpla senecta Scudder, 1878^{c g}
- Pimpla senilis Brues, 1910^{c g}
- Pimpla seyrigi Theobald, 1937^{c g}
- Pimpla shiva (Gupta & Saxena, 1987)^{c g}
- Pimpla silvicola Walley, 1941^{c g}
- Pimpla sodalis Ruthe, 1859^{c g b}
- Pimpla sondrae Gauld, Ugalde & Hanson, 1998^{c g}
- Pimpla sordidella Holmgren, 1868^{c g}
- Pimpla sparsa (Porter, 1970)^{c g}
- Pimpla spectabilis Szépligeti, 1908^{c g}
- Pimpla speculifera Forster, 1888^{c g}
- Pimpla spilopteris (Momoi, 1973)^{c g}
- Pimpla spuria Gravenhorst, 1829^{c g}
- Pimpla stangei (Porter, 1970)^{c g}
- Pimpla stigmatica Henriksen, 1922^{c g}
- Pimpla stricklandi (Townes, 1960)^{c}
- Pimpla strigipleuris Thomson, 1877^{c g}
- Pimpla succini Giebel, 1856^{c g}
- Pimpla sumichrasti Cresson, 1874^{c g}
- Pimpla tafiae (Porter, 1970)^{c g}
- Pimpla taihokensis Uchida, 1930^{c g}
- Pimpla taprobanae Cameron, 1897^{c g}
- Pimpla tarapacae (Porter, 1970)^{c g}
- Pimpla tenuicornis Cresson, 1865^{c g}
- Pimpla thoracica Morley, 1914^{c g}
- Pimpla tomyris Schrottky, 1902^{c g}
- Pimpla trichroa (Porter, 1970)^{c g}
- Pimpla tuberculata Morley, 1914^{c}
- Pimpla turionellae (Linnaeus, 1758)^{c g b}
- Pimpla vangeli Diaz, 2000^{c g}
- Pimpla varians (Townes, 1960)^{c g}
- Pimpla varipes (Porter, 1970)^{c g}
- Pimpla vayonae Diaz, 2000^{c g}
- Pimpla viridescens Morley, 1914^{c g}
- Pimpla vumbana Benoit, 1953^{c g}
- Pimpla waterloti Seyrig, 1932^{c g}
- Pimpla wilchristi Fitton, Shaw & Gauld, 1988^{c g}
- Pimpla yungarum (Porter, 1970)^{c g}

Data sources: i = ITIS, c = Catalogue of Life, g = GBIF, b = Bugguide.net
