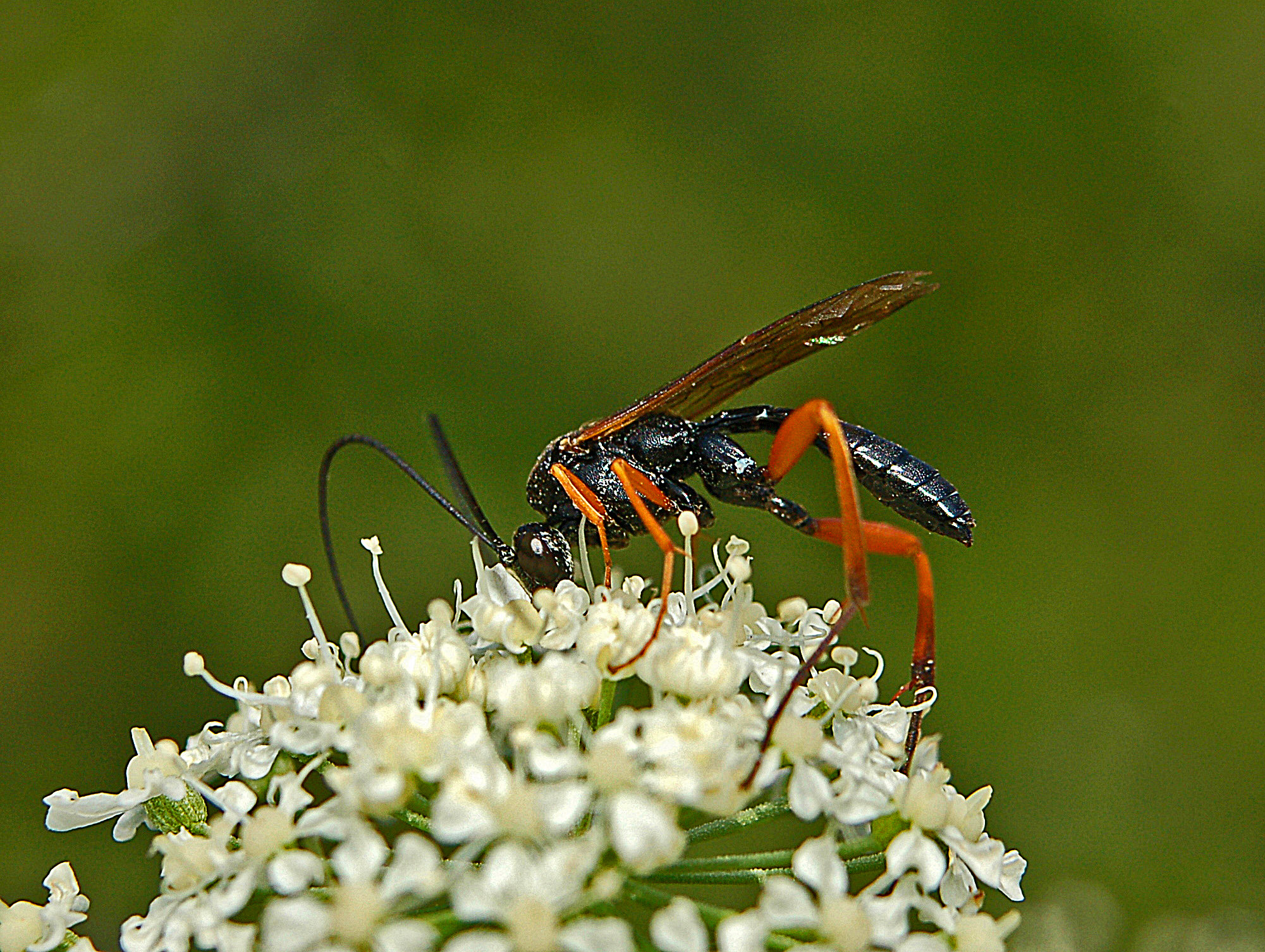
- Pimpla cf. rufipes

Scientific classification
- Kingdom: Animalia
- Phylum: Arthropoda
- Clade: Pancrustacea
- Class: Insecta
- Order: Hymenoptera
- Family: Ichneumonidae
- Subfamily: Pimplinae
- Tribe: Pimplini
- Genus: Pimpla; Fabricius, 1804

Synonyms
- Coccygomimus Saussure, 1892

= Pimpla =

Genus of insects

Pimpla are a worldwide genus of the parasitic wasp family Ichneumonidae. They are one of the largest genera within the subfamily Pimplinae.

Pimpla species are idiobiont endoparasitoids of Holometabola, often the pupae or pre-pupae of Lepidoptera. For instance, the common Pimpla rufipes parasitizes Pieris brassicae and Lymantria dispar.

They are generally sturdy black wasps with orange markings. The first tergite is box-like with the spiracle anterior to the middle.

This genus includes about 200 species.

== Selected species ==
- Pimpla aethiops Curtis 1828
- Pimpla apricaria Costa 1885
- Pimpla arcadica Kasparyan 1973
- Pimpla arctica Zetterstedt 1838
- Pimpla artemonis Kasparyan 1973
- Pimpla contemplator (Muller 1776)
- Pimpla coxalis Habermehl 1917
- Pimpla dimidiatus (Townes, 1960)
- Pimpla disparis Viereck, 1911
- Pimpla dorsata (Dalla Torre 1901)
- Pimpla flavicoxis Thomson 1877
- Pimpla glandaria Costa 1886
- Pimpla hesperus (Townes, 1960)
- Pimpla illecebrator (Villers 1789)
- Pimpla insignatoria (Gravenhorst 1807)
- Pimpla melanacrias Perkins 1941
- Pimpla murinanae Fahringer 1943
- Pimpla nigrohirsuta Strobl 1902
- Pimpla processioneae Ratzeburg 1849
- Pimpla rufipes (Miller 1759) - (syn. Pimpla instigator) - black slip wasp
- Pimpla sodalis Ruthe 1859
- Pimpla spuria Gravenhorst 1829
- Pimpla stricklandi (Townes, 1960)
- Pimpla turionellae (C. Linnaeus, 1758)
- Pimpla varians (Townes, 1960)
- Pimpla wilchristi Fitton, Shaw & Gauld 1988

== Distribution ==
The distribution of these wasps is Afrotropical, Eastern and Western Palaearctic, European, Nearctic, Palaearctic, Neotropical.

== Gallery ==
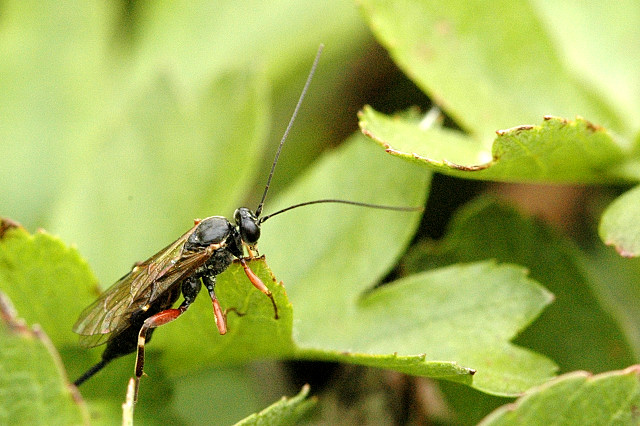
Pimpla turionellae

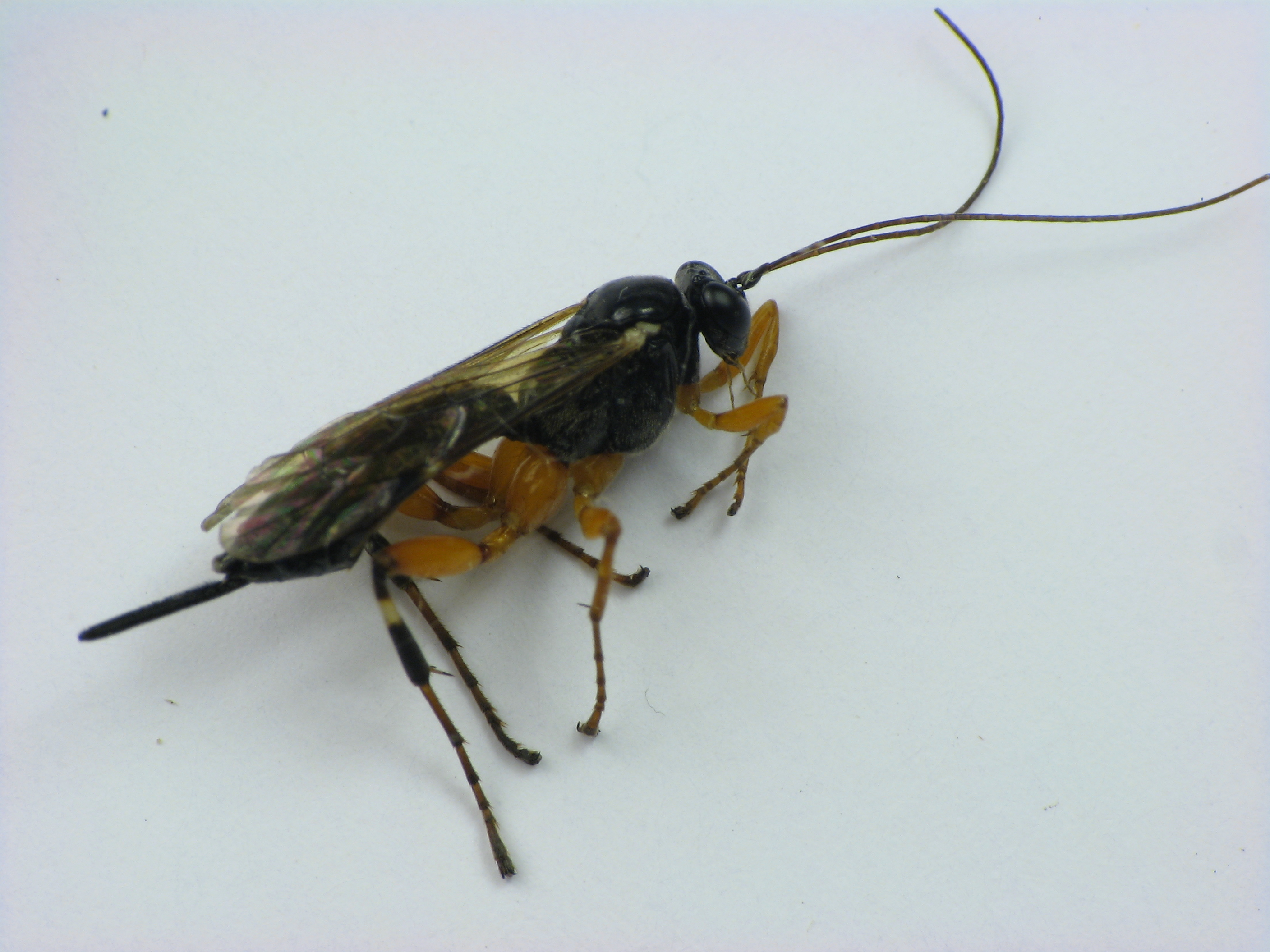
Pimpla sp., female

== See also ==
- List of Pimpla species
