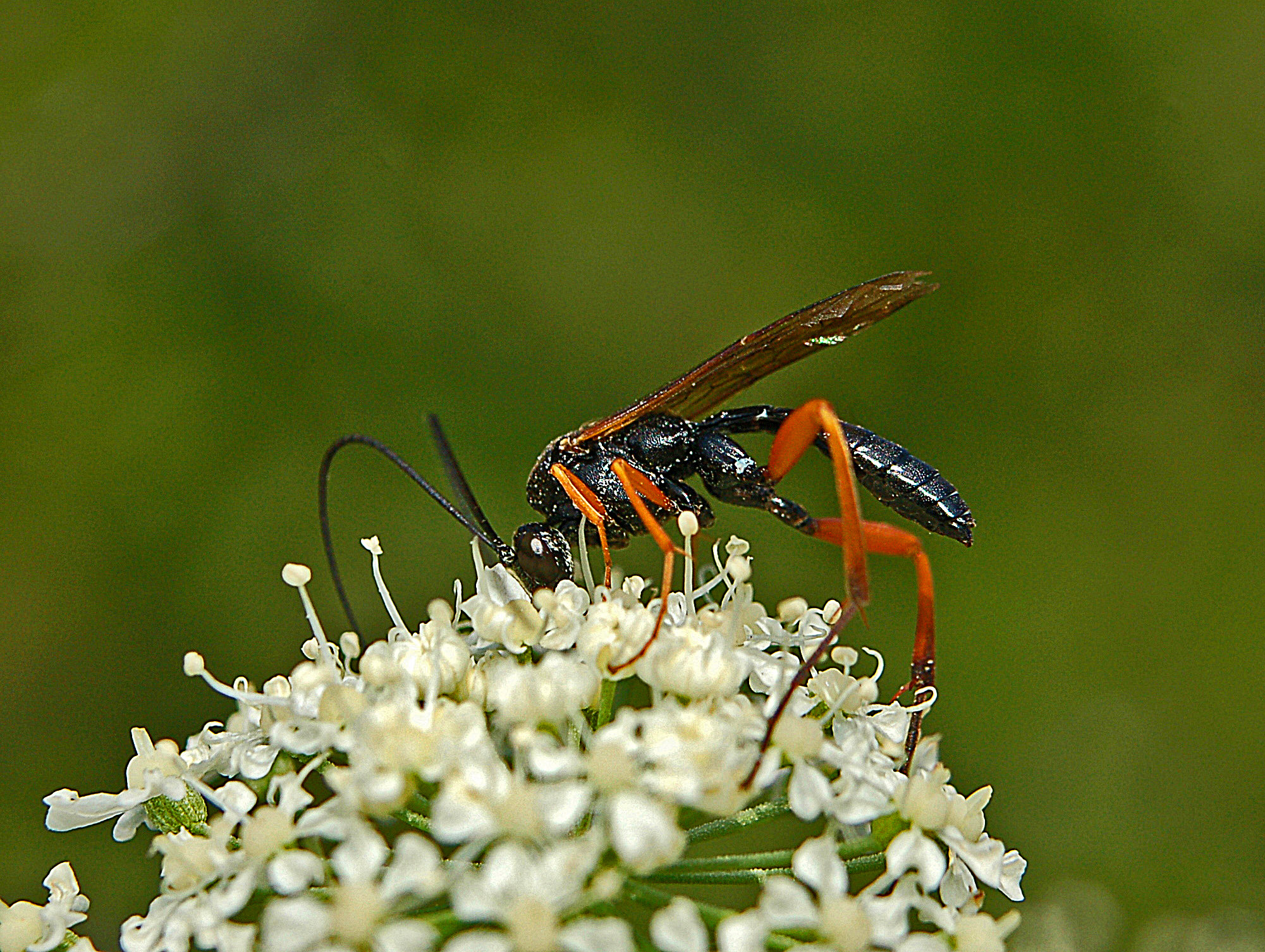
- Male Pimpla cf. rufipes

Scientific classification
- Kingdom: Animalia
- Phylum: Arthropoda
- Clade: Pancrustacea
- Class: Insecta
- Order: Hymenoptera
- Family: Ichneumonidae
- Genus: Pimpla
- Species: P. rufipes

Binomial name
- Pimpla rufipes (Miller, 1759)

Synonyms
- Pimpla instigator (Fabricius, 1793); Pimpla hypochondriaca (Retzius, 1783); Ichneumon instigator Fabricius, 1793; Ichneumon hypochondriaca Retzius, 1783; Ichneumon rufipes Miller, 1759

= Pimpla rufipes =

Species of wasp

Pimpla rufipes, the black slip wasp, is a species of wasp belonging to the family Ichneumonidae. It is distributed across Europe, Asia, and northern Africa.

== Taxonomy ==
The species Pimpla rufipes has several synonyms, which include Pimpla hypochondriaca and Pimpla instigator. Pimpla instigator (Fabricius, 1793) has been permanently rejected under the International code of Zoological Nomenclature, since the original name Ichneumon instigator Fabricius, 1793 is a junior homonym of Ichneumon instigator Rossius, 1790, which represents a pimpline species outside of the genus Pimpla.

== Distribution and habitat ==
This species can be found in the following countries: Afghanistan, Albania, Algeria, Armenia, Australia, Austria, Azerbaijan, Azores, Belarus, Belgium, Bulgaria, China, Croatia, Cyprus, Czech Republic, Denmark, Egypt, Estonia, Finland, France, Georgia, Germany, Greece, Hungary, India, Iran, Ireland, Italy, Japan, Kazakhstan, Korea, Kyrgyzstan, Latvia, Libya, Lithuania, Macedonia, Madeira Islands, Malta, Moldova, Mongolia, Morocco, Netherlands, Norway, Poland, Romania, Russia, Serbia & Montenegro, Slovakia, Spain, Sri Lanka, Sweden, Switzerland, Tajikistan, Tunisia, Turkey, Turkmenistan, Ukraine, United Kingdom, and Uzbekistan. These wasps mainly inhabit hedgerows and vegetated areas.

== Description ==
Pimpla rufipes can reach a length of about 15 mm (0.59 in) with a rather slender body. These wasps are generally black with bright orange legs. The hind legs are larger than the other pairs. The ovipositor is straight, quite short and thick, however the male Pimpla rufipes does not have an ovipositor. These wasps are often mistaken for Apechthis compunctor due to having similar size, and the males of both of the species are indistinguishable from photographs. The main key difference between these two species is the ovipositor: Pimpla rufipes females have a straight ovipositor while Apechthis compunctor females have curved ovipositors.

The front wing of Pimpla rufipes is 5.5 to 15 mm long. Its hind tibia is without a pale submedian band and the abdomen is finely mat to subpolished, usually rather closely dotted with tiny holes. Its first tergite is long, with a prominent dorsal hump centered just beyond the middle. The upper valve of ovipositor is also not or only weakly flattened.

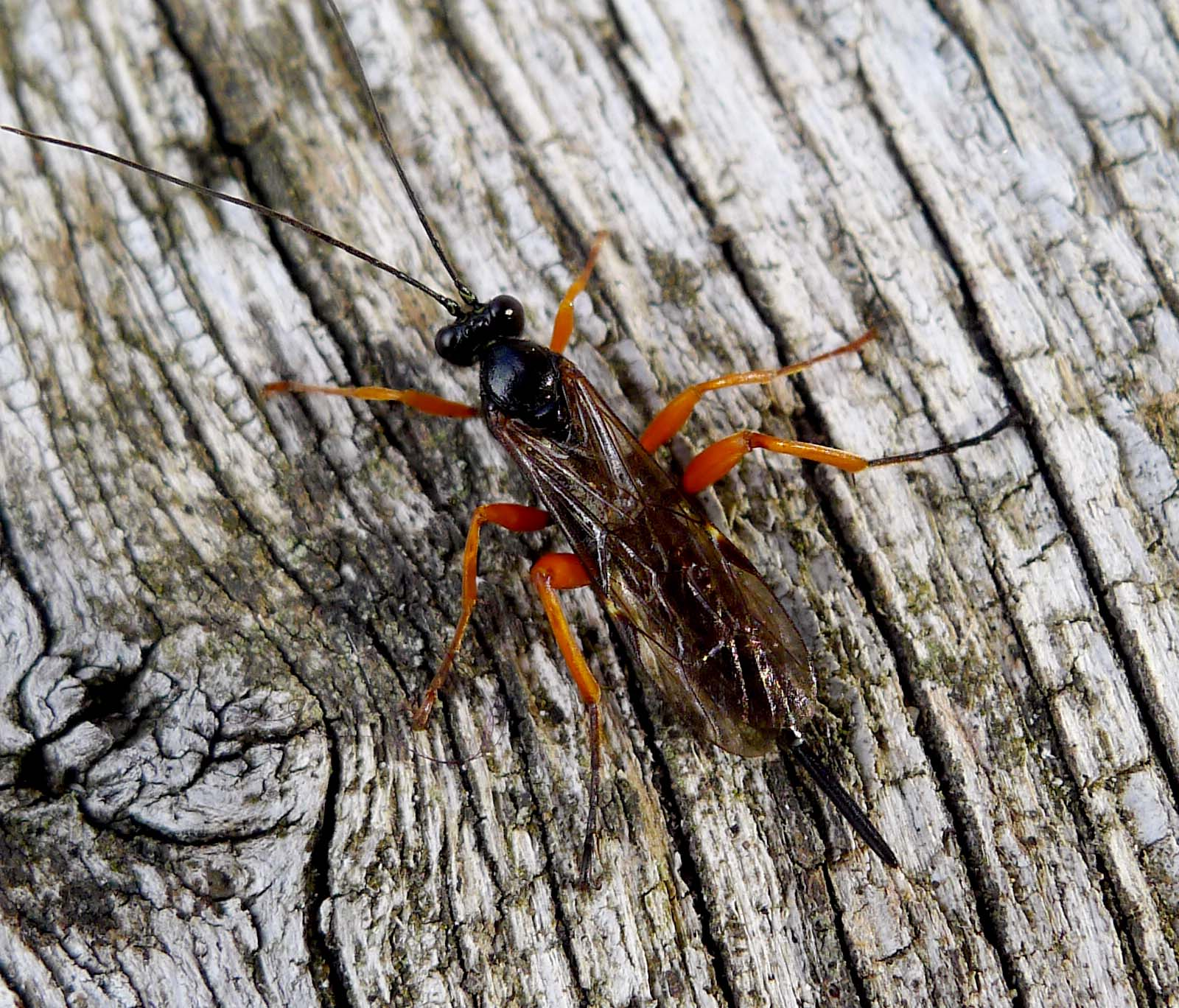

== Behaviour ==
A parasitoid of butterfly and moth larvae and pupae, laying an egg in each one. Pimpla rufipes have preferences in choosing their hosts that are affected by various factors. Research was conducted on cylinders which represent the hosts Pimpla rufipes would normally puncture. The first factor is the texture of the host; smooth cylinders were punctured more often than cylinders that had been roughened with sandpaper. The second factor is colour; the wasps discriminated between yellow and blue cylinders and could remember to associate the colours as a presence of a host, where blue was inherently preferred over yellow. The last known factor is whether or not a cylinder/host is open or closed ended, where only cylinders that were close ended were frequently punctured. These factors are tested by the female wasp using its antennae which send vibrations to make the object resonate before determining if the host will make for a suitable oviposition site. It is still unknown how these vibrations are created from the antennae, and the antennae are not utilized as drumsticks. However it is known that the wasp does not use a stridulatory organ to generate these noises. This is all part of Pimpla rufipes exploratory behaviour, and acoustic probing allow the females to find and locate prey.

== Reproduction ==
Pimpla rufipes is a idiobont endoparasitoid which means that hosts do not mature after parasitisation. Pimpla rufipes goes through five stages as a larva. At its first instar, the larva is already very big, which is why the female can only carry few eggs at a time. Pimpla rufipes goes through morphogical changes at every instar, which mostly last 24 hours each, although the fifth and last instar lasts for around 9 days on average.

== Diet ==
The larvae and adult versions of Pimpla rufipes feed on different food. The main hosts of this parasitic wasp are the large white butterfly (Pieris brassicae) and the spongy moth (Lymantria dispar). The larvae feed on the hosts that have been through parasitisation, one example of which is the tomato moth, Lacanobia oleracea. On the other hand, adults mainly feed on flowers.

== Venom ==
Pimpla rufipes is known to have a substantial amount of venom which is cytotoxic (causing cell death) and can paralyze its hosts. This paralysis of its hosts is due to a paralytic polypeptide called pimplin in its venom, which allows for an easy oviposition. Furthermore the venom of Pimpla rufipes has antibacterial properties to prevent bacterial entry into the host, similarly to other idiobont species.

Pimpla rufipes injects venom during oviposition to condition its hosts. The venom is a complex mixture of proteins and polypeptides, which have been identified as enzymes, including phenoloxidase, endopeptidase, aminopeptidase, hydrolase, and angiotensin-converting enzyme. Constituents of the venom seem to possess cytolytic and paralytic factors, but the causes responsible for the effects are still unknown. The venom caused changes regardless of whether an external source of calcium was present, or whether venom was pre-treated with PTU.

Several experiments have been run regarding the venom of Pimpla rufipes, as it is easy to culture on the tomato moth. When pupae of the tomato moth are injected with venom from Pimpla rufipes, they show an increased susceptibility to the fungal entomopathogen Metarhizium anisopliae Sorokin. This fact suggests that the venom of Pimpla rufipes may suppress the cellular immune defense mechanisms of L. oleracea. Injection of host pupae with the venom has a rapid, adverse effect on the normal respiration of L. oleracea. It is possible that severe changes to the host-metabolism may result in a general failure in the hosts' normal immune response defense. These findings are also supported from another experiment also using the tomato moth as a host. As the venom causes a general failure in the host's normal immune response, the venom would have to adversely affect haemocytes. This was shown in the experiment to be the case where "at sublethal doses venom has a potent anti-hemocyte action and can impair hemocyte-mediated immune responses."
