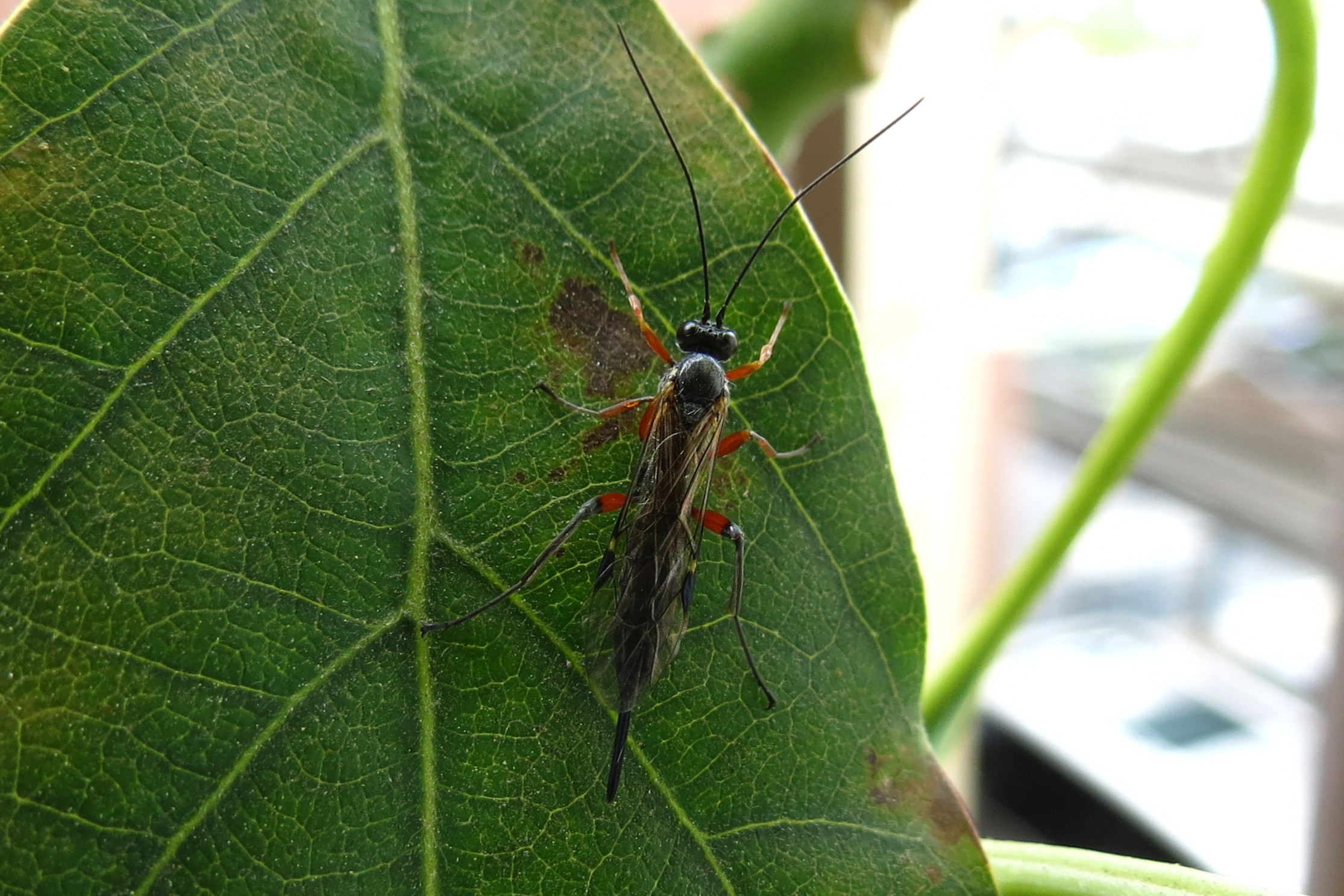

Scientific classification
- Kingdom: Animalia
- Phylum: Arthropoda
- Clade: Pancrustacea
- Class: Insecta
- Order: Hymenoptera
- Family: Ichneumonidae
- Genus: Pimpla
- Species: P. disparis

Binomial name
- Pimpla disparis Viereck, 1911

= Pimpla disparis =

Species of insects

Pimpla disparis is a species of Ichneumonidae wasp. It is a pupal parasitoid of Lymantria dispar, although it is a generalist parasitoid, attacking other species such as Thyridopteryx ephemeraeformis. It is native to the Palearctic realm, and has since the 1970s been introduced to the United States for biological pest control.
