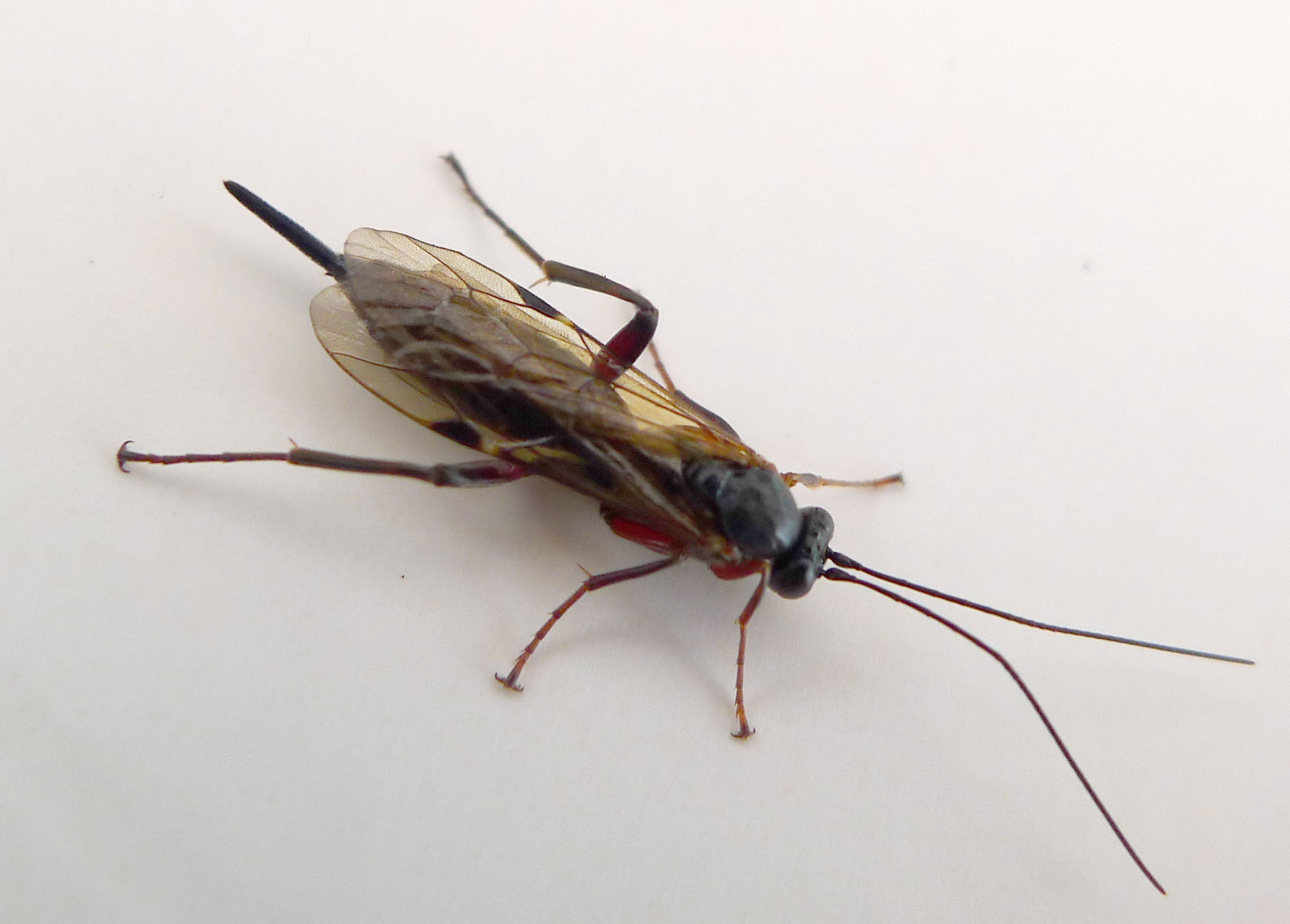

Scientific classification
- Kingdom: Animalia
- Phylum: Arthropoda
- Clade: Pancrustacea
- Class: Insecta
- Order: Hymenoptera
- Family: Ichneumonidae
- Genus: Pimpla
- Species: P. turionellae

Binomial name
- Pimpla turionellae (Linnaeus, 1758)

= Pimpla turionellae =

Species of wasp

Pimpla turionellae is a species of parasitoid wasp in the family Ichneumonidae. It attacks the larvae and pupae of various moths (including Galleria mellonella).

This parasitoid is able to kill hosts with just its venom through cytotoxicity, but in order to reproduce, the parasitoid must be present and lay its eggs inside the host.

== Behaviour ==
Adults must locate, paralyse & lay their eggs inside moth pupae. However, P. turionellae’s prey are highly concealed endophytes, meaning sight alone is not always efficient enough to reliably find well-hidden prey. Instead, P. turionellae can use vibrational sounding, allowing it to ‘echolocate’ through the substrate, using its antennae to transmit and detect vibrations. After receiving these signals, females insert their ovipositors toward density differences.

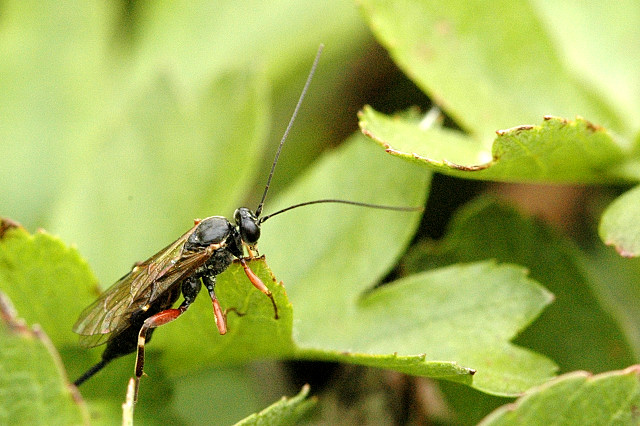

== Subspecies ==
These three subspecies belong to the species Pimpla turionellae:

- Pimpla turionellae basiflava Constantineanu & Ciochia, 1967^{c g}
- Pimpla turionellae moraguesi Schmiedeknecht, 1888^{c g}
- Pimpla turionellae turionellae^{g}

Data sources: i = ITIS, c = Catalogue of Life, g = GBIF, b = Bugguide.net
