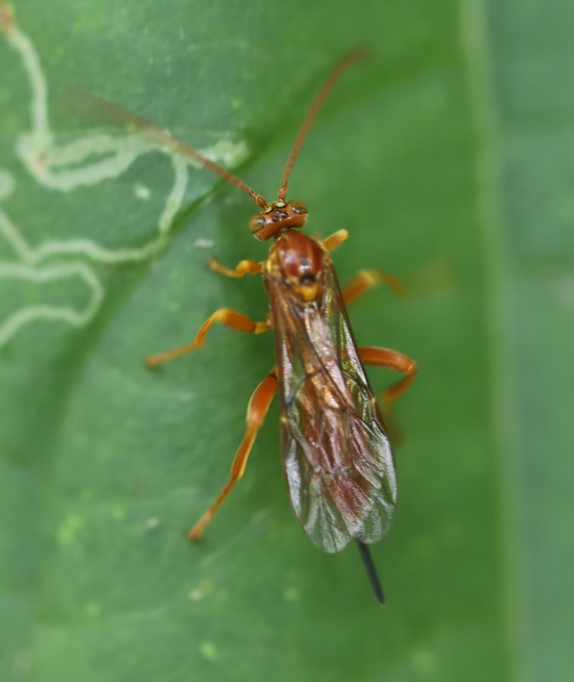
- Theronia atalantae

Scientific classification
- Kingdom: Animalia
- Phylum: Arthropoda
- Clade: Pancrustacea
- Class: Insecta
- Order: Hymenoptera
- Family: Ichneumonidae
- Tribe: Theroniini
- Genus: Theronia; Holmgren, 1859

= Theronia =

Genus of wasps

Theronia is a genus of ichneumon wasps in the family Ichneumonidae. There are at least 30 described species in the genus Theronia. The genus has a worldwide distribution and includes species that are endoparasitoids or hyperparasitoids of Lepidoptera.

== Species ==
These 39 species belong to the genus Theronia:

- Theronia angustatrix Seyrig, 1934^{c g}
- Theronia arrosor (Tosquinet, 1903)^{c g}
- Theronia atalantae (Poda, 1761)^{c g b}
- Theronia atralaris Gupta, 1962^{c g}
- Theronia badia Gupta, 1962^{c g}
- Theronia brachyura Gupta, 1962^{c g}
- Theronia brunettea Gupta, 1962^{c g}
- Theronia clathrata Krieger, 1899^{c g}
- Theronia compacta Gupta, 1962^{c g}
- Theronia depressa Gupta, 1962^{c g}
- Theronia destructor (Smith, 1863)^{c g}
- Theronia dimidia Gupta, 1962^{c g}
- Theronia flava Gupta, 1962^{c g}
- Theronia flaviceps (Brulle, 1846)^{c}
- Theronia flavistigma Morley, 1914^{c g}
- Theronia flavopuncta Gupta, 1962^{c g}
- Theronia fraucai Gauld, 1984^{c g}
- Theronia frontella Gupta, 1962^{c g}
- Theronia hilaris (Say, 1829)^{c g b}
- Theronia hispida Gupta, 1962^{c g}
- Theronia laevigata (Tschek, 1869)^{c g}
- Theronia lucida (Cameron, 1903)^{c g}
- Theronia lurida Tosquinet, 1896^{c}
- Theronia maculosa Krieger, 1906^{c g}
- Theronia maskeliyae Cameron, 1905^{c g}
- Theronia nigrivertex Gupta, 1962^{c g}
- Theronia placida (Smith, 1860)^{c g}
- Theronia pseudozebra Gupta, 1962^{c g}
- Theronia punctata Gupta, 1962^{c g}
- Theronia pygmaea Gupta, 1962^{c g}
- Theronia rectangulata Gupta, 1962^{c g}
- Theronia simillima Turner, 1919^{c g}
- Theronia steindachneri Krieger, 1906^{c g}
- Theronia trilineata (Brulle, 1846)^{c g}
- Theronia unilineata Gupta, 1962^{c g}
- Theronia univittata Seyrig, 1935^{c g}
- Theronia viridis Gupta, 1962^{c g}
- Theronia wickhami Cockerell, 1919^{c g}
- Theronia zebra (Vollenhoven, 1879)^{c g}

Data sources: i = ITIS, c = Catalogue of Life, g = GBIF, b = Bugguide.net
