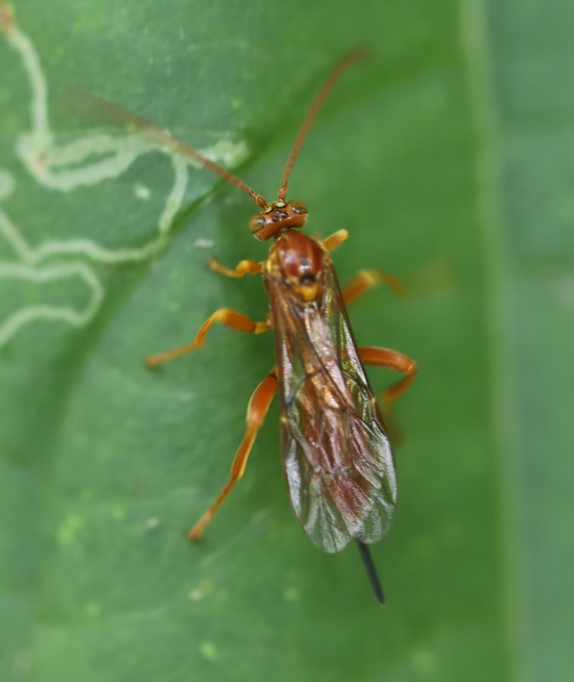

Scientific classification
- Kingdom: Animalia
- Phylum: Arthropoda
- Clade: Pancrustacea
- Class: Insecta
- Order: Hymenoptera
- Family: Ichneumonidae
- Genus: Theronia
- Species: T. atalantae

Binomial name
- Theronia atalantae (Poda, 1761)

= Theronia atalantae =

Species of wasp

Theronia atalantae is a species of ichneumon wasp in the family Ichneumonidae.

== Subspecies ==
These four subspecies belong to the species Theronia atalantae:

- Theronia atalantae atalantae^{g}
- Theronia atalantae fulvescens (Cresson, 1865)^{b}
- Theronia atalantae gestator (Thunberg, 1822)^{c g}
- Theronia atalantae himalayensis Gupta, 1983^{c g}

Data sources: i = ITIS, c = Catalogue of Life, g = GBIF, b = Bugguide.net
