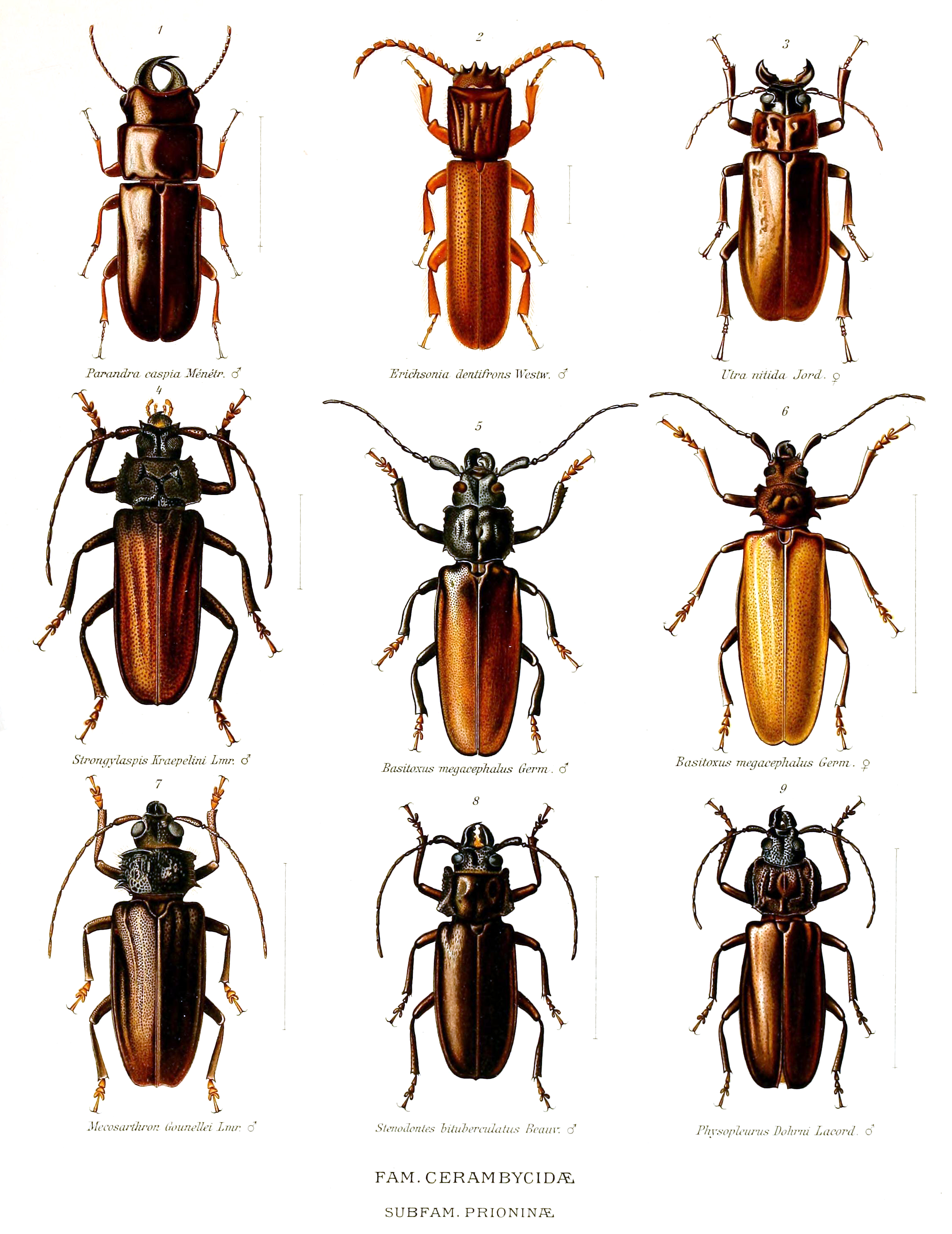

Scientific classification
- Kingdom: Animalia
- Phylum: Arthropoda
- Class: Insecta
- Order: Coleoptera
- Suborder: Polyphaga
- Infraorder: Cucujiformia
- Family: Cerambycidae
- Subfamily: Prioninae; Latreille, 1802

Tribes
- Acanthophorini; Aegosomatini; Anacolini; Cacoscelini; Callipogonini; Calocomini; Cantharocnemini; Catypnini; Closterini; Ergatini; Eurypodini; Hopliderini; Macrodontiini; Macrotomini; Mallaspini; Mallodonini; Meroscelisini; Osphryonini; Prionini; Rhipidocerini; Sceleocanthini; Solenopterini; Tereticini

= Prioninae =

Subfamily of beetles

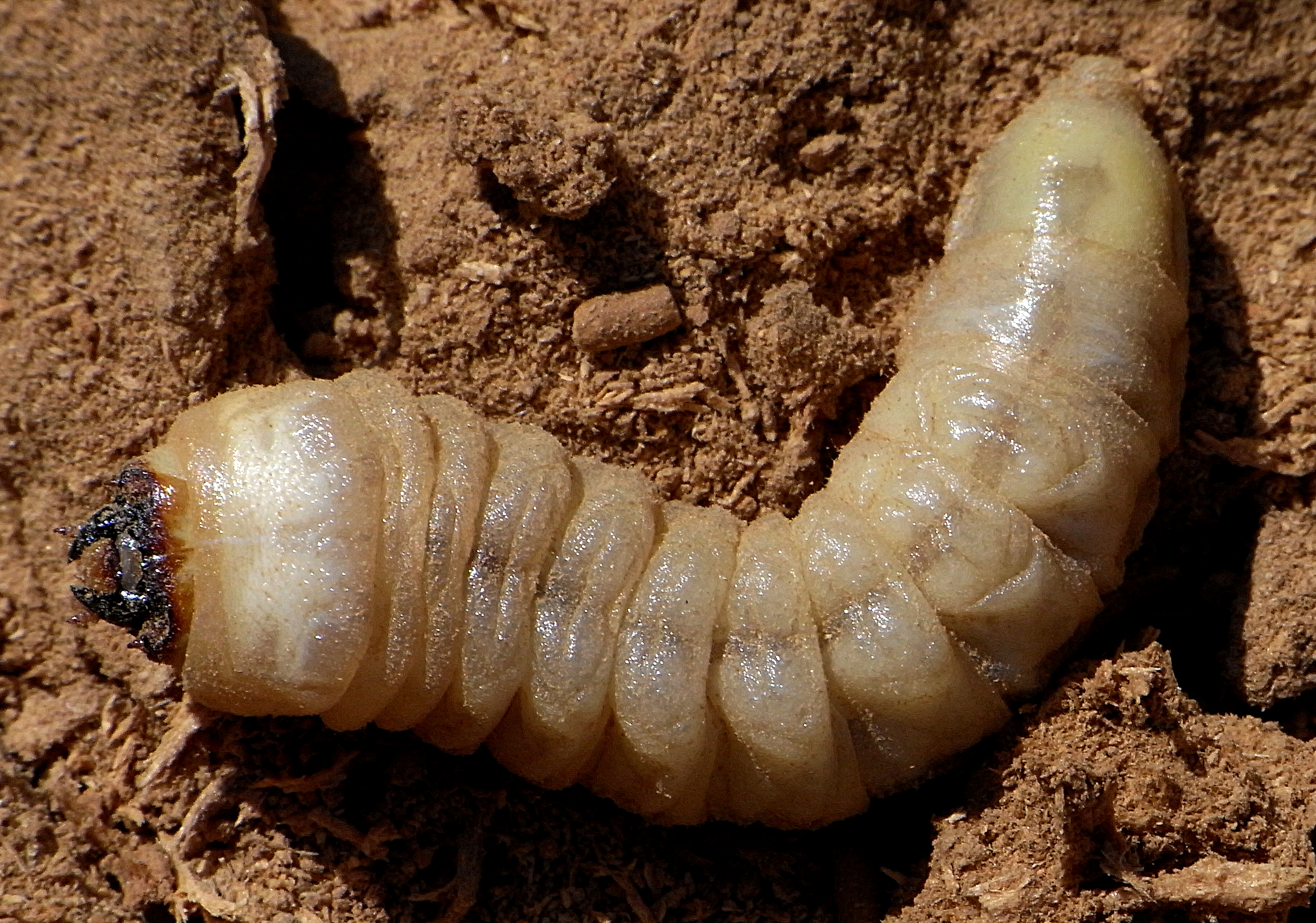
Ergates faber larva

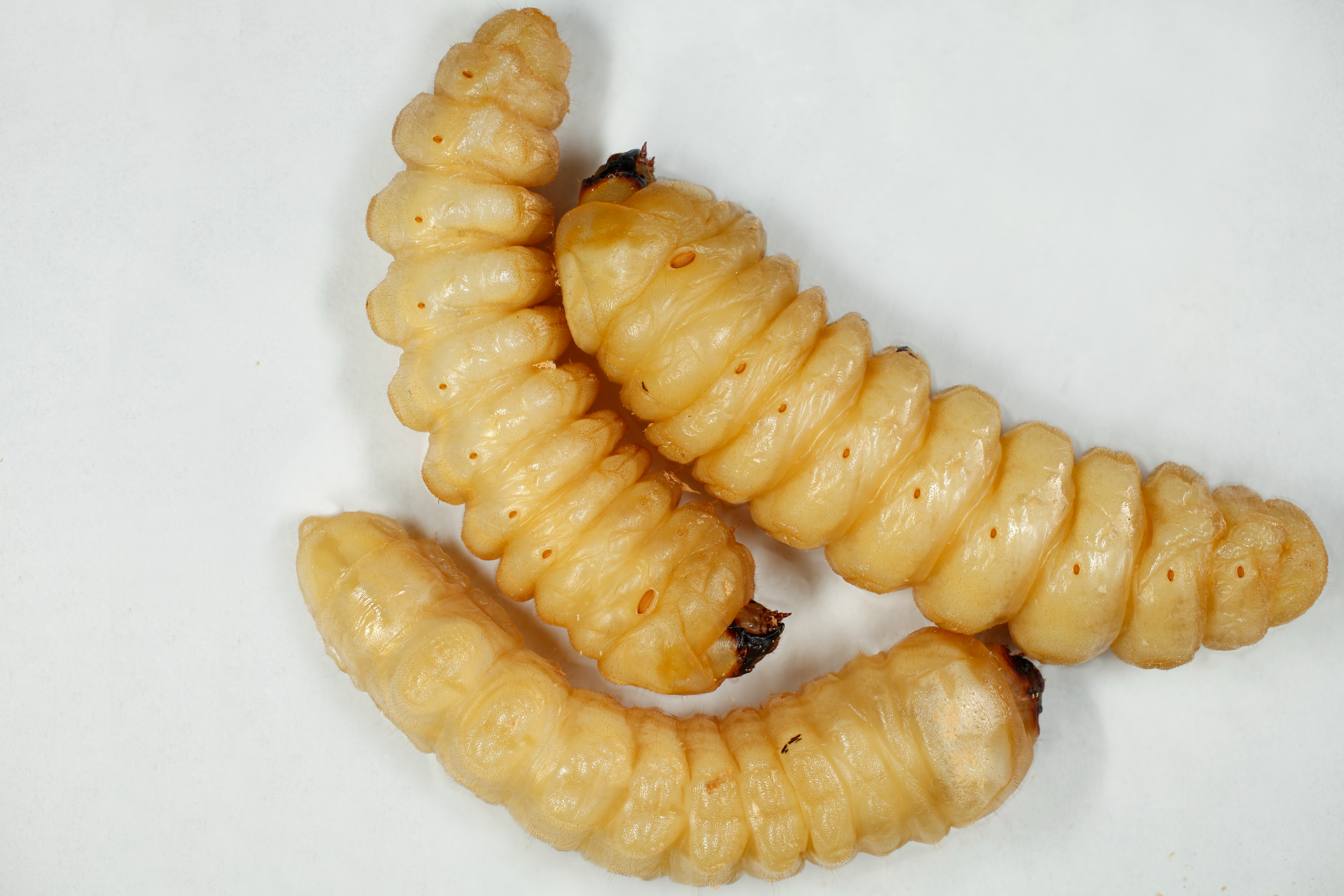
Prionoplus reticularis, larva

The Prioninae are a subfamily of Cerambycidae (long-horned beetles). They are typically large (25–70 mm) and usually brown or black. The males of a few genera sport large mandibles that are used in fights with other males, similar to stag beetles. These beetles are commonly nocturnal and are attracted to light. The majority of the Prioninae whose biology is known are borers whose larvae feed on rotting wood or roots.

== Genera ==
The following genera are recognised in the subfamily Prioninae:

- Acalodegma Thomson, 1877
- Acanthinodera Hope, 1835
- Acanthophorus Audinet-Serville, 1832
- Aegolipton Gressitt, 1940
- Aegosoma Audinet-Serville, 1832
- Aerogrammus Bates, 1875
- Aesa Lameere, 1912
- Afraustraloderes Bouyer, 2012
- Agrianome Thomson, 1864
- Allaiocerus Galileo, 1987
- Allomallodon Santos-Silva & Galileo, 2010
- Anacolus Berthold, 1827
- Analophus Waterhouse, 1877
- Ancistrotus Audinet-Serville, 1832
- Andinotrichoderes Tippmann, 1960
- Anoeme Gahan, 1890
- Anomophysis Quentin & Villiers, 1981
- Anomotoma Quentin & Villiers, 1978
- Anoplotoma Quentin & Villiers, 1973
- Anthracocentrus Quentin & Villiers, 1983
- Aplagiognathus Thomson, 1861
- Apocaulus Quentin & Villiers, 1977
- Apotrophus Bates, 1875
- Apterocaulus Fairmaire, 1864
- Arba Quentin & Villiers, 1977
- Archetypus Thomson, 1861
- Archodontes Lameere, 1903
- Archotoma Quentin & Villiers, 1978
- Atrocolus Monné M. A. & Monné M. L., 2008
- Aulacopus Audinet-Serville, 1832
- Aulacotoma Quentin & Villiers, 1973
- Bandar Lameere, 1912
- Baralipton Thomson, 1857
- Basitoxus Audinet-Serville, 1832
- Basorus Bouchard & Bousquet, 2024, nom. nov. for Sobarus Harold, 1879
- Bifidoprionus Komiya & Keyzer, 2011
- Biribellus Galileo, 1987
- Bouyerus Drumont, 2007
- Bracheocentrus Quentin & Villiers, 1983
- Braderochus Buquet, 1852
- Brephilydia Pascoe, 1871
- Cacodacnus Thomson, 1861
- Cacosceles Newman, 1838
- Callergates Lameere, 1904
- Callipogon Audinet-Serville, 1832
- Callistoprionus Tippmann, 1953
- Calloctenus White, 1850
- Calocomus Audinet-Serville, 1832
- Cantharocnemis Audinet-Serville, 1832
- Cantharoctenus Westwood, 1866
- Casiphia Fairmaire, 1894
- Catypnes Pascoe, 1864
- Ceratocentrus Aurivillius, 1903
- Chalcoprionus Bates, 1875
- Chalybophysis Quentin & Villiers, 1981
- Chariea Audinet-Serville, 1832
- Charmallaspis Galileo & Martins, 1992
- Chiasmetes Pascoe, 1867
- Chorenta Gistel, 1848
- Clesotrus Quentin & Villiers, 1974
- Closterus Audinet-Serville, 1832
- Cnemoplites Newman, 1842
- Crossocnemis Quentin & Villiers, 1978
- Cryptipus Jin, de Keyzer & Ślipiński, 2020
- Cryptobelus Thomson, 1878
- Ctenoscelis Audinet-Serville, 1832
- Cubaecola Lameere, 1912
- Curitiba Lameere, 1903
- Cyanolipton Komiya, 2004
- Cycloprionus Tippmann, 1953
- Dandamis Gahan, 1906
- Delocheilus Thomson, 1861
- Derancistrachroma Lingafelter, 2015
- Derancistrus Audinet-Serville, 1832
- Derelophis Quentin & Villiers, 1972
- Derobrachus Audinet-Serville, 1832
- Dinoprionus Bates, 1875
- Diseoblax Quentin & Villiers, 1981
- Dorysthenes Vigors, 1826
- Droserotoma Quentin & Villiers, 1978
- Drumontiana Danilevsky, 2001
- Dysiatus Pascoe, 1869
- Eboraphyllus Mckeown, 1945
- Elaptoides Quentin & Villiers, 1974
- Elaptus Pascoe, 1867
- Elateropsis Chevrolat, 1862
- Emphiesmenus Lansberge, 1884
- Enneaphyllus Waterhouse, 1877
- Enoplocerus Audinet-Serville, 1832
- Eotithoes Quentin & Villiers, 1983
- Episacus Waterhouse, 1880
- Ergates Audinet-Serville, 1832
- Erioderus Thomson, 1861
- Erythraenus Bates, 1875
- Esmeralda Thomson, 1861
- Ethioeme Adlbauer, 2008
- Eudianodes Pascoe, 1868
- Eurynassa Thomson, 1864
- Eurypoda Saunders, 1853
- Flabellomorphus Galileo & Martins, 1990
- Galileoana Chemsak, 1998
- Glyphosoma Quentin & Villiers, 1973
- Gnathonyx Gahan, 1894
- Guedesia Ferreira & Veiga-Ferreira, 1952
- Hagrides Jin, de Keyzer & Ślipiński, 2020
- Hastertia Lameere, 1912
- Hephialtes Thomson, 1864
- Hermerius Newman, 1844
- Hileolaspis Galileo & Martins, 1992
- Hisarai Santos-Silva & Martins, 2006
- Holonotus Thomson, 1861
- Homoeomyzo Galileo, Komiya & Santos-Silva, 2018
- Hoplideres Audinet-Serville, 1832
- Hoplidosterus Gilmour, 1962
- Hovatoma Lameere, 1912
- Hovorelus Galileo & Monné, 2003
- Hovorodon Santos-Silva, Swift & Nearns, 2010
- Howea Olliff, 1889
- Hyleoza Galileo, 1987
- Hystatoderes Lameere, 1917
- Hystatus Thomson, 1861
- Ialyssus Thomson, 1864
- Insuetaspis Galileo & Martins, 1992
- Jamwonus Harold, 1879
- Komiyasoma Drumont & Do, 2013
- Lachneophysis Quentin & Villiers, 1978
- Lasiogaster Gahan, 1892
- Leiophysis Quentin & Villiers, 1973
- Leiotoma Quentin & Villiers, 1978
- Leontiprionus Quentin & Villiers, 1973
- Lobarthron Semenov, 1900
- Logaeus Waterhouse, 1881
- Lulua Burgeon, 1931
- Lundgrenosis Quentin, 1985
- Macrodontia Lacordaire, 1830
- Macrophysis Quentin & Villiers, 1981
- Macroprionus Semenov, 1900
- Macrotoma Audinet-Serville, 1832
- Mallaspis Audinet-Serville, 1832
- Mallodon Lacordaire, 1830
- Mallodonhoplus Thomson, 1861
- Mallodonopsis Thomson, 1861
- Mecosarthron Buquet, 1840
- Megobaralipton Lepesme & Breuning, 1952
- Megopis Audinet-Serville, 1832
- Meroscelisus Audinet-Serville, 1832
- Mesoprionus Jakovlev, 1887
- Metaegosoma Komiya & Drumont, 2012
- Methylethelius Zubov & Titarenko, 2019
- Microarthron Pic, 1900
- Microphysis Komiya & Drumont, 2008
- Microplophorus Blanchard, 1851
- Miniprionus Danilevsky, 2000
- Monocladum Pic, 1898
- Monodesmus Audinet-Serville, 1832
- Motilon Botero, Galileo & Santos-Silva, 2019
- Myzomorphus Sallé, 1850
- Nannoprionus Aurivillius, 1907
- Nataloma Corinta-Ferreira & Veiga-Ferreira, 1952
- Navosoma Blanchard, 1847
- Navosomopsis Thomson, 1877
- Neoma Santos-Silva, Thomas & Wappes, 2011
- Neomallodon Linsley, 1957
- Neosarmydus Fisher, 1935
- Nepiodes Pascoe, 1867
- Nesopriona Quentin & Villiers, 1973
- Nicias Thomson, 1857
- Nocalusa Santos-Silva & Galileo, 2018
- Nothopleurus Lacordaire, 1869
- Notophysis Audinet-Serville, 1832
- Ochroptera Quentin & Villiers, 1973
- Oideterus Thomson, 1857
- Olethrius Thomson, 1861
- Ommatomenus Higgins, 1869
- Omotagus Pascoe, 1867
- Opisognathus Thomson, 1861
- Oropyrodes Galileo & Martins, 1992
- Orthomegas Audinet-Serville, 1832
- Orthosoma Audinet-Serville, 1832
- Osphryon Pascoe, 1869
- Otheostethus Bates, 1872
- Palaeomegopis Boppe, 1911
- Papunya Jin, de Keyzer & Ślipiński, 2020
- Parachorenta Delahaye & Santos-Silva, 2016
- Paradandamis Aurivillius, 1922
- Paramacrotoma Corinta-Ferreira & Veiga-Ferreira, 1952
- Parapsilotarsus Danilevsky, 2018
- Parastrongylaspis Giesbert, 1987
- Parelaptus Lameere, 1915
- Paroplites Lameere, 1903
- Paulhutchinsonia Jin, de Keyzer & Ślipiński, 2020
- Pedoprionus Komoya, 2021
- Phaolus Pascoe, 1863
- Phlyctenosis Quentin & Villiers, 1973
- Physopleurus Lacordaire, 1869
- Piesacus Galileo, 1987
- Pingblax Komiya & Drumont, 2001
- Pixodarus Fairmaire, 1887
- Platygnathus Audinet-Serville, 1832
- Plumiprionus Lin & Danilevsky, 2017
- Poecilopyrodes Galileo & Martins, 1992
- Poekilosoma Audinet-Serville, 1832
- Pogonarthron Semenov, 1900
- Polyarthron Audinet-Serville, 1832
- Polylobarthron Semenov, 1900
- Polyoza Audinet-Serville, 1832
- Ponchelibius Komiya & Drumont, 2007
- Praemallaspis Galileo & Martins, 1992
- Prinobius Mulsant, 1842
- Prionacalus White, 1845
- Prionapterus Guérin-Méneville, 1831
- Prionoblemma Jakovlev, 1887
- Prionocornis Pic, 1928
- Prionomma White, 1853
- Prionoplus White, 1843
- Prionotoma Kolbe, 1894
- Prionus Geoffroy, 1762
- Priotyrannus Thomson, 1857
- Prosternodes Thomson, 1861
- Protorma Waterhouse, 1880
- Psalidocoptus White, 1856
- Psalidognathus Gray, 1832
- Psalidosphryon Komiya, 2001
- Psephactus Harold, 1879
- Pseudoplites Lameere, 1916
- Pseudoprionus Pic, 1898
- Psilotarsus Motschulsky, 1860
- Pyrodes Audinet-Serville, 1832
- Quercivir Lameere, 1912
- Remphan Waterhouse, 1835
- Rhachicolus Galileo, 1987
- Rhaesus Motschulsky, 1875
- Rhaphipodus Audinet-Serville, 1832
- Rhineimegopis Komiya & Drumont, 2001
- Rhipidocerus Westwood, 1842
- Rhodocharis Lacordaire, 1869
- Rodriguezius Quentin & Villiers, 1973
- Rugosophysis Komiya & Drumont, 2008
- Samolethrius Vitali, 2008
- Sarifer Kirsch, 1871
- Sarmydus Pascoe, 1867
- Sarothrogastra Karsch, 1881
- Scatopyrodes Galileo & Martins, 1992
- Sceleocantha Newman, 1840
- Schizodontus Quentin & Villiers, 1974
- Seabria Corinta-Ferreira & Veiga-Ferreira, 1952
- Seticeros Perger & Santos-Silva, 2010
- Solenoptera Audinet-Serville, 1832
- Sphenostethus Haldeman, 1848
- Spiloprionus Aurivillius, 1897
- Spinimegopis Ohbayashi, 1963
- Stenodontes Audinet-Serville, 1832
- Stictosomus Audinet-Serville, 1832
- Stolidodere Aurivillius, 1914
- Strongylaspis Thomson, 1861
- Tagalog Hüdepohl, 1987
- Talupes Quentin & Villiers, 1974
- Teispes Thomson, 1864
- Tereticus Waterhouse, 1879
- Tersec Lameere, 1912
- Titanus Audinet-Serville, 1832
- Tithoes Thomson, 1864
- Toxeutes Newman, 1840
- Tragosoma Audinet-Serville, 1832
- Trichocnemis LeConte, 1851
- Trichoderes Chevrolat, 1843
- Trichophysis Quentin & Villiers, 1973
- Trichoprionus Fragoso & Monné, 1982
- Tropidoprion Quentin & Villiers, 1973
- Typoma Quentin & Villiers, 1978
- Ucai Galileo & Martins, 2009
- Unilaprionus Lin & Danilevsky, 2017
- Utra Jordan, 1895
- Vandewegheia Bouyer & Susini, 2009
- Vietetropis Komiya, 1997
- Xanthonicias Galileo, 1987
- Xaurus Pascoe, 1867
- Xixuthrus Thomson, 1864
- Ziglipton Komiya, 2003
- Zooblax Thomson, 1877
