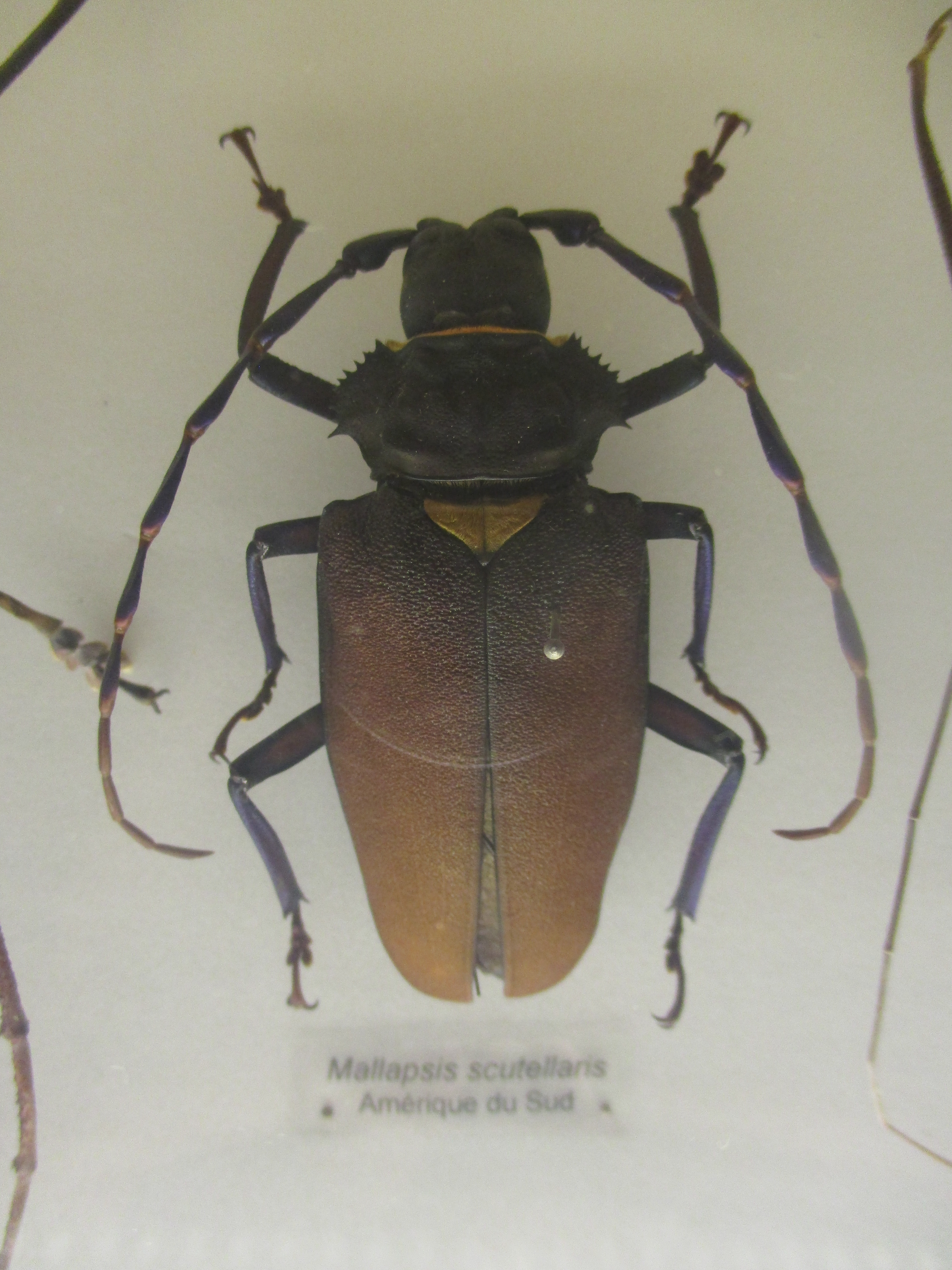

Scientific classification
- Kingdom: Animalia
- Phylum: Arthropoda
- Clade: Pancrustacea
- Class: Insecta
- Order: Coleoptera
- Suborder: Polyphaga
- Infraorder: Cucujiformia
- Family: Cerambycidae
- Subfamily: Prioninae
- Tribe: Mallaspini
- Genus: Mallaspis; Audinet-Serville 1832
- Species: M. scutellaris

Binomial name
- Mallaspis scutellaris (Olivier, 1795)

= Mallaspis =

Mallaspis scutellaris

Genus of beetles

Mallaspis is a genus of beetles in the family Cerambycidae. It is monotypic, being represented by the single species Mallaspis scutellaris.
