= Monodesmus =

Scientific classification
- Kingdom: Animalia
- Phylum: Arthropoda
- Clade: Pancrustacea
- Class: Insecta
- Order: Coleoptera
- Suborder: Polyphaga
- Infraorder: Cucujiformia
- Family: Cerambycidae
- Subfamily: Prioninae
- Tribe: Meroscelisini
- Genus: Monodesmus; Audinet-Serville, 1832

Genus of beetles

Monodesmus is a genus of beetles in the family Cerambycidae, containing the following species:

- Monodesmus atratus Fisher, 1932
- Monodesmus callidioides Audinet-Serville, 1832
- Monodesmus inermis Galileo, 1987
- Monodesmus nothus Chevrolat, 1862
