= Hisarai =

Scientific classification
- Kingdom: Animalia
- Phylum: Arthropoda
- Clade: Pancrustacea
- Class: Insecta
- Order: Coleoptera
- Suborder: Polyphaga
- Infraorder: Cucujiformia
- Family: Cerambycidae
- Subfamily: Prioninae
- Tribe: Mallodonini
- Genus: Hisarai; Santos-Silva & Martins, 2005
- Species: H. seripierriae

Binomial name
- Hisarai seripierriae (Santos-Silva & Martins, 2003)

Genus of beetles

Hisarai is a genus of beetles in the family Cerambycidae. It is monotypic, being represented by the single species Hisarai seripierriae.
