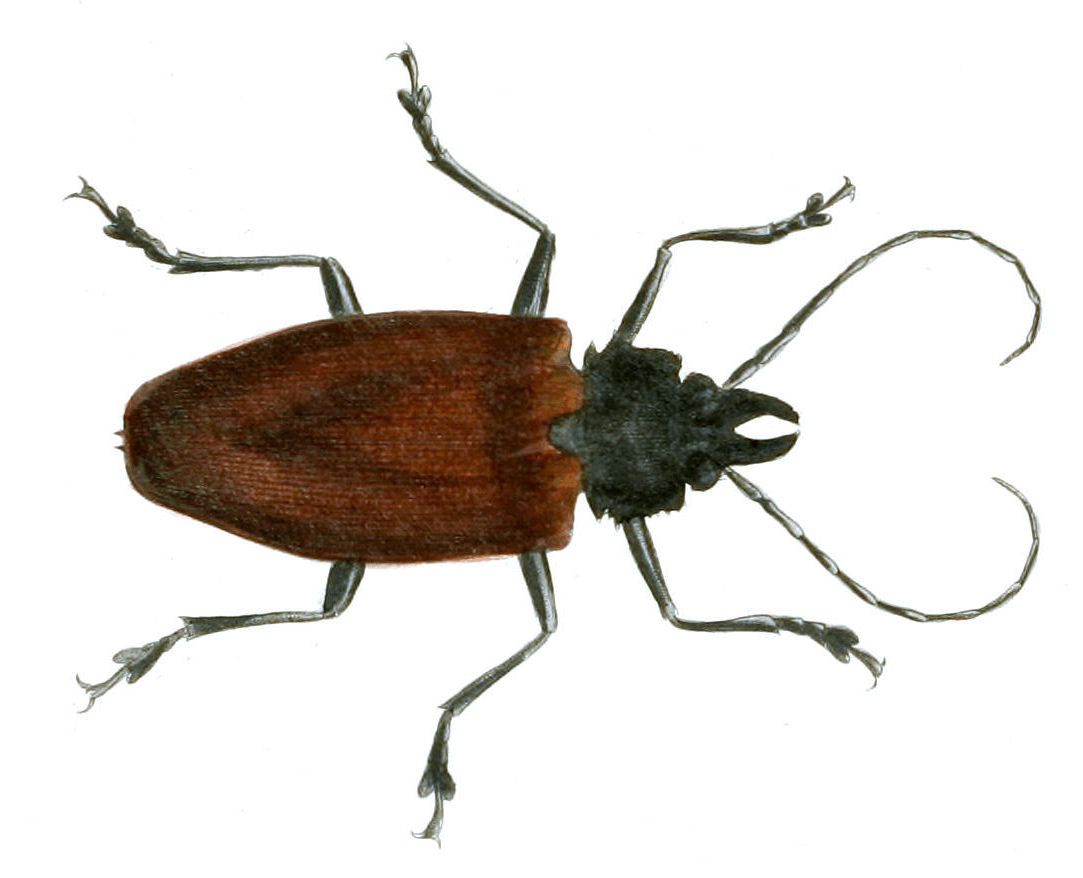

Scientific classification
- Kingdom: Animalia
- Phylum: Arthropoda
- Clade: Pancrustacea
- Class: Insecta
- Order: Coleoptera
- Suborder: Polyphaga
- Infraorder: Cucujiformia
- Family: Cerambycidae
- Subfamily: Prioninae
- Tribe: Macrotomini
- Genus: Archodontes; Lameere 1903
- Species: A. melanopus

Binomial name
- Archodontes melanopus (Linnaeus, 1767)

Synonyms
- List (Genus): Paramallus Lameere 1903; (Species): Aplagiognathus cilipes Thomson, 1867; Aplagiognathus melanopus Thomson, 1864; Archodontes cilipes Say 1824; Archodontes simplicicolle (Haldeman 1847); Basitoxus melanopus Lameere, 1903; Cerambyx melanopus Linné, 1767; Mallodon cilipes Haldeman, 1847; Mallodon dasystomus Haldeman, 1847; Mallodon melanopus Melsheimer, 1853; Mallodon simplicicolle Haldeman, 1847; Orthosoma cilipes Haldeman, 1847; Paramallus cilipes Casey, 1912; Paramallus melanopus Casey, 1912; Prionus melanopus Fabricius, 1781; Stenodontes melanopus Herrick, 1935

= Archodontes =

Archodontes melanopus

Genus of beetles

Archodontes is a genus of root-boring beetles in the family Cerambycidae. It is monotypic, being represented by the single species Archodontes melanopus. It is endemic to Central America and the south-eastern United States, and bores the roots of oaks and other hardwoods.

== Description ==
Head short and black. Mandibles short. Antennae dark brown, almost black; shorter than the insect. The thorax broad, rough and black, margined on the posterior and anterior edges; having many small sharp spines on its sides, the two last of which are larger than the rest, and having two tubercles on the upper side. Elytra dark brown, almost black, margined on the sides and suture, with a small spine on each, at the extremities, and extending a little beyond the anus. Abdomen smooth and shining, and of a dark brown colour, nearly black. Sides of the breast hairy. Legs dark brown, almost black, smooth and shining, with three small tibial spurs. Length (including mandibles) 2¼ inches (57 mm).
