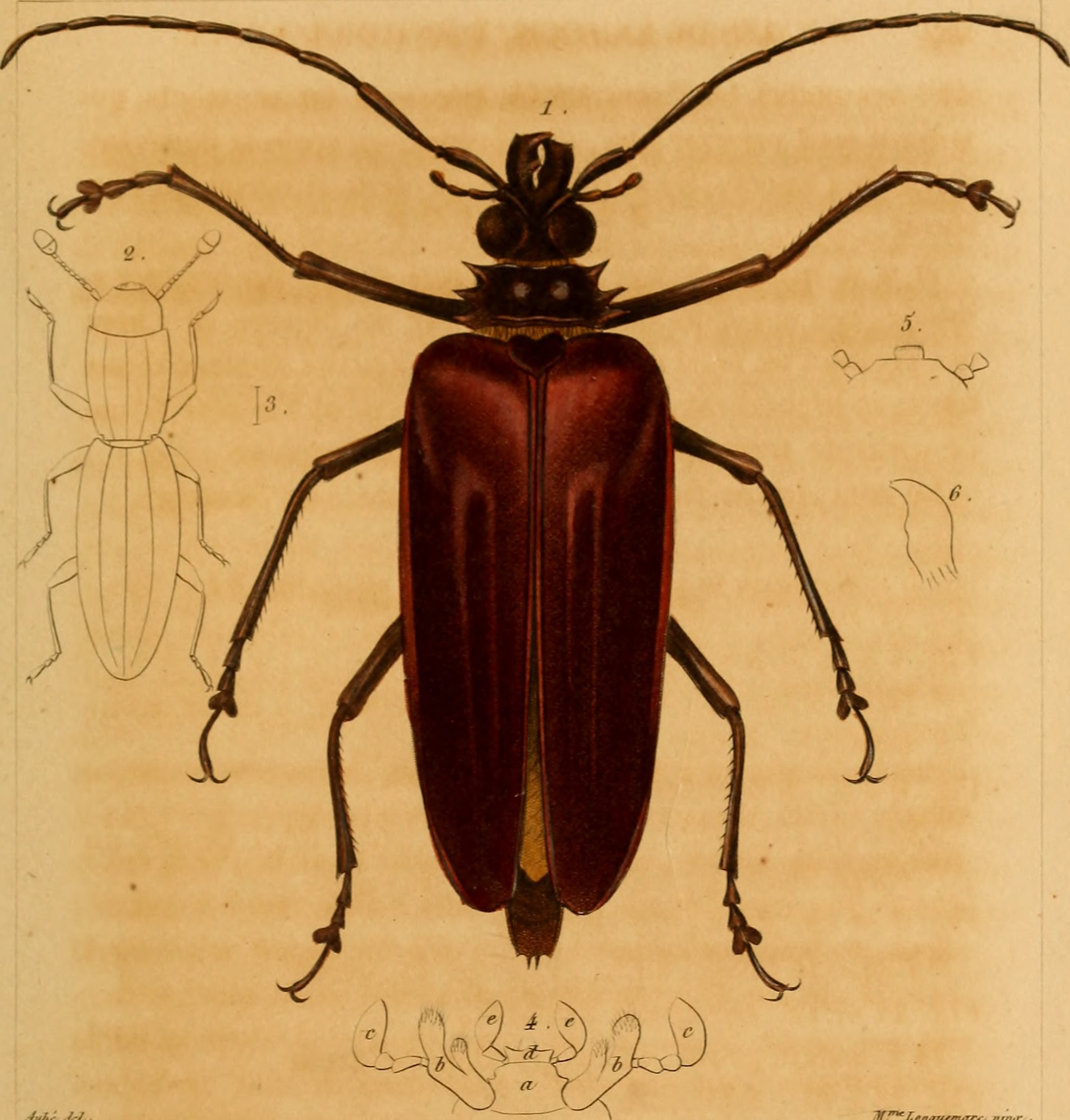
- Braderochus levoiturieri

Scientific classification
- Kingdom: Animalia
- Phylum: Arthropoda
- Clade: Pancrustacea
- Class: Insecta
- Order: Coleoptera
- Suborder: Polyphaga
- Infraorder: Cucujiformia
- Family: Cerambycidae
- Subfamily: Prioninae
- Tribe: Prionini
- Genus: Braderochus; Buquet 1852

Synonyms
- Aulacocerus White 1853

= Braderochus =

Genus of beetles

Braderochus is a genus of beetles in the family Cerambycidae, containing the following species:

- Braderochus dentipes (Chemsak, 1979)
- Braderochus hovorei Santos-Silva & Martins, 2005
- Braderochus jolyi Bleuzen, 1994
- Braderochus levoiturieri (Buquet, 1842)
- Braderochus mundus (White, 1853)
- Braderochus retrospinosus Lameere, 1916
- Braderochus salcedoi Bleuzen, 1994
