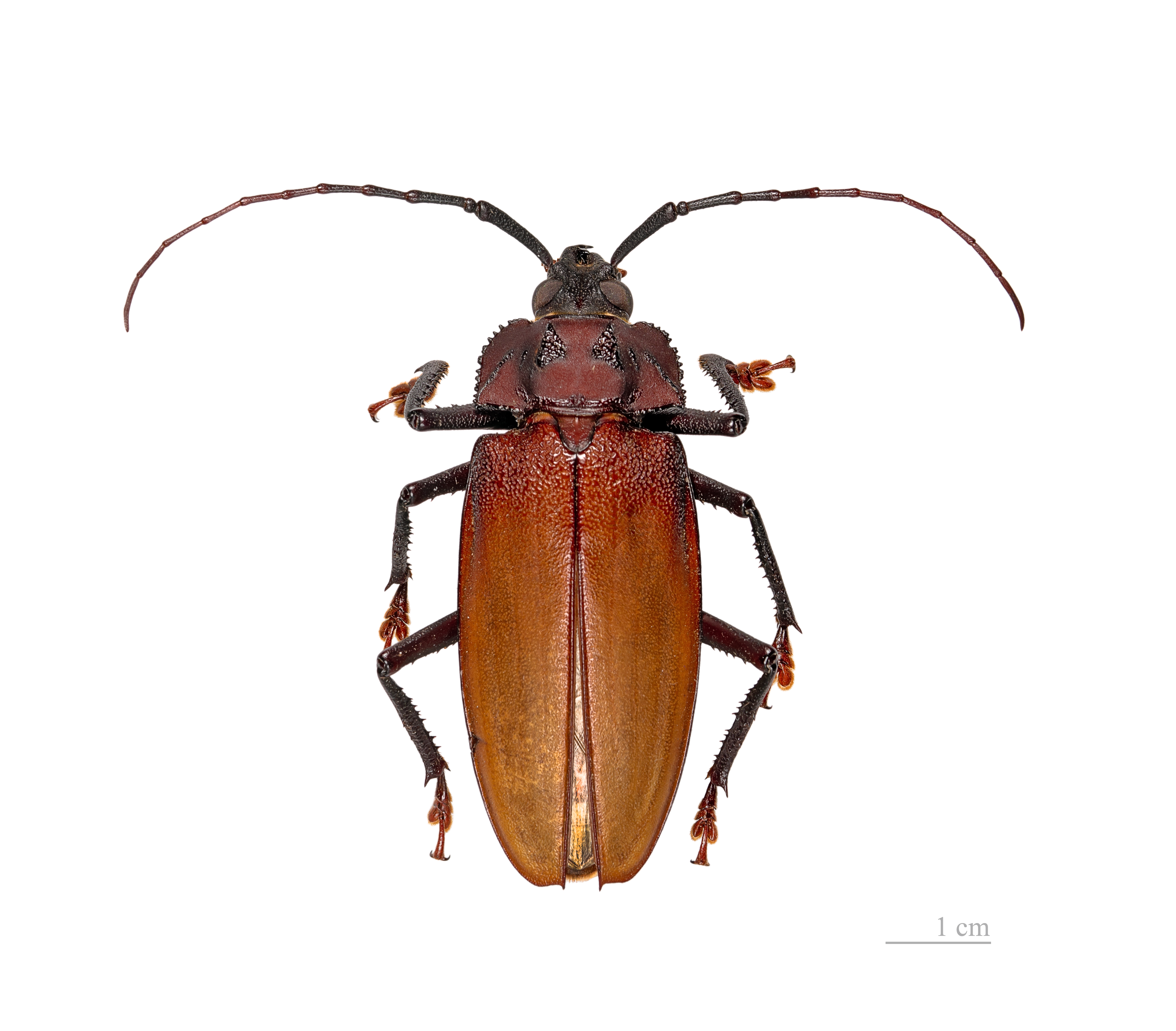

Scientific classification
- Kingdom: Animalia
- Phylum: Arthropoda
- Clade: Pancrustacea
- Class: Insecta
- Order: Coleoptera
- Suborder: Polyphaga
- Infraorder: Cucujiformia
- Family: Cerambycidae
- Subfamily: Prioninae
- Tribe: Macrotomini
- Genus: Ialyssus; Gemminger & Harold, 1872
- Species: I. tuberculatus

Binomial name
- Ialyssus tuberculatus (Olivier, 1975)

Synonyms
- (Genus): Jalyssus Gemminger & Harold, 1872

= Ialyssus =

Ialyssus tuberculatus

Genus of beetles

Ialyssus is a genus of beetles in the family Cerambycidae. It is monotypic, being represented by the single species Ialyssus tuberculatus.
