= Spiloprionus =

Spiloprionus sericeomaculatus

Scientific classification
- Kingdom: Animalia
- Phylum: Arthropoda
- Clade: Pancrustacea
- Class: Insecta
- Order: Coleoptera
- Suborder: Polyphaga
- Infraorder: Cucujiformia
- Family: Cerambycidae
- Subfamily: Prioninae
- Tribe: Callipogonini
- Genus: Spiloprionus; Aurivillius, 1897
- Species: S. sericeomaculatus

Binomial name
- Spiloprionus sericeomaculatus Aurivillius, 1897

Genus of beetles

Spiloprionus is a genus of beetles in the family Cerambycidae. It is monotypic, being represented by the single species Spiloprionus sericeomaculatus.
