= Chariea =

Scientific classification
- Kingdom: Animalia
- Phylum: Arthropoda
- Clade: Pancrustacea
- Class: Insecta
- Order: Coleoptera
- Suborder: Polyphaga
- Infraorder: Cucujiformia
- Family: Cerambycidae
- Subfamily: Prioninae
- Tribe: Anacolini
- Genus: Chariea; Audinet-Serville, 1832

Genus of beetles

Chariea is a genus of beetles in the family Cerambycidae, containing the following species:

- Chariea birai Monné & Monné, 2015
- Chariea cyanea Audinet-Serville, 1832
- Chariea lepesmei Tippmann, 1956
- Chariea longispina Galileo & Martins, 1990
