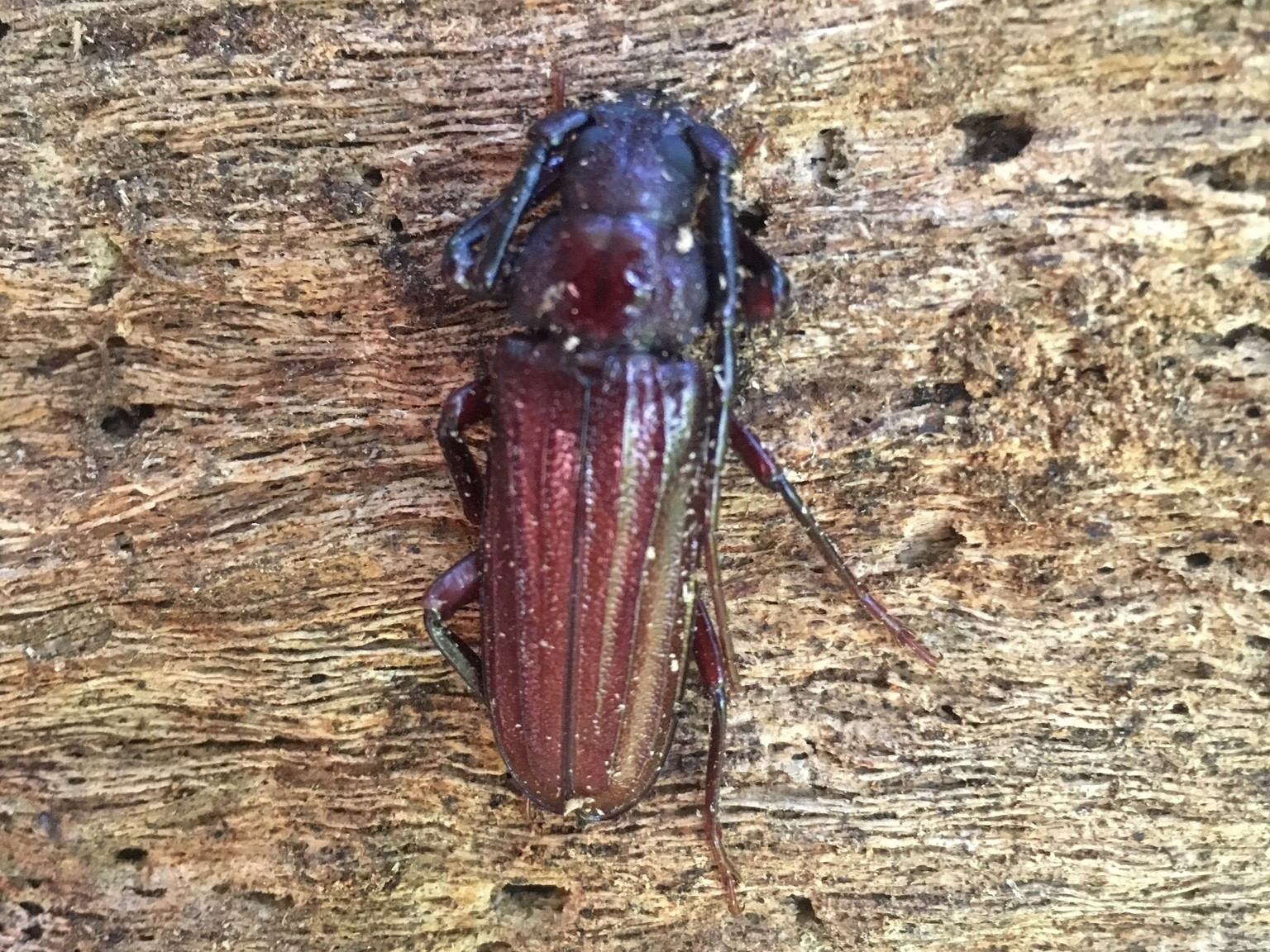
- Seticeros granulocephalus

Scientific classification
- Kingdom: Animalia
- Phylum: Arthropoda
- Clade: Pancrustacea
- Class: Insecta
- Order: Coleoptera
- Suborder: Polyphaga
- Infraorder: Cucujiformia
- Family: Cerambycidae
- Subfamily: Prioninae
- Tribe: Callipogonini
- Genus: Seticeros; Perger & Santos-Silva, 2010

= Seticeros =

Genus of beetles

Seticeros is a genus of beetles in the longhorn beetle family Cerambycidae.

The following species are recognised in the genus Seticeros:

- Seticeros aquilus (Thomson, 1865)
- Seticeros convergens Vlasak & Santos-Silva, 2021
- Seticeros granulocephalus Ramirez, Esteban & Santos-Silva, 2011
- Seticeros tunupai Perger & Santos-Silva, 2010
