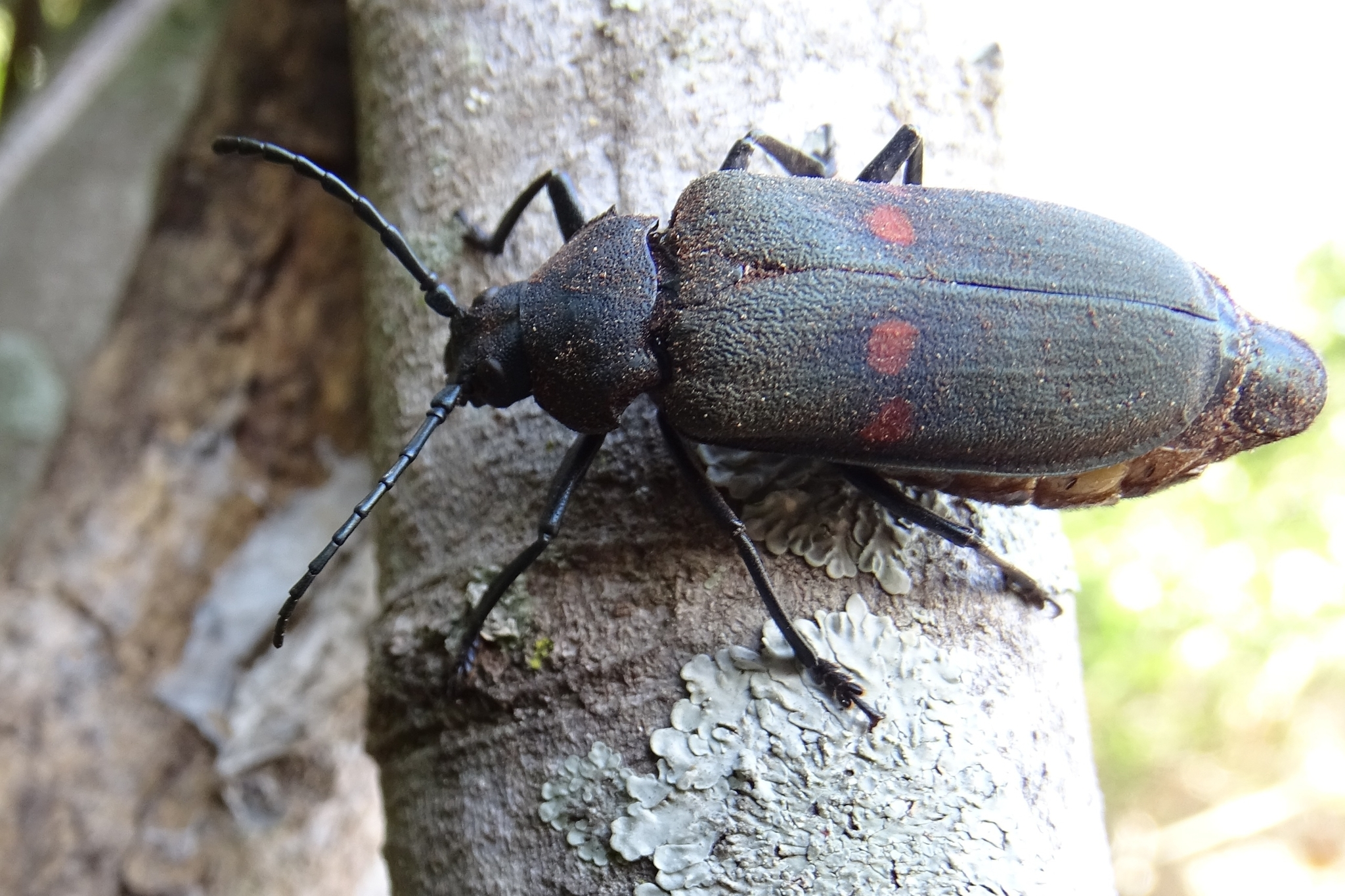
- Poekilosoma ornatum

Scientific classification
- Kingdom: Animalia
- Phylum: Arthropoda
- Clade: Pancrustacea
- Class: Insecta
- Order: Coleoptera
- Suborder: Polyphaga
- Infraorder: Cucujiformia
- Family: Cerambycidae
- Subfamily: Prioninae
- Tribe: Anacolini
- Genus: Poekilosoma; Audinet-Serville, 1832

Synonyms
- Ceroctenus Audinet-Serville, 1832; Poecilosoma Laporte, 1840

= Poekilosoma =

Genus of beetles

Poekilosoma is a genus of beetles in the family Cerambycidae, containing the following species:

- Poekilosoma carinatipenne Lane, 1941
- Poekilosoma ornatum (Dalman, 1823)
