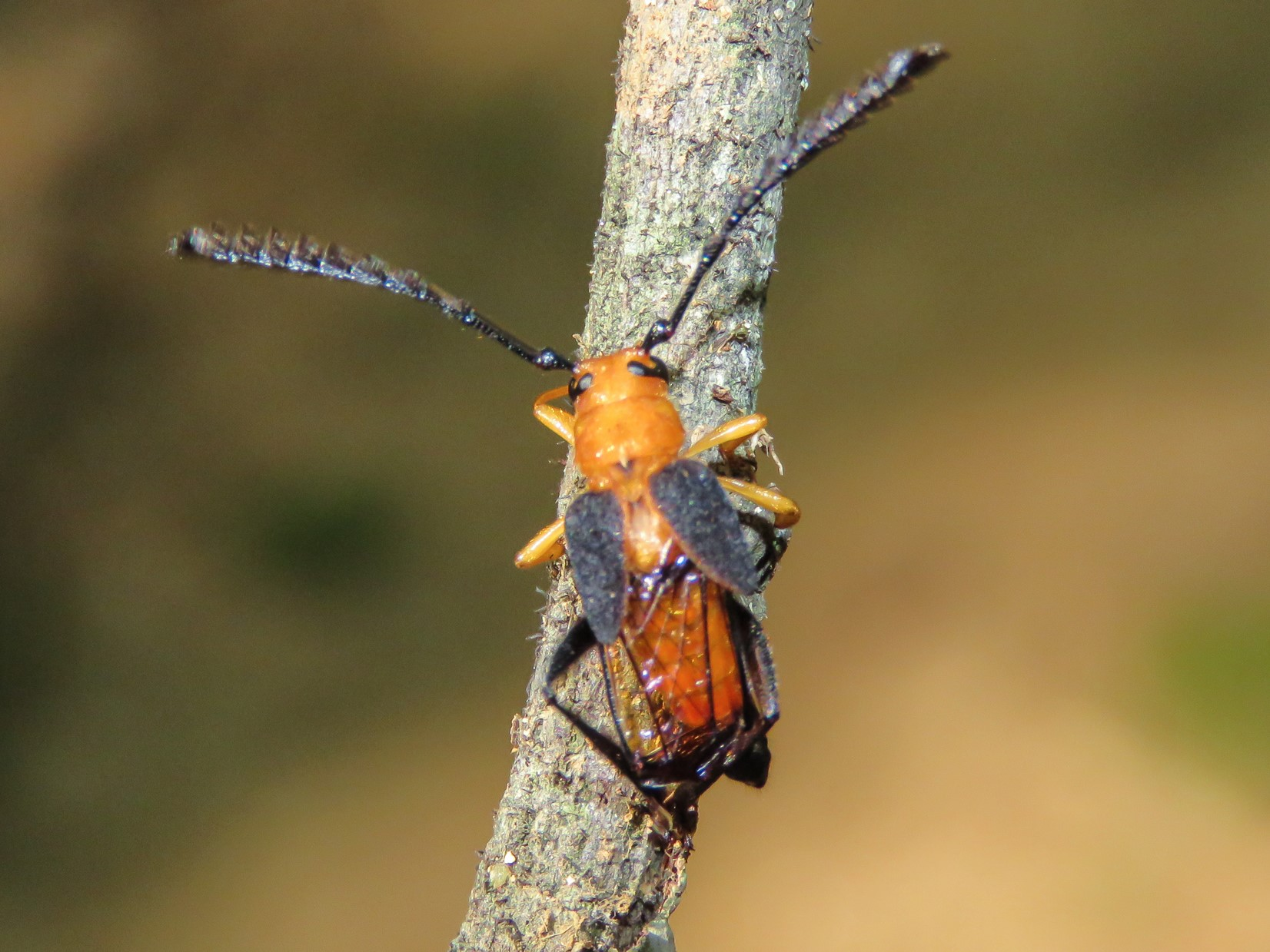
- Myzomorphus quadripunctatus

Scientific classification
- Kingdom: Animalia
- Phylum: Arthropoda
- Clade: Pancrustacea
- Class: Insecta
- Order: Coleoptera
- Suborder: Polyphaga
- Infraorder: Cucujiformia
- Family: Cerambycidae
- Subfamily: Prioninae
- Tribe: Anacolini
- Genus: Myzomorphus; Sallé, 1850

Synonyms
- Udeteromorphus Tippmann 1960

= Myzomorphus =

Genus of beetles

Myzomorphus is a genus of beetles in the family Cerambycidae, containing the following species:

- Myzomorphus amabilis (Tippmann, 1960)
- Myzomorphus birai Bezark, Galileo & Santos-Silva 2016
- Myzomorphus flavipes Galileo, 1987
- Myzomorphus gounellei Lameere, 1912
- Myzomorphus herteli Gilmour, 1960
- Myzomorphus poultoni Lameere, 1912
- Myzomorphus quadripunctatus (Gray in Griffith, 1831)
- Myzomorphus scutellatus Sallé, 1849
- Myzomorphus sparsimflambellatus Zajciw, 1963
