= Neoma corrosa =

Scientific classification
- Kingdom: Animalia
- Phylum: Arthropoda
- Clade: Pancrustacea
- Class: Insecta
- Order: Coleoptera
- Suborder: Polyphaga
- Infraorder: Cucujiformia
- Family: Cerambycidae
- Subfamily: Prioninae
- Tribe: Macrotomini
- Genus: Neoma; Santos-Silva et al., 2011
- Species: N. corrosa

Binomial name
- Neoma corrosa (Bates, 1879)

Genus of beetles

Neoma corrosa is a species of beetle in the family Cerambycidae, the only species in the genus Neoma.
