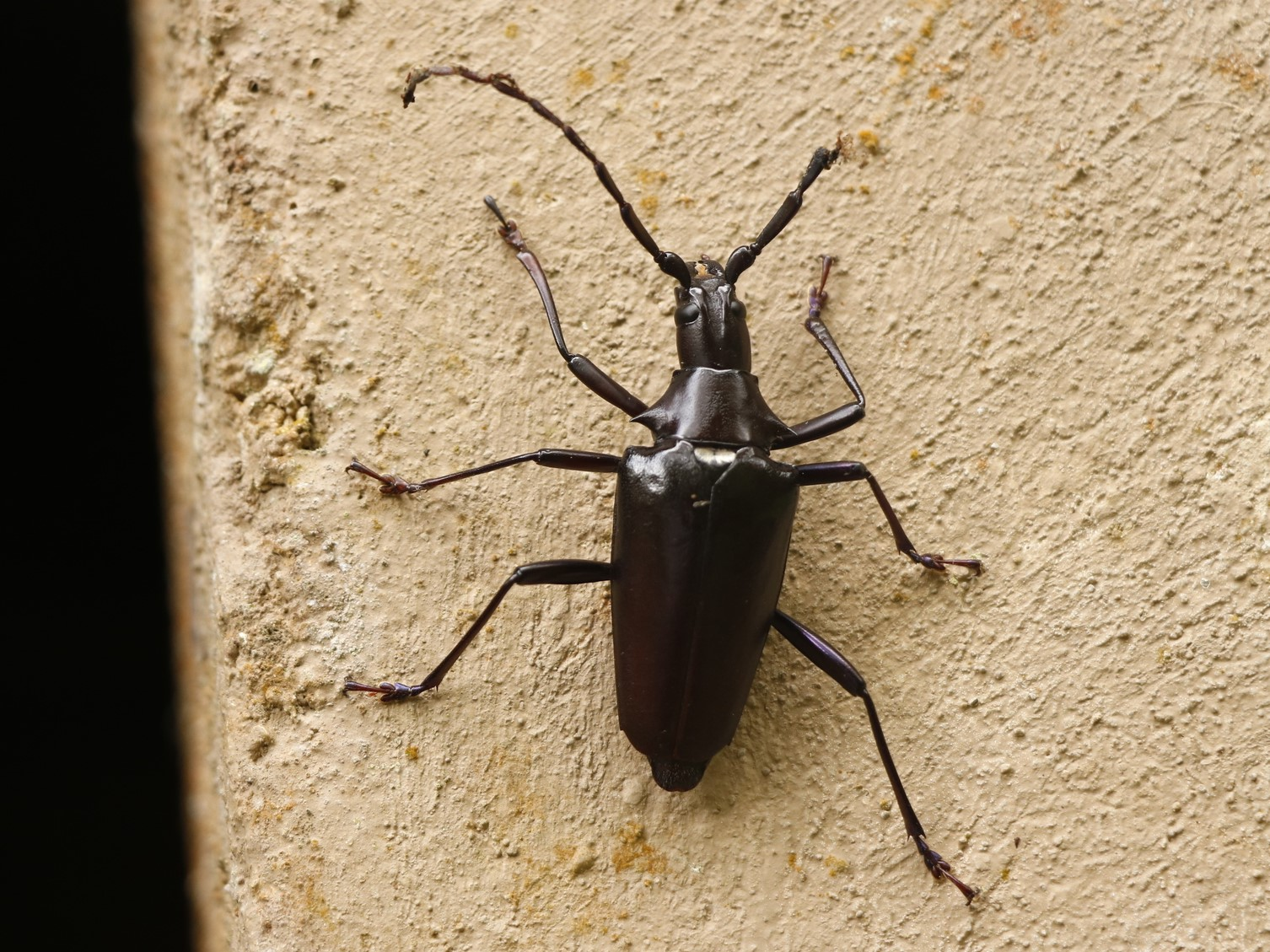

Scientific classification
- Kingdom: Animalia
- Phylum: Arthropoda
- Clade: Pancrustacea
- Class: Insecta
- Order: Coleoptera
- Suborder: Polyphaga
- Infraorder: Cucujiformia
- Family: Cerambycidae
- Subfamily: Prioninae
- Tribe: Mallaspini
- Genus: Insuetaspis; Galileo & Martins, 1992
- Species: I. paradoxus

Binomial name
- Insuetaspis paradoxus (Bates, 1869)

= Insuetaspis =

Insuetaspis paradoxus

Genus of beetles

Insuetaspis is a genus of beetles in the family Cerambycidae. It is monotypic, being represented by the single species Insuetaspis paradoxus.
