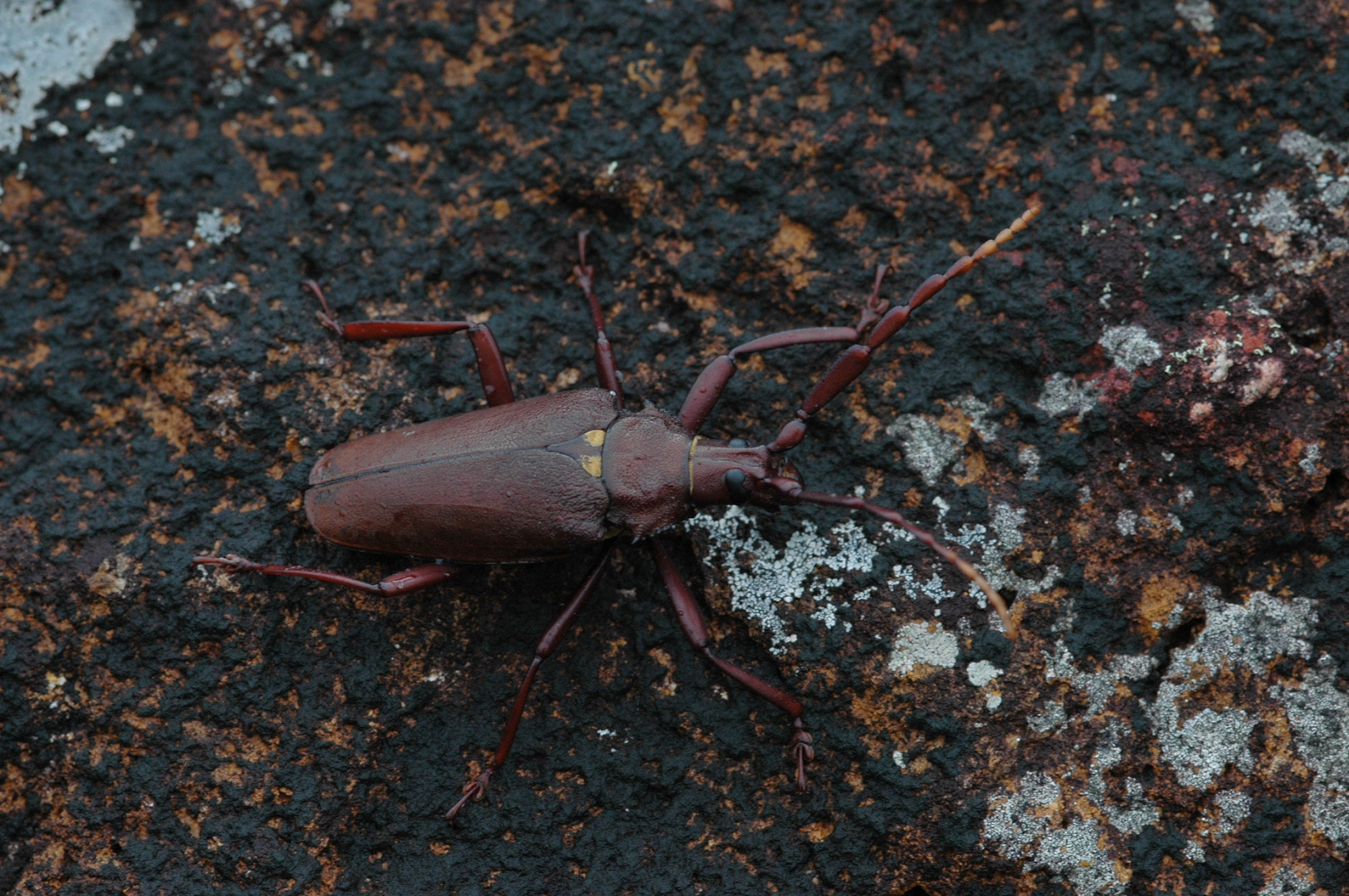
- Praemallaspis rhombodera

Scientific classification
- Kingdom: Animalia
- Phylum: Arthropoda
- Clade: Pancrustacea
- Class: Insecta
- Order: Coleoptera
- Suborder: Polyphaga
- Infraorder: Cucujiformia
- Family: Cerambycidae
- Subfamily: Prioninae
- Tribe: Mallaspini
- Genus: Praemallaspis; Galileo & Martins, 1992

= Praemallaspis =

Genus of beetles

Praemallaspis is a genus of beetles in the family Cerambycidae, containing the following species:

- Praemallaspis argodi (Lameere, 1909)
- Praemallaspis batesi (Lameere, 1909)
- Praemallaspis inca Galileo & Martins, 1992
- Praemallaspis leucaspis (Guérin-Méneville, 1844)
- Praemallaspis rhombodera (Bates, 1879)
- Praemallaspis xanthaspis (Guérin-Méneville, 1844)
