= Protorma =

Protorma costifer

Scientific classification
- Kingdom: Animalia
- Phylum: Arthropoda
- Clade: Pancrustacea
- Class: Insecta
- Order: Coleoptera
- Suborder: Polyphaga
- Infraorder: Cucujiformia
- Family: Cerambycidae
- Subfamily: Prioninae
- Tribe: Mallodonini
- Genus: Protorma; Waterhouse, 1880
- Species: P. costifer

Binomial name
- Protorma costifer Thomson, 1877

Synonyms
- Protorma recurvatum Williams, 1929; Protorma scabrosa Waterhouse, 1880

Genus of beetles

Protorma is a genus of beetles in the family Cerambycidae. It is monotypic, being represented by the single species Protorma costifer.
