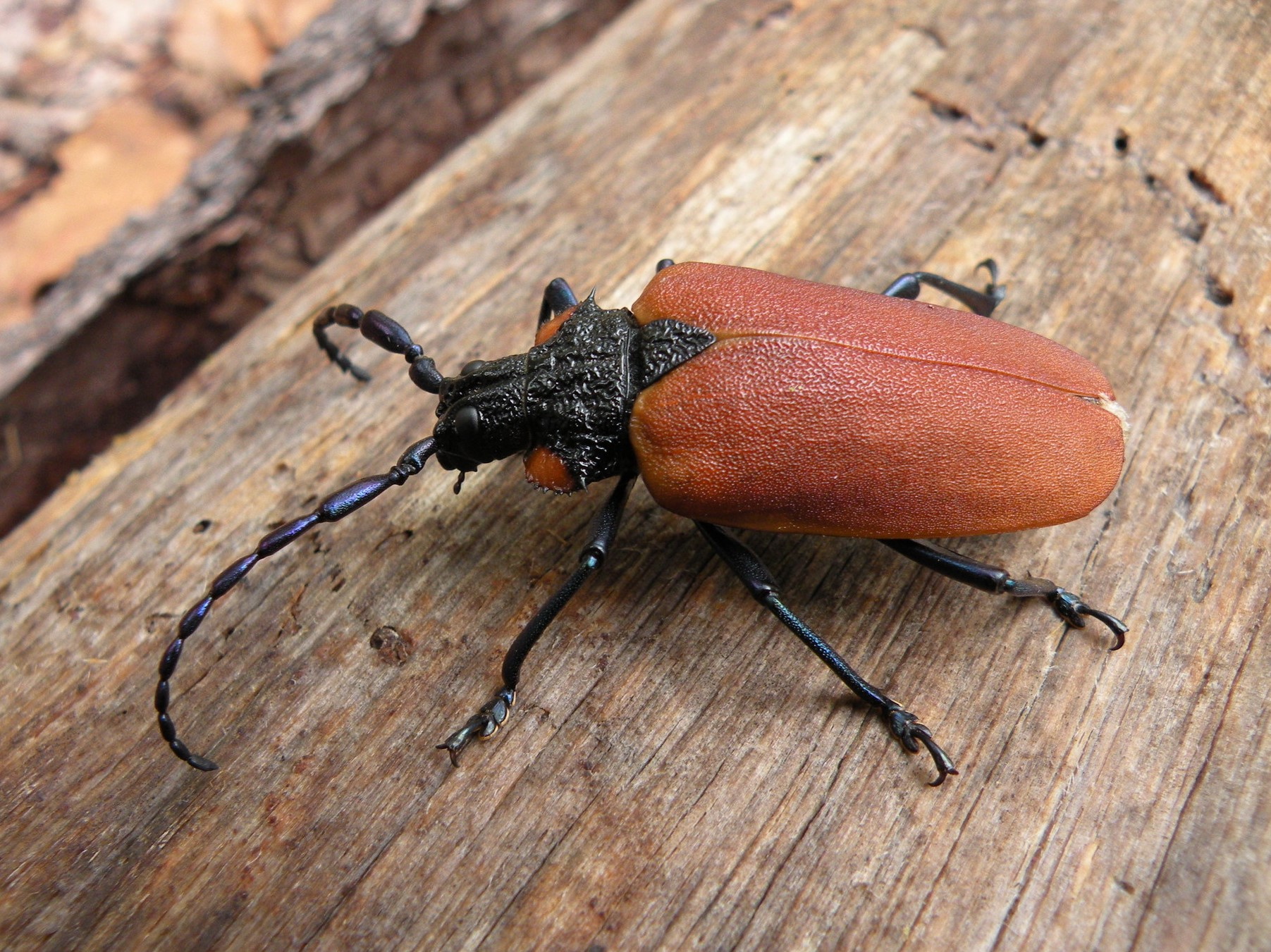

Scientific classification
- Kingdom: Animalia
- Phylum: Arthropoda
- Clade: Pancrustacea
- Class: Insecta
- Order: Coleoptera
- Suborder: Polyphaga
- Infraorder: Cucujiformia
- Family: Cerambycidae
- Subfamily: Prioninae
- Tribe: Mallaspini
- Genus: Oropyrodes; Galileo & Martins, 1992
- Species: O. maculicollis

Binomial name
- Oropyrodes maculicollis (Bates, 1891)

= Oropyrodes =

Oropyrodes maculicollis

Genus of beetles

Oropyrodes is a genus of beetles in the family Cerambycidae. It is monotypic, being represented by the single species Oropyrodes maculicollis.
