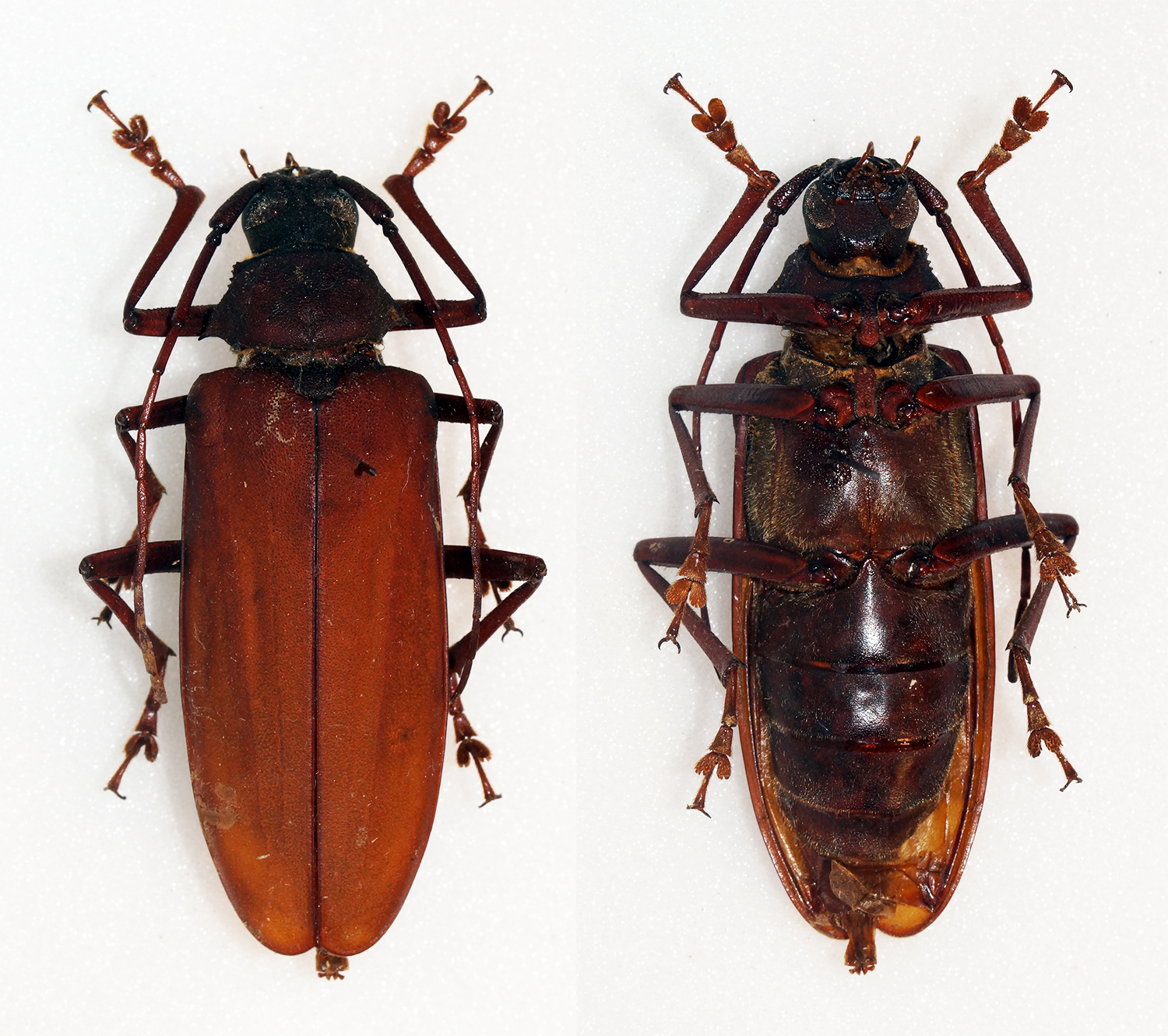
- Strongylaspis bullatus

Scientific classification
- Domain: Eukaryota
- Kingdom: Animalia
- Phylum: Arthropoda
- Class: Insecta
- Order: Coleoptera
- Suborder: Polyphaga
- Infraorder: Cucujiformia
- Family: Cerambycidae
- Subfamily: Prioninae
- Tribe: Macrotomini
- Genus: Strongylaspis; Thomson, 1860

= Strongylaspis =

Genus of beetles

Strongylaspis is a genus of beetles in the longhorn beetle family, Cerambycidae.

The following species are recocognised in the genus Strongylaspis:

- Strongylaspis antonkozlovi Galileo & Santos-Silva, 2018
- Strongylaspis aureus Monné & Santos-Silva, 2003
- Strongylaspis batesi Lameere, 1903
- Strongylaspis bolivianus Monné & Santos-Silva, 2003
- Strongylaspis bullatus Bates, 1872
- Strongylaspis championi Bates, 1884
- Strongylaspis christianae Monné & Santos-Silva, 2003
- Strongylaspis corticarius (Erichson in Schomburg, 1848)
- Strongylaspis dohrni Lameere, 1903
- Strongylaspis fryi Lameere, 1912
- Strongylaspis graniger Bates, 1884
- Strongylaspis hirticollis Tippmann, 1953
- Strongylaspis kraepelini Lameere, 1903
- Strongylaspis macrotomoides Tippmann, 1953
- Strongylaspis migueli Monné & Santos-Silva, 2003
- Strongylaspis sericans Tippmann, 1953
- Strongylaspis sericeus Zajciw, 1970
