= Flabellomorphus =

Flabellomorphus longus

Scientific classification
- Kingdom: Animalia
- Phylum: Arthropoda
- Clade: Pancrustacea
- Class: Insecta
- Order: Coleoptera
- Suborder: Polyphaga
- Infraorder: Cucujiformia
- Family: Cerambycidae
- Subfamily: Prioninae
- Tribe: Anacolini
- Genus: Flabellomorphus; Galileo & Martins, 1990
- Species: F. longus

Binomial name
- Flabellomorphus longus Galileo & Martins, 1990

Genus of beetles

Flabellomorphus is a genus of beetles in the family Cerambycidae. It is monotypic, being represented by the single species Flabellomorphus longus.
