= Hovorelus =

Scientific classification
- Kingdom: Animalia
- Phylum: Arthropoda
- Clade: Pancrustacea
- Class: Insecta
- Order: Coleoptera
- Suborder: Polyphaga
- Infraorder: Cucujiformia
- Family: Cerambycidae
- Subfamily: Prioninae
- Tribe: Anacolini
- Genus: Hovorelus; Galileo & Monne, 2003

Genus of beetles

Hovorelus is a genus of beetles in the family Cerambycidae, containing the following species:

- Hovorelus adiectus Galileo & Martins, 2010
- Hovorelus splendidus Galileo & Monne, 2003
