= Ucai =

Scientific classification
- Domain: Eukaryota
- Kingdom: Animalia
- Phylum: Arthropoda
- Class: Insecta
- Order: Coleoptera
- Suborder: Polyphaga
- Infraorder: Cucujiformia
- Family: Cerambycidae
- Subfamily: Prioninae
- Tribe: Anacolini
- Genus: Ucai; Galileo & Martins, 2009

Species
- 2

Genus of beetles

Ucai is a genus of beetles in the longhorn beetle family, Cerambycidae. It was erected in 2009 with the description of a new species from Brazil. A second species was described in 2014.

== Species ==
The following species are recognised in the genus Ucai:

- Ucai letiziae Santos-Silva, 2014
- Ucai nascimentoi Galileo and Martins, 2009
