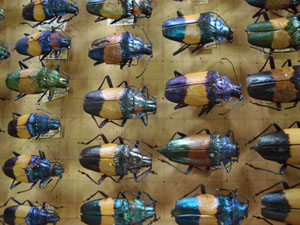
- Charmallaspis pulcherrima

Scientific classification
- Kingdom: Animalia
- Phylum: Arthropoda
- Clade: Pancrustacea
- Class: Insecta
- Order: Coleoptera
- Suborder: Polyphaga
- Infraorder: Cucujiformia
- Family: Cerambycidae
- Subfamily: Prioninae
- Tribe: Mallaspini
- Genus: Charmallaspis; Galileo & Martins, 1992

= Charmallaspis =

Genus of beetles

Charmallaspis is a genus of beetles in the family Cerambycidae, containing the following species:

- Charmallaspis pulcherrima (Perty, 1832)
- Charmallaspis smithiana White, 1850
