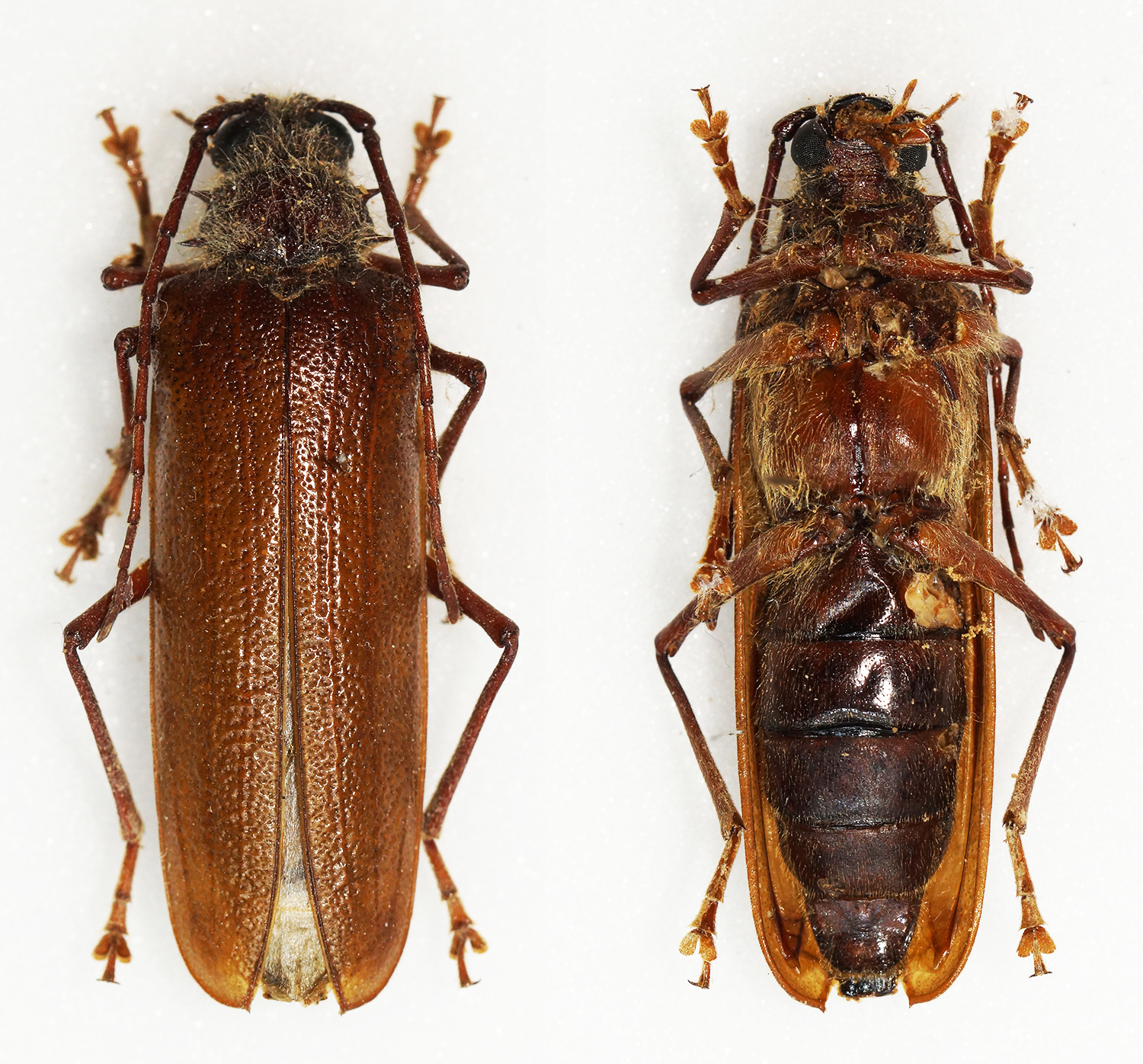
- Trichoderes rugosus

Scientific classification
- Domain: Eukaryota
- Kingdom: Animalia
- Phylum: Arthropoda
- Class: Insecta
- Order: Coleoptera
- Suborder: Polyphaga
- Infraorder: Cucujiformia
- Family: Cerambycidae
- Subfamily: Prioninae
- Tribe: Meroscelisini
- Genus: Trichoderes; Chevrolat 1843

= Trichoderes =

Genus of beetles

Trichoderes is a genus of beetles in the family Cerambycidae, containing the following species:

- Trichoderes cylindroidus (Bates, 1884)
- Trichoderes pini Chevrolat, 1843
- Trichoderes rugosus Bates, 1884
