= Stictosomus =

Stictosomus semicostatus

Scientific classification
- Kingdom: Animalia
- Phylum: Arthropoda
- Clade: Pancrustacea
- Class: Insecta
- Order: Coleoptera
- Suborder: Polyphaga
- Infraorder: Cucujiformia
- Family: Cerambycidae
- Subfamily: Prioninae
- Tribe: Callipogonini
- Genus: Stictosomus; Audinet-Serville, 1832
- Species: S. semicostatus

Binomial name
- Stictosomus semicostatus Audinet-Serville, 1832

Genus of beetles

Stictosomus is a genus of beetles in the family Cerambycidae. It is monotypic, being represented by the single species Stictosomus semicostatus.
