= Hephialtes =

Scientific classification
- Kingdom: Animalia
- Phylum: Arthropoda
- Clade: Pancrustacea
- Class: Insecta
- Order: Coleoptera
- Suborder: Polyphaga
- Infraorder: Cucujiformia
- Family: Cerambycidae
- Subfamily: Prioninae
- Tribe: Callipogonini
- Genus: Hephialtes; Thomson, 1864

Species
- Hephialtes mourei Santos-Silva, 2004; Hephialtes ruber (Thunberg, 1822); Hephialtes touroulti Delahaye, 2020

Genus of beetles

Hephialtes is a genus of beetles in the family Cerambycidae.
