= Xanthonicias =

Xanthonicias prostrata

Scientific classification
- Kingdom: Animalia
- Phylum: Arthropoda
- Clade: Pancrustacea
- Class: Insecta
- Order: Coleoptera
- Suborder: Polyphaga
- Infraorder: Cucujiformia
- Family: Cerambycidae
- Subfamily: Prioninae
- Tribe: Anacolini
- Genus: Xanthonicias; Galileo, 1987
- Species: X. prostrata

Binomial name
- Xanthonicias prostrata Galileo, 1987

Genus of beetles

Xanthonicias is a genus of beetles in the family Cerambycidae. It is monotypic, being represented by the single species Xanthonicias prostrata.
