= Allaiocerus =

Scientific classification
- Kingdom: Animalia
- Phylum: Arthropoda
- Clade: Pancrustacea
- Class: Insecta
- Order: Coleoptera
- Suborder: Polyphaga
- Infraorder: Cucujiformia
- Family: Cerambycidae
- Subfamily: Prioninae
- Tribe: Anacolini
- Genus: Allaiocerus; Galileo, 1987
- Species: A. metallicus

Binomial name
- Allaiocerus metallicus Galileo, 1987

Genus of beetles

Allaiocerus is a genus of beetles in the family Cerambycidae. It is monotypic, being represented by the single species Allaiocerus metallicus.
