= Curitiba brunni =

Scientific classification
- Kingdom: Animalia
- Phylum: Arthropoda
- Clade: Pancrustacea
- Class: Insecta
- Order: Coleoptera
- Suborder: Polyphaga
- Infraorder: Cucujiformia
- Family: Cerambycidae
- Subfamily: Prioninae
- Tribe: Macrotomini
- Genus: Curitiba; Lameere, 1903
- Species: C. brunni

Binomial name
- Curitiba brunni Lameere, 1903

Synonyms
- Strongylaspis scheerpeltzi Tippmann, 1953

Genus of beetles

Curitiba brunni is a species of beetle in the family Cerambycidae, the only species in the genus Curitiba.
