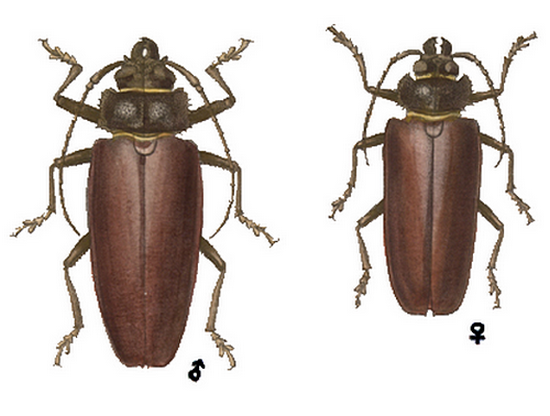

Scientific classification
- Kingdom: Animalia
- Phylum: Arthropoda
- Clade: Pancrustacea
- Class: Insecta
- Order: Coleoptera
- Suborder: Polyphaga
- Infraorder: Cucujiformia
- Family: Cerambycidae
- Subfamily: Prioninae
- Tribe: Macrotomini
- Genus: Mallodonopsis; Thomson, 1860
- Species: M. mexicanus

Binomial name
- Mallodonopsis mexicanus Thomson, 1861

Synonyms
- Aplagiognathus serratus (Thomson, 1860); Mallodonopsis serrata Thomson, 1860

= Mallodonopsis =

Mallodonopsis mexicanus

Genus of beetles

Mallodonopsis is a genus of beetles in the family Cerambycidae. It is monotypic, being represented by the single species Mallodonopsis mexicanus.
