= Rhodocharis =

Rhodocharis anacoloides

Scientific classification
- Kingdom: Animalia
- Phylum: Arthropoda
- Clade: Pancrustacea
- Class: Insecta
- Order: Coleoptera
- Suborder: Polyphaga
- Infraorder: Cucujiformia
- Family: Cerambycidae
- Subfamily: Prioninae
- Tribe: Anacolini
- Genus: Rhodocharis; Lacordaire, 1869
- Species: R. anacoloides

Binomial name
- Rhodocharis anacoloides Lacordaire, 1869

Genus of beetles

Rhodocharis is a genus of beetles in the family Cerambycidae. It is monotypic, being represented by the single species Rhodocharis anacoloides.
