= Galileoana =

Galileoana opaca

Scientific classification
- Kingdom: Animalia
- Phylum: Arthropoda
- Clade: Pancrustacea
- Class: Insecta
- Order: Coleoptera
- Suborder: Polyphaga
- Infraorder: Cucujiformia
- Family: Cerambycidae
- Subfamily: Prioninae
- Tribe: Anacolini
- Genus: Galileoana; Chemsak, 1998
- Species: G. opaca

Binomial name
- Galileoana opaca Chemsak, 1998

Genus of beetles

Galileoana is a genus of beetles in the family Cerambycidae. It is monotypic, being represented by the single species Galileoana opaca. It is endemic to Tamaulipas, Mexico.
