= Biribellus =

Scientific classification
- Kingdom: Animalia
- Phylum: Arthropoda
- Clade: Pancrustacea
- Class: Insecta
- Order: Coleoptera
- Suborder: Polyphaga
- Infraorder: Cucujiformia
- Family: Cerambycidae
- Subfamily: Prioninae
- Tribe: Anacolini
- Genus: Biribellus; Galileo 1987

Genus of beetles

Biribellus is a genus of beetles in the family Cerambycidae, containing the following species:

- Biribellus huedepohli (Galileo, 1987)
- Biribellus isabelae Santos-Silva, Hernandez & Galileo 2018
- Biribellus martinsi Galileo, 1987
- Biribellus punctatus Galileo, 1987
