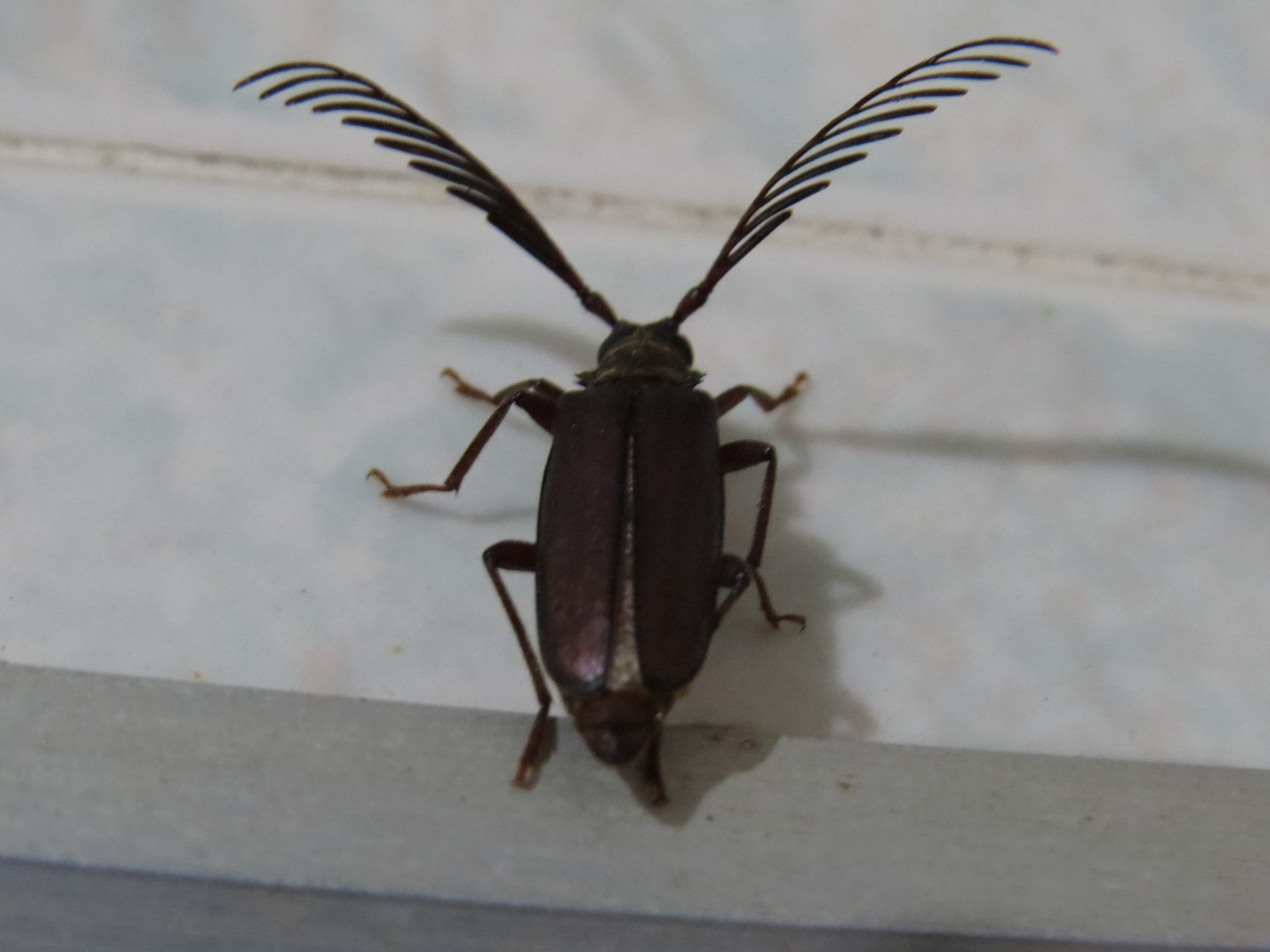

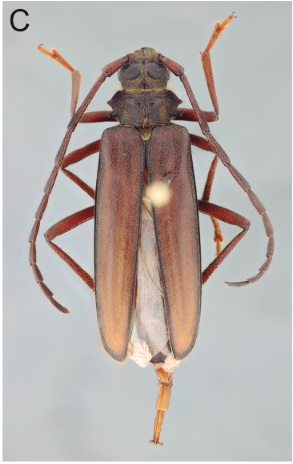

Scientific classification
- Kingdom: Animalia
- Phylum: Arthropoda
- Clade: Pancrustacea
- Class: Insecta
- Order: Coleoptera
- Suborder: Polyphaga
- Infraorder: Cucujiformia
- Family: Cerambycidae
- Subfamily: Prioninae
- Tribe: Meroscelisini
- Genus: Polyoza; Audinet-Serville, 1832
- Species: P. lacordairei

Binomial name
- Polyoza lacordairei Audinet-Serville, 1832

= Polyoza =

Polyoza lacordairei

Genus of beetles

Polyoza is a genus of beetles in the family Cerambycidae. It is monotypic, being represented by the single species Polyoza lacordairei. It is found in Brazil (Goiás, Bahia, Minas Gerais, Espirito Santo, Rio de Janeiro, São Paulo, Paraná, Santa Catarina, Rio Grande do Sul), Paraguay, Argentina and Uruguay.
