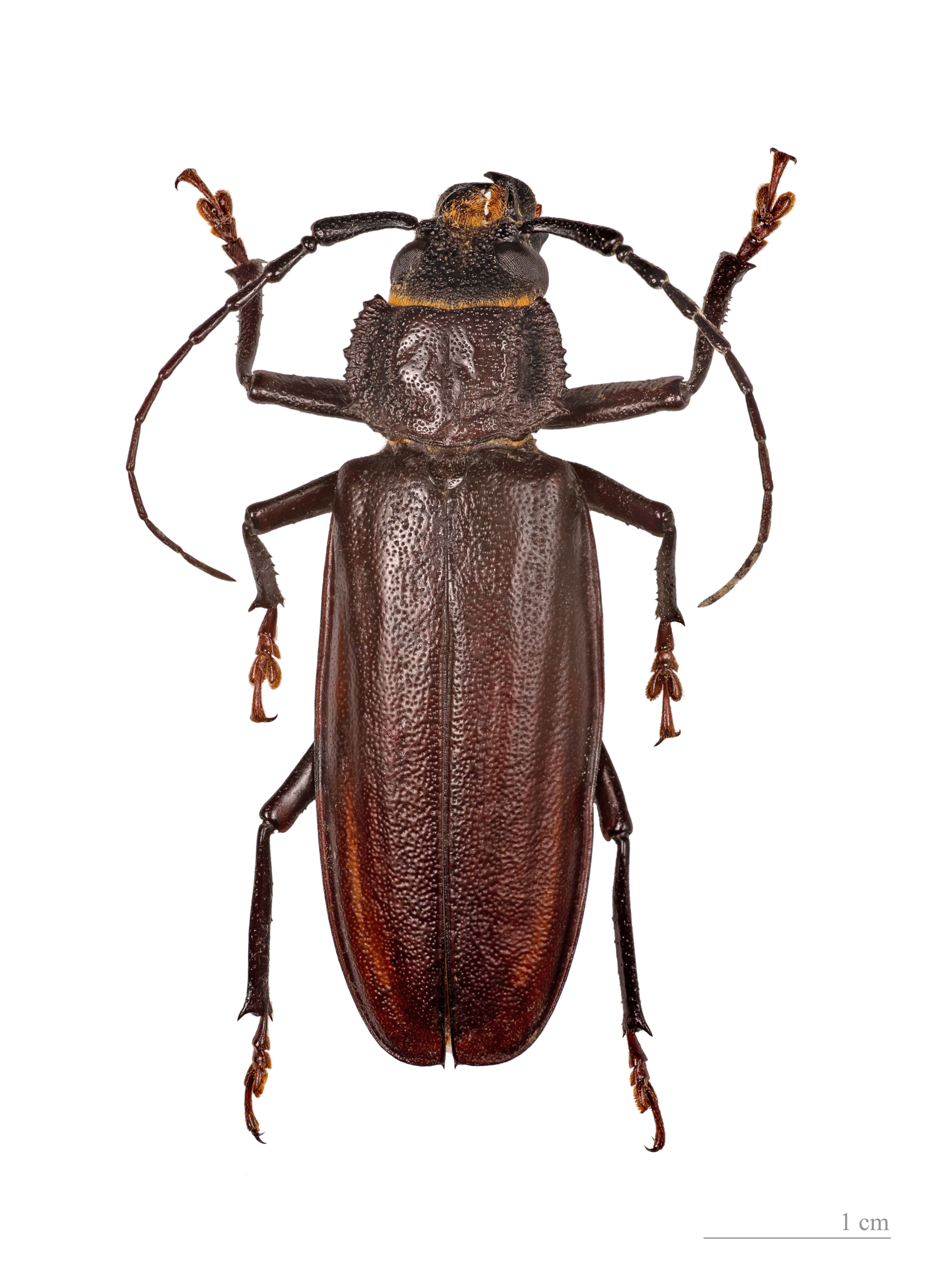
- Museum specimen

Scientific classification
- Kingdom: Animalia
- Phylum: Arthropoda
- Clade: Pancrustacea
- Class: Insecta
- Order: Coleoptera
- Suborder: Polyphaga
- Infraorder: Cucujiformia
- Family: Cerambycidae
- Subfamily: Prioninae
- Tribe: Mallodonini
- Genus: Physopleurus; Lacordaire, 1869

Synonyms
- Basitoxus (Parabasitoxus) Fragoso & Monné, 1995

= Physopleurus =

Genus of beetles

Physopleurus is a genus of beetles in the family Cerambycidae, containing the following species:

- Physopleurus amazonicus Fragoso & Monné, 1995
- Physopleurus antonkozlovi Santos-Silva & Botero, 2016
- Physopleurus crassidens (Bates, 1869)
- Physopleurus dohrnii Lacordaire, 1869
- Physopleurus erikae Santos-Silva & Martins, 2009
- Physopleurus exiguus Santos-Silva & Martins, 2003
- Physopleurus longiscapus Lameere, 1912
- Physopleurus maillei Audinet-Serville, 1832
- Physopleurus rafaeli Santos-Silva, 2006
- Physopleurus rugosus Gahan, 1894
- Physopleurus tritomicros Lameere, 1912
- Physopleurus ubirajarai Delahaye & Tavakilian, 2015
- Physopleurus villardi (Lameere, 1902)
