= Parastrongylaspis =

Scientific classification
- Kingdom: Animalia
- Phylum: Arthropoda
- Clade: Pancrustacea
- Class: Insecta
- Order: Coleoptera
- Suborder: Polyphaga
- Infraorder: Cucujiformia
- Family: Cerambycidae
- Subfamily: Prioninae
- Tribe: Macrotomini
- Genus: Parastrongylaspis; Giesbert, 1987

Genus of beetles

Parastrongylaspis is a genus of beetles in the family Cerambycidae, containing the following species:

- Parastrongylaspis linsleyi Giesbert, 1987
- Parastrongylaspis thomasi Giesbert, 1992
