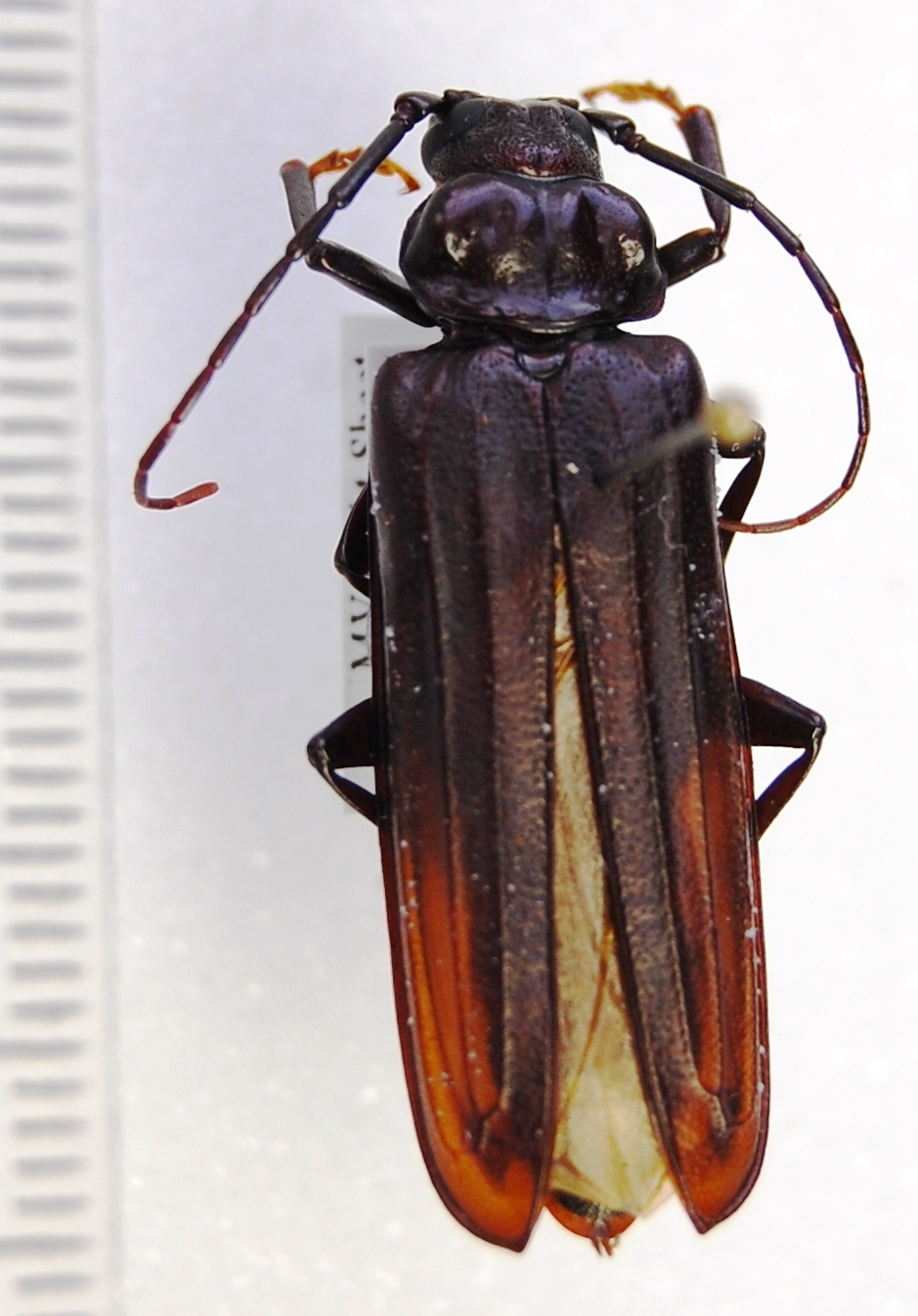
- Chorenta reticulatus

Scientific classification
- Kingdom: Animalia
- Phylum: Arthropoda
- Clade: Pancrustacea
- Class: Insecta
- Order: Coleoptera
- Suborder: Polyphaga
- Infraorder: Cucujiformia
- Family: Cerambycidae
- Subfamily: Prioninae
- Tribe: Callipogonini
- Genus: Chorenta; Gistel, 1848

Synonyms
- Anacanthus Audinet-Serville, 1832

= Chorenta =

Genus of beetles

Chorenta is a genus of beetles in the family Cerambycidae, containing the following species:

- Chorenta biramiguelus (Santos-Silva, 2004)
- Chorenta espiritosantensis (Seabra, 1941)
- Chorenta leonardi Audureau & Demez, 2013
- Chorenta reticulatus (Dalman in Schoenherr, 1817)
- Chorenta toulgeoti Dalens, Touroult & Tavakilian, 2010
