= Anacolus =

Anacolus sanguineus

Scientific classification
- Kingdom: Animalia
- Phylum: Arthropoda
- Clade: Pancrustacea
- Class: Insecta
- Order: Coleoptera
- Suborder: Polyphaga
- Infraorder: Cucujiformia
- Family: Cerambycidae
- Subfamily: Prioninae
- Tribe: Anacolini
- Genus: Anacolus; Berthold, 1827
- Species: A. sanguineus

Binomial name
- Anacolus sanguineus (Lepeletier & Audinet-Serville in Latreille, 1825)

Genus of beetles

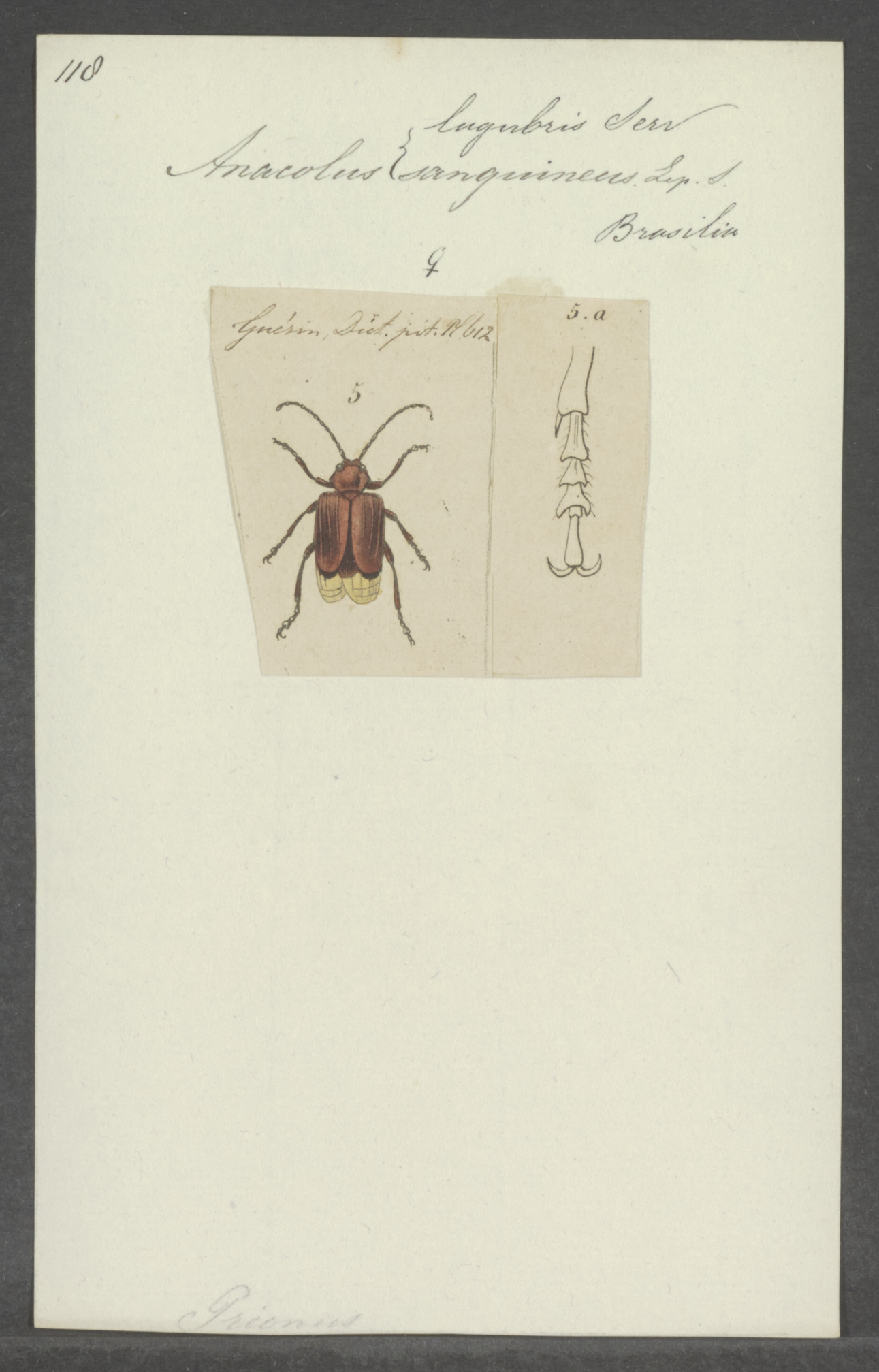

Anacolus is a genus of beetles in the family Cerambycidae. It is monotypic, being represented by the single species, Anacolus sanguineus.
