= Callistoprionus =

Callistoprionus fasciatus

Scientific classification
- Kingdom: Animalia
- Phylum: Arthropoda
- Clade: Pancrustacea
- Class: Insecta
- Order: Coleoptera
- Suborder: Polyphaga
- Infraorder: Cucujiformia
- Family: Cerambycidae
- Subfamily: Prioninae
- Tribe: Prionini
- Genus: Callistoprionus; Tippmann, 1953
- Species: C. fasciatus

Binomial name
- Callistoprionus fasciatus Tippmann, 1953

Genus of beetles

Callistoprionus is a genus of beetles in the family Cerambycidae. It is monotypic, being represented by the single species Callistoprionus fasciatus.
