= Neomallodon =

Neomallodon arizonicus

Scientific classification
- Kingdom: Animalia
- Phylum: Arthropoda
- Clade: Pancrustacea
- Class: Insecta
- Order: Coleoptera
- Suborder: Polyphaga
- Infraorder: Cucujiformia
- Family: Cerambycidae
- Subfamily: Prioninae
- Tribe: Mallodontini
- Genus: Neomallodon; Linsley 1957
- Species: N. arizonicus

Binomial name
- Neomallodon arizonicus (Casey, 1912)

Genus of beetles

Neomallodon is a genus of beetles in the family Cerambycidae. It is monotypic, being represented by the single species Neomallodon arizonicus.

The family Cerambycidae, often referred to as longhorn beetles or longicorns, is a diverse group of beetles known for their long antennae. These beetles are found in various habitats worldwide and can be important components of ecosystems, both ecologically and economically. Neomallodon arizonicus would be a specific member of this family with its own unique characteristics and ecological niche.

== Bibliography ==
- https://bugguide.net/node/view/696492
- Bezark, Larry G. A Photographic Catalog of the Cerambycidae of the World . Retrieved on 22 May 2012.
