= Piesacus =

Scientific classification
- Kingdom: Animalia
- Phylum: Arthropoda
- Clade: Pancrustacea
- Class: Insecta
- Order: Coleoptera
- Suborder: Polyphaga
- Infraorder: Cucujiformia
- Family: Cerambycidae
- Subfamily: Prioninae
- Tribe: Anacolini
- Genus: Piesacus; Galileo, 1987

Genus of beetles

Piesacus is a genus of beetles in the family Cerambycidae, containing the following species:

- Piesacus exiguus Galileo, 1987
- Piesacus magnus Galileo, 1987
