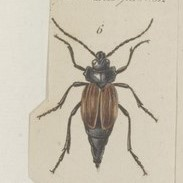
- Prionapterus staphilinus

Scientific classification
- Kingdom: Animalia
- Phylum: Arthropoda
- Clade: Pancrustacea
- Class: Insecta
- Order: Coleoptera
- Suborder: Polyphaga
- Infraorder: Cucujiformia
- Family: Cerambycidae
- Subfamily: Prioninae
- Tribe: Anacolini
- Genus: Prionapterus; Guérin-Méneville, 1831

Synonyms
- Halycidocrius Berg, 1881

= Prionapterus =

Genus of beetles

Prionapterus is a genus of beetles in the family Cerambycidae, containing the following species:

- Prionapterus breyeri Bruch, 1929
- Prionapterus staphilinus Guérin-Méneville, 1831
- Prionapterus suspectus Galileo & Martins, 1990
- Prionapterus travassosi Lane, 1938
- Prionapterus woltersi Bruch, 1925
