= Cubaecola =

Cubaecola hoploderoides

Scientific classification
- Kingdom: Animalia
- Phylum: Arthropoda
- Clade: Pancrustacea
- Class: Insecta
- Order: Coleoptera
- Suborder: Polyphaga
- Infraorder: Cucujiformia
- Family: Cerambycidae
- Subfamily: Prioninae
- Tribe: Callipogonini
- Genus: Cubaecola; Lameere, 1912
- Species: C. hoploderoides

Binomial name
- Cubaecola hoploderoides Lameere, 1912

Genus of beetles

Cubaecola is a genus of beetles in the family Cerambycidae. It is monotypic, being represented by the single species Cubaecola hoploderoides.
