= Episacus =

Episacus pilosicollis

Scientific classification
- Kingdom: Animalia
- Phylum: Arthropoda
- Clade: Pancrustacea
- Class: Insecta
- Order: Coleoptera
- Suborder: Polyphaga
- Infraorder: Cucujiformia
- Family: Cerambycidae
- Subfamily: Prioninae
- Tribe: Anacolini
- Genus: Episacus; Waterhouse, 1880
- Species: E. pilosicollis

Binomial name
- Episacus pilosicollis Waterhouse, 1880

Genus of beetles

Episacus is a genus of beetles in the family Cerambycidae. It is monotypic, being represented by the single species Episacus pilosicollis. The genus was established by Charles Owen Waterhouse in 1880 and is monotypic, containing only the species Episacus pilosicollis Waterhouse, 1880. The species was originally described from Ecuador, with the type locality at Chiguinda in Morona-Santiago. It has also been recorded from Colombia.
