= Quercivir =

Scientific classification
- Kingdom: Animalia
- Phylum: Arthropoda
- Class: Insecta
- Order: Coleoptera
- Suborder: Polyphaga
- Infraorder: Cucujiformia
- Family: Cerambycidae
- Subfamily: Prioninae
- Tribe: Meroscelisini
- Genus: Quercivir; Lameere, 1912

Genus of beetles

Quercivir is a genus of beetles in the family Cerambycidae, containing the following species:

- Quercivir dohrni Lameere, 1912
- Quercivir gounellei Lameere, 1912
