= Andinotrichoderes =

Andinotrichoderes pellitus

Scientific classification
- Kingdom: Animalia
- Phylum: Arthropoda
- Clade: Pancrustacea
- Class: Insecta
- Order: Coleoptera
- Suborder: Polyphaga
- Infraorder: Cucujiformia
- Family: Cerambycidae
- Subfamily: Prioninae
- Tribe: Meroscelisini
- Genus: Andinotrichoderes; Tippmann, 1960
- Species: A. pellitus

Binomial name
- Andinotrichoderes pellitus Tippmann, 1960

Genus of beetles

Andinotrichoderes is a genus of beetles in the family Cerambycidae. It is monotypic, being represented by the single species Andinotrichoderes pellitus.
