= Poecilopyrodes =

Poecilopyrodes pictus

Scientific classification
- Kingdom: Animalia
- Phylum: Arthropoda
- Clade: Pancrustacea
- Class: Insecta
- Order: Coleoptera
- Suborder: Polyphaga
- Infraorder: Cucujiformia
- Family: Cerambycidae
- Subfamily: Prioninae
- Tribe: Mallaspini
- Genus: Poecilopyrodes; Galileo & Martins, 1992
- Species: P. pictus

Binomial name
- Poecilopyrodes pictus (Perty, 1832)

Genus of beetles

Poecilopyrodes is a genus of beetles in the family Cerambycidae. It is monotypic, being represented by the single species Poecilopyrodes pictus.
