= Atrocolus =

Scientific classification
- Kingdom: Animalia
- Phylum: Arthropoda
- Clade: Pancrustacea
- Class: Insecta
- Order: Coleoptera
- Suborder: Polyphaga
- Infraorder: Cucujiformia
- Family: Cerambycidae
- Subfamily: Prioninae
- Tribe: Anacolini
- Genus: Atrocolus; Monné & Monné 2008

Genus of beetles

Atrocolus is a genus of beetles in the family Cerambycidae, containing the following species:

- Atrocolus guarani Monne & Monne, 2011
- Atrocolus mariahelenae Monne & Monne, 2008
