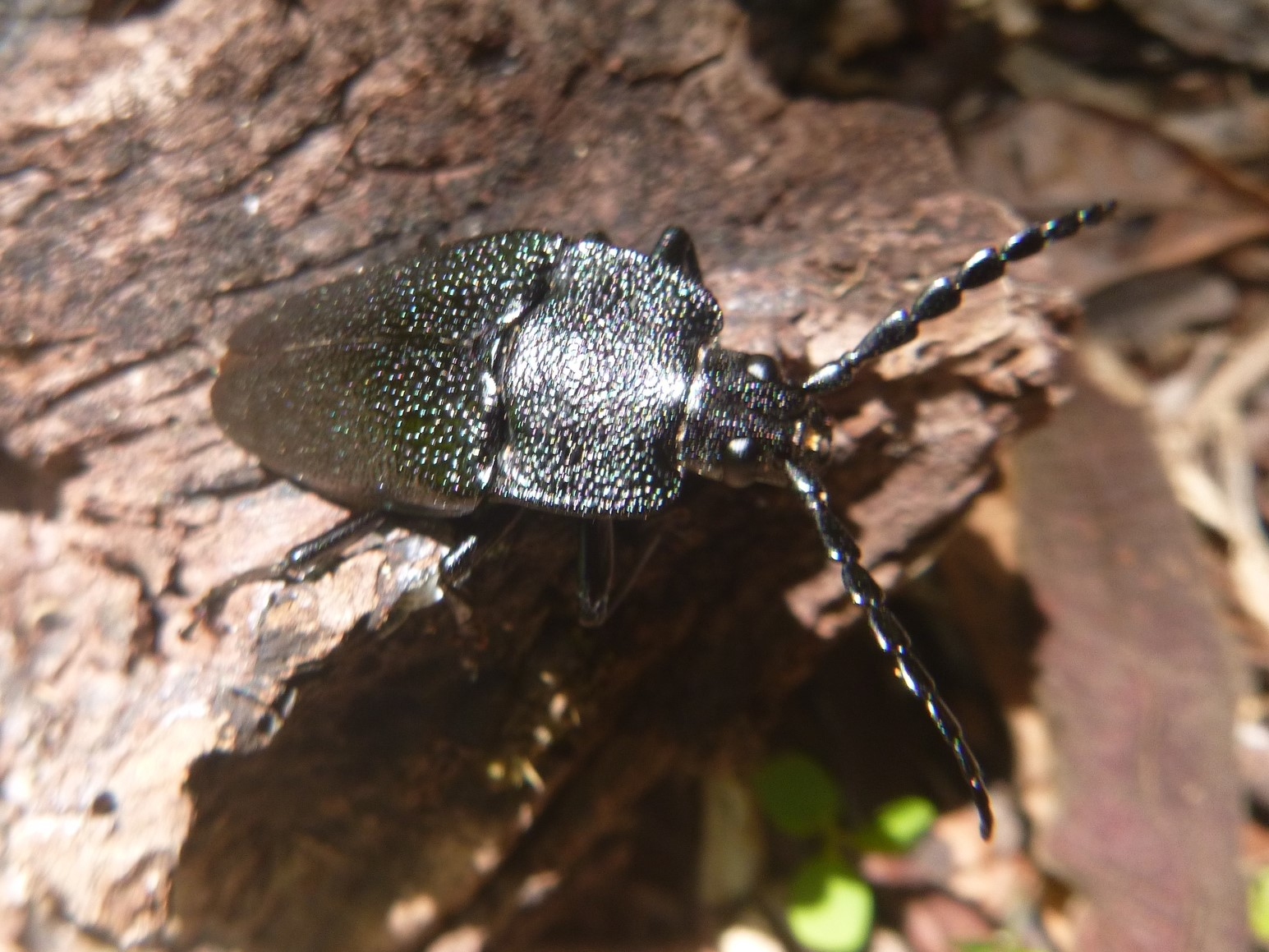
- Holonotus laevithorax

Scientific classification
- Kingdom: Animalia
- Phylum: Arthropoda
- Clade: Pancrustacea
- Class: Insecta
- Order: Coleoptera
- Suborder: Polyphaga
- Infraorder: Cucujiformia
- Family: Cerambycidae
- Subfamily: Prioninae
- Tribe: Solenopterini
- Genus: Holonotus; Thomson, 1860

= Holonotus =

Genus of beetles

Holonotus is a genus of beetles in the family Cerambycidae, containing the following species:

- Holonotus laevithorax (White, 1853)
- Holonotus latithorax Thomson 1861
- Holonotus nigroaeneus Bates, 1869
- Holonotus sternalis Gahan, 1894
