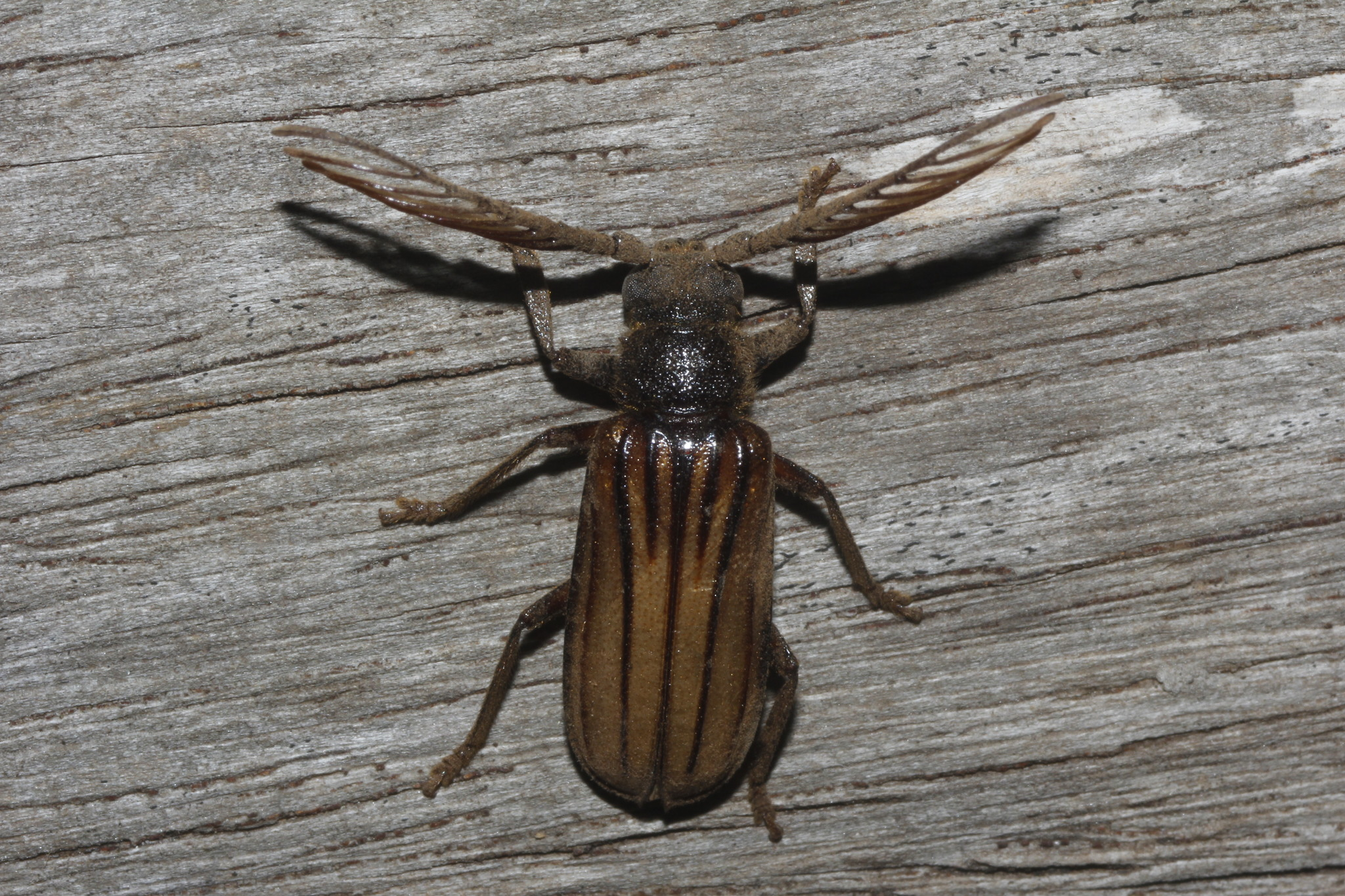

Scientific classification
- Kingdom: Animalia
- Phylum: Arthropoda
- Clade: Pancrustacea
- Class: Insecta
- Order: Coleoptera
- Suborder: Polyphaga
- Infraorder: Cucujiformia
- Family: Cerambycidae
- Subfamily: Prioninae
- Tribe: Meroscelisini
- Genus: Lasiogaster; Gahan, 1892
- Species: L. costipennis

Binomial name
- Lasiogaster costipennis Gahan, 1892

= Lasiogaster =

Lasiogaster costipennis

Genus of beetles

Lasiogaster is a species of beetle in the family Cerambycidae. It is monotypic, being represented by the single species Lasiogaster costipennis.
