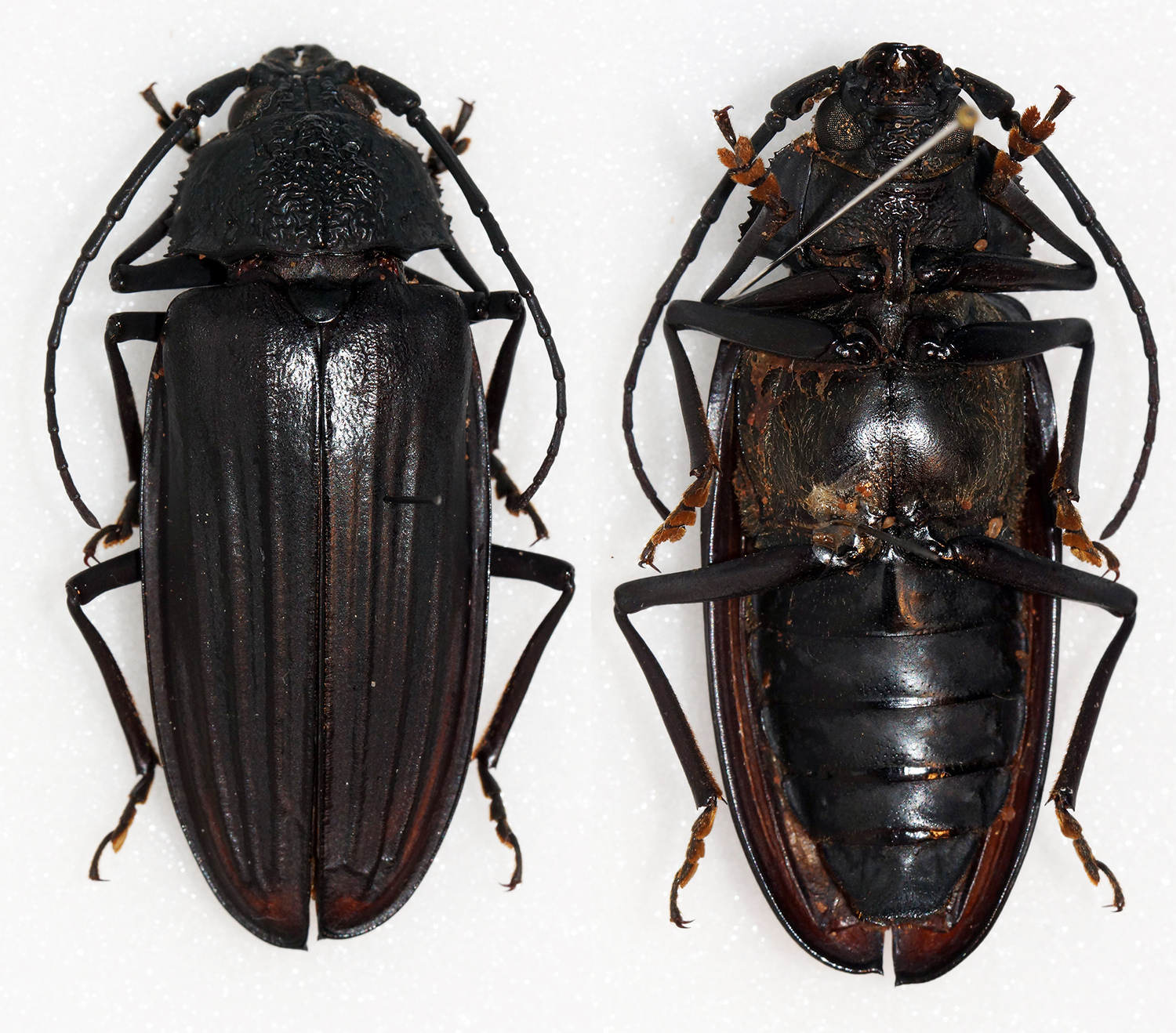
- Size: 42mm, sex: female

Scientific classification
- Kingdom: Animalia
- Phylum: Arthropoda
- Clade: Pancrustacea
- Class: Insecta
- Order: Coleoptera
- Suborder: Polyphaga
- Infraorder: Cucujiformia
- Family: Cerambycidae
- Subfamily: Prioninae
- Tribe: Callipogonini
- Genus: Navosoma; Gemminger & Harold, 1872
- Species: N. luctuosum

Binomial name
- Navosoma luctuosum (Schoenherr, 1817)

Synonyms
- (Genus): Naosoma Gemminger & Harold, 1872

= Navosoma =

Navosoma luctuosum

Genus of beetles

Navosoma is a genus of beetles in the family Cerambycidae. It is monotypic, being represented by the single species Navosoma luctuosum.
