= Mallodonhoplus =

Mallodonhoplus nobilis

Scientific classification
- Kingdom: Animalia
- Phylum: Arthropoda
- Clade: Pancrustacea
- Class: Insecta
- Order: Coleoptera
- Suborder: Polyphaga
- Infraorder: Cucujiformia
- Family: Cerambycidae
- Subfamily: Prioninae
- Tribe: Macrotomini
- Genus: Mallodonhoplus; Thomson, 1860
- Species: M. nobilis

Binomial name
- Mallodonhoplus nobilis Thomson, 1861

Synonyms
- (Genus): Mallodonoplus Gemminger & Harold, 1872

Genus of beetles

Mallodonhoplus is a genus of beetles in the family Cerambycidae. It is monotypic, being represented by the single species Mallodonhoplus nobilis.
