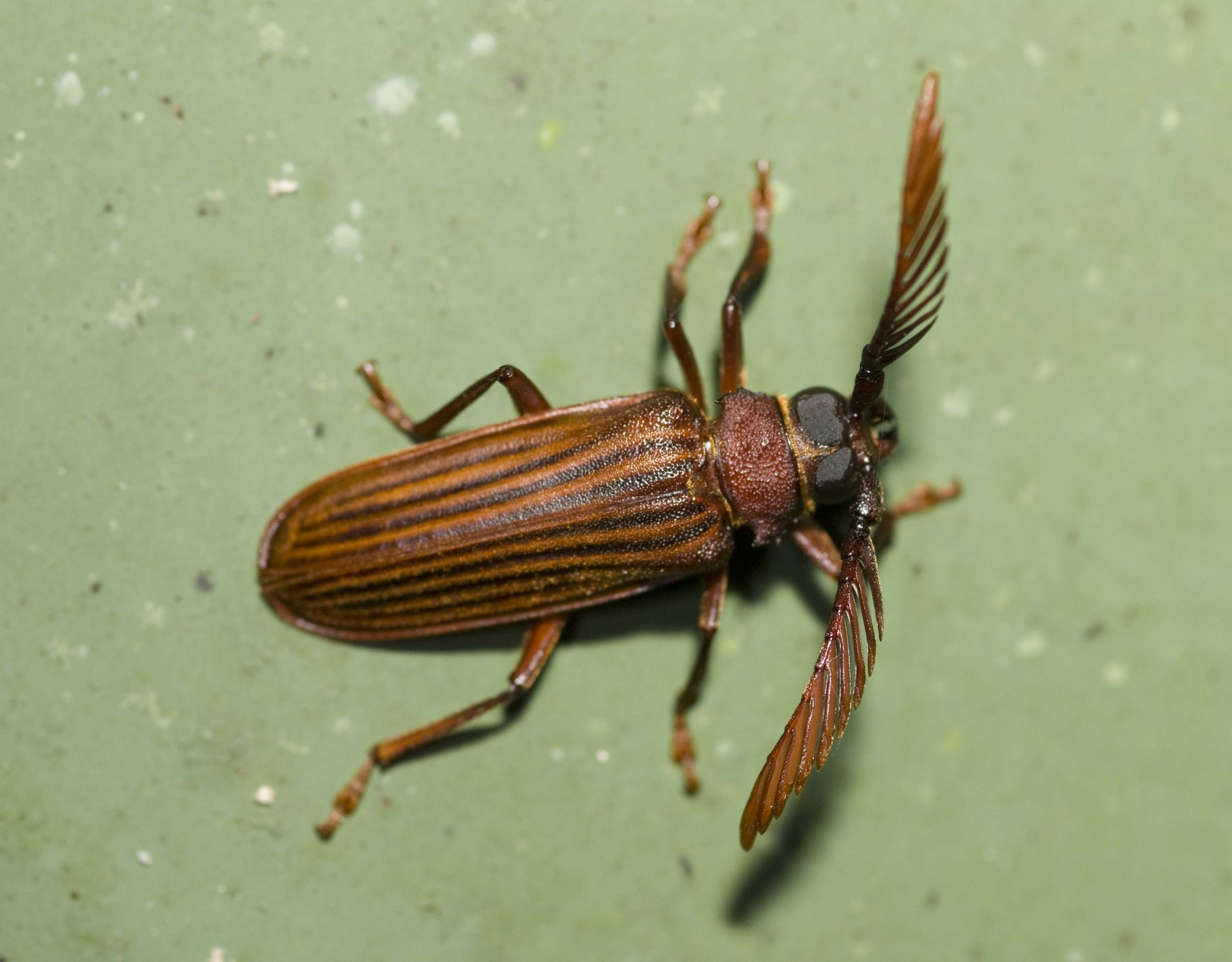
- Hyleoza lineata

Scientific classification
- Kingdom: Animalia
- Phylum: Arthropoda
- Clade: Pancrustacea
- Class: Insecta
- Order: Coleoptera
- Suborder: Polyphaga
- Infraorder: Cucujiformia
- Family: Cerambycidae
- Subfamily: Prioninae
- Tribe: Meroscelisini
- Genus: Hyleoza; Galileo, 1987

= Hyleoza =

Genus of beetles

Hyleoza is a genus of beetles in the family Cerambycidae, containing the following species:

- Hyleoza confusa Tavakilian & Galileo, 1991
- Hyleoza lineata (Bates, 1869)
