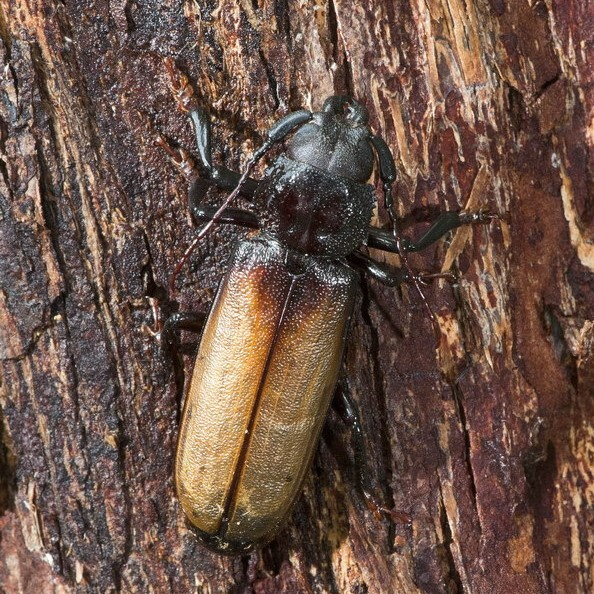

Scientific classification
- Kingdom: Animalia
- Phylum: Arthropoda
- Clade: Pancrustacea
- Class: Insecta
- Order: Coleoptera
- Suborder: Polyphaga
- Infraorder: Cucujiformia
- Family: Cerambycidae
- Subfamily: Prioninae
- Tribe: Macrotomini
- Genus: Basitoxus; Audinet-Serville, 1832
- Species: B. megacephalus

Binomial name
- Basitoxus megacephalus (Germar, 1824)

= Basitoxus =

Basitoxus megacephalus

Genus of beetles

Basitoxus is a genus of beetles in the family Cerambycidae. It is monotypic, being represented by the single species Basitoxus megacephalus.
