= Prosternodes =

Prosternodes cinnamipennis

Scientific classification
- Kingdom: Animalia
- Phylum: Arthropoda
- Clade: Pancrustacea
- Class: Insecta
- Order: Coleoptera
- Suborder: Polyphaga
- Infraorder: Cucujiformia
- Family: Cerambycidae
- Subfamily: Prioninae
- Tribe: Solenopterini
- Genus: Prosternodes; Thomson, 1860
- Species: P. cinnamipennis

Binomial name
- Prosternodes cinnamipennis (Chevrolat, 1838)

Genus of beetles

Prosternodes is a genus of beetles in the family Cerambycidae. It is monotypic, being represented by the single species Prosternodes cinnamipennis.
