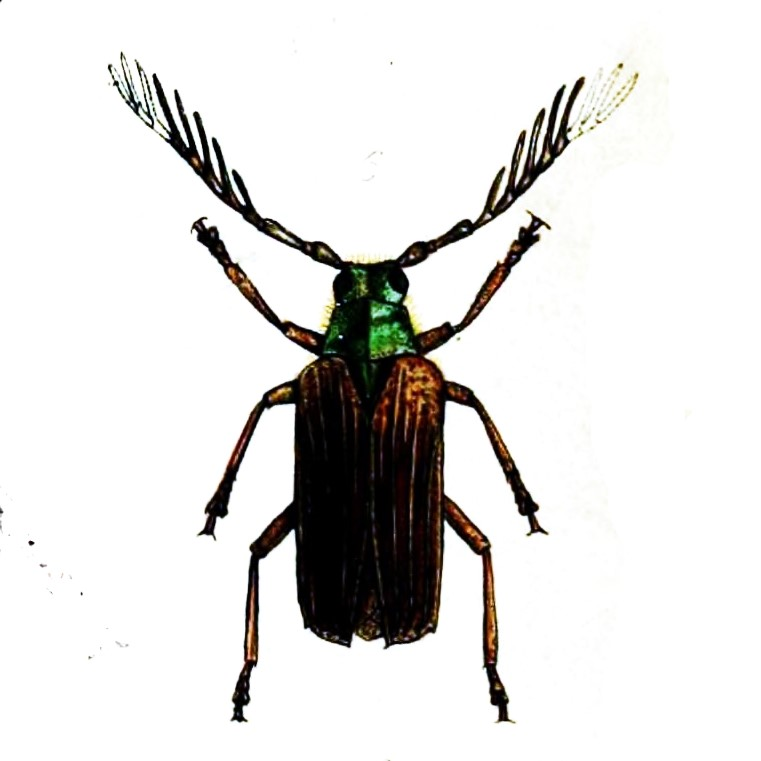

Scientific classification
- Kingdom: Animalia
- Phylum: Arthropoda
- Clade: Pancrustacea
- Class: Insecta
- Order: Coleoptera
- Suborder: Polyphaga
- Infraorder: Cucujiformia
- Family: Cerambycidae
- Subfamily: Prioninae
- Tribe: Anacolini
- Genus: Calloctenus; White, 1850
- Species: C. pulcher

Binomial name
- Calloctenus pulcher White, 1850

= Calloctenus =

Calloctenus pulcher

Genius of beetles

Calloctenus is a genus of beetle in the family Cerambycidae. It is monotypic, being represented by the single species, Calloctenus pulcher.
