= Eurypoda (beetle) =

Scientific classification
- Kingdom: Animalia
- Phylum: Arthropoda
- Clade: Pancrustacea
- Class: Insecta
- Order: Coleoptera
- Suborder: Polyphaga
- Infraorder: Cucujiformia
- Family: Cerambycidae
- Subfamily: Prioninae
- Genus: Eurypoda; Saunders, 1853

Type species
- Eurypoda antennata Saunders, 1853

Genus of beetles

Eurypoda is a genus of long-horned beetles in the family Cerambycidae. It is represented by several species.

== Taxonomy ==
The following species are recognised in the genus Eurypoda:

- Eurypoda antennata Saunders, 1853
- Eurypoda (Neoprion) batesi Gahan, 1894
- Eurypoda (Eurypoda) unicolor Hayashi, 1956
