= Allomallodon =

Scientific classification
- Kingdom: Animalia
- Phylum: Arthropoda
- Clade: Pancrustacea
- Class: Insecta
- Order: Coleoptera
- Suborder: Polyphaga
- Infraorder: Cucujiformia
- Family: Cerambycidae
- Tribe: Mallodonini
- Genus: Allomallodon; Santos-Silva & Galileo 2010

Genus of beetles

Allomallodon is a genus of beetles in the family Cerambycidae, containing the following species:

- Allomallodon bolivianus Wappes & Santos-Silva 2019
- Allomallodon hermaphroditus (Thomson, 1867)
- Allomallodon popelairei (Lameere, 1902)
