= Otheostethus =

Scientific classification
- Kingdom: Animalia
- Phylum: Arthropoda
- Clade: Pancrustacea
- Class: Insecta
- Order: Coleoptera
- Suborder: Polyphaga
- Infraorder: Cucujiformia
- Family: Cerambycidae
- Tribe: Anacolini
- Genus: Otheostethus

Genus of beetles

Otheostethus is a genus of beetles in the family Cerambycidae, containing the following species:

- Otheostethus disjunctus Galileo, 1987
- Otheostethus melanurus Bates, 1872
