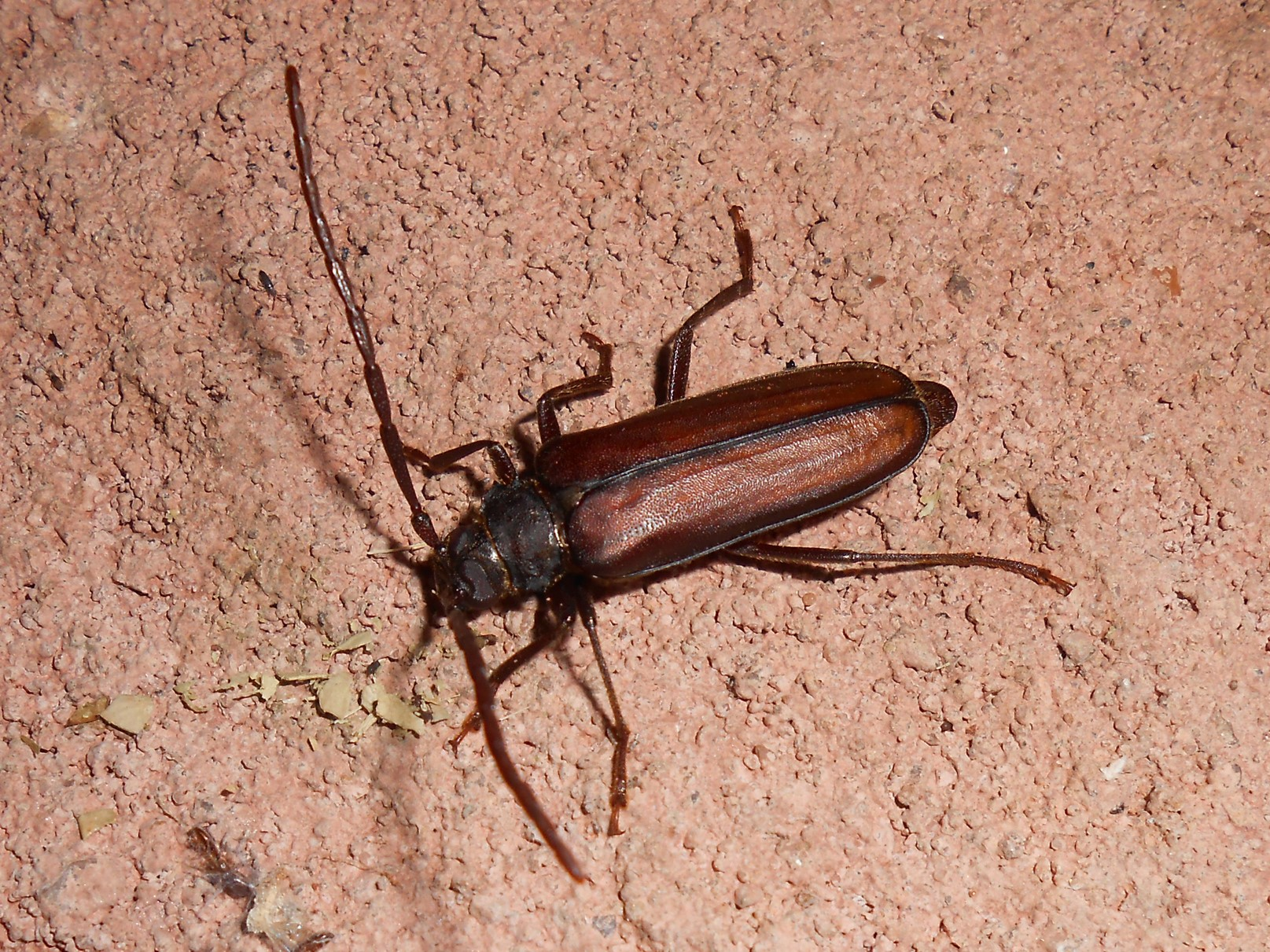
- Meroscelisus servillei

Scientific classification
- Kingdom: Animalia
- Phylum: Arthropoda
- Clade: Pancrustacea
- Class: Insecta
- Order: Coleoptera
- Suborder: Polyphaga
- Infraorder: Cucujiformia
- Family: Cerambycidae
- Tribe: Meroscelisini
- Genus: Meroscelisus; Audinet-Serville, 1832

Synonyms
- Syennesis Pascoe, 1888; Meroscelicus Chenu, 1870

= Meroscelisus =

Genus of beetles

Meroscelisus is a genus of beetles in the family Cerambycidae, containing the following species:

- Meroscelisus apicalis White, 1853
- Meroscelisus opacus Buquet, 1860
- Meroscelisus servillei Thomson, 1865
- Meroscelisus thoracicus Seabra, 1942
- Meroscelisus violaceus Audinet-Serville, 1832
- Meroscelisus zikani Melzer, 1919
