= Derancistrus =

Scientific classification
- Kingdom: Animalia
- Phylum: Arthropoda
- Clade: Pancrustacea
- Class: Insecta
- Order: Coleoptera
- Suborder: Polyphaga
- Infraorder: Cucujiformia
- Family: Cerambycidae
- Tribe: Solenopterini
- Genus: Derancistrus; Audinet-Serville, 1832

Synonyms
- Harmosternus Gahan, 1890

Genus of beetles

Derancistrus is a genus of beetles in the family Cerambycidae, containing the following species:

- Derancistrus anthracinus (Gahan, 1890)
- Derancistrus coeruleus Lameere, 1912
- Derancistrus elegans (Palisot de Beauvois, 1805)
- Derancistrus hovorei Lingafelter & Woodley, 2007
- Derancistrus pilosus Devesa, Fonseca & Barro, 2017
