= Cycloprionus =

Cycloprionus flavus

Scientific classification
- Kingdom: Animalia
- Phylum: Arthropoda
- Clade: Pancrustacea
- Class: Insecta
- Order: Coleoptera
- Suborder: Polyphaga
- Infraorder: Cucujiformia
- Family: Cerambycidae
- Genus: Cycloprionus; Tippmann, 1953
- Species: C. flavus

Binomial name
- Cycloprionus flavus Tippmann, 1953

Synonyms
- Cycloprionus ornatus Lane, 1972

Genus of beetles

Cycloprionus is a species of beetle in the family Cerambycidae. It is monotypic, being represented by the single species Cycloprionus flavus.
