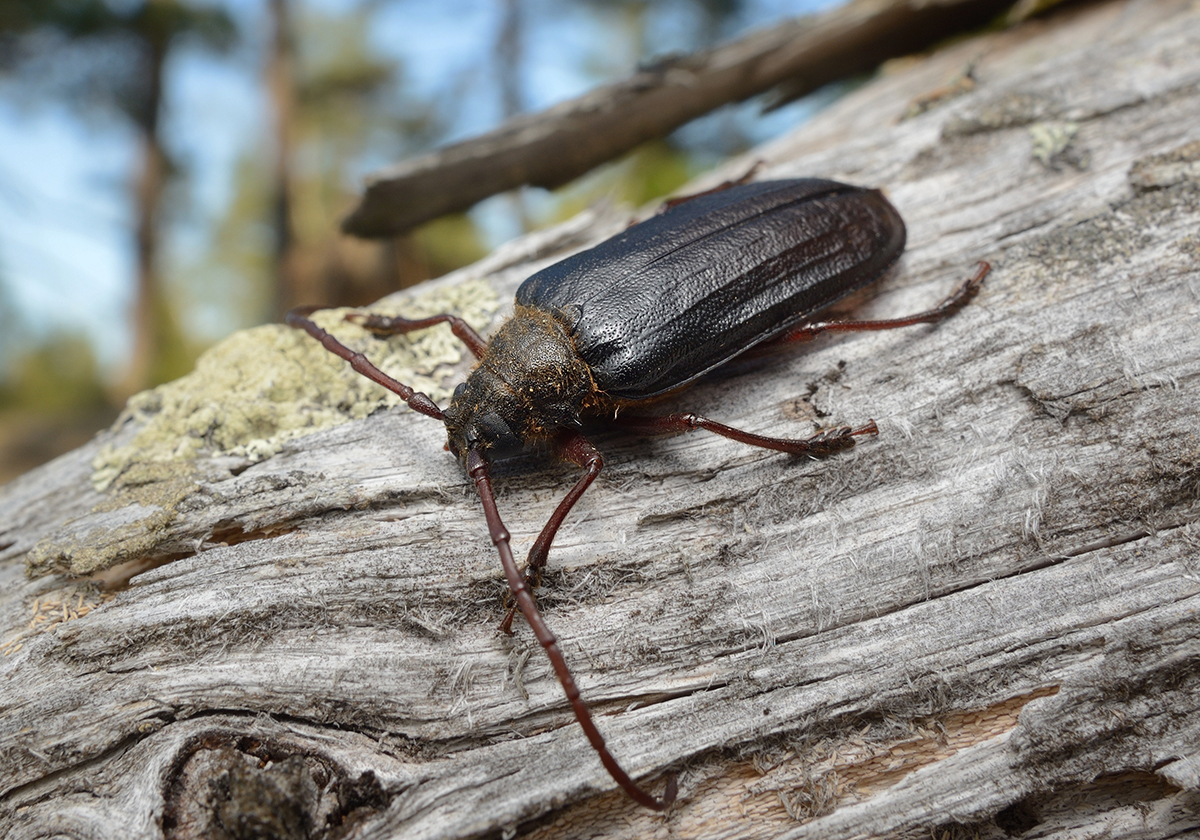

Scientific classification
- Kingdom: Animalia
- Phylum: Arthropoda
- Class: Insecta
- Order: Coleoptera
- Suborder: Polyphaga
- Infraorder: Cucujiformia
- Family: Cerambycidae
- Genus: Tragosoma
- Species: T. depsarium

Binomial name
- Tragosoma depsarium Linnaeus, 1767

= Tragosoma depsarium =

Species of beetle

Tragosoma depsarium is a species of longhorn beetle in the family Cerambycidae. It is the only one of its genus in Europe and is found mainly in cool regions of Northern Europe and Siberia, along with the high altitudes of the Alps and other mountain ranges. This beetle typically lives in open and manageable dry forest areas with old trees. Due to the decline of coniferous forests with a corresponding proportion of old wood, the beetle populations are also declining. In some regions of its range, including Germany, Tragosoma depsarium is considered endangered.

== Characteristics ==
=== Characteristics of the adults ===
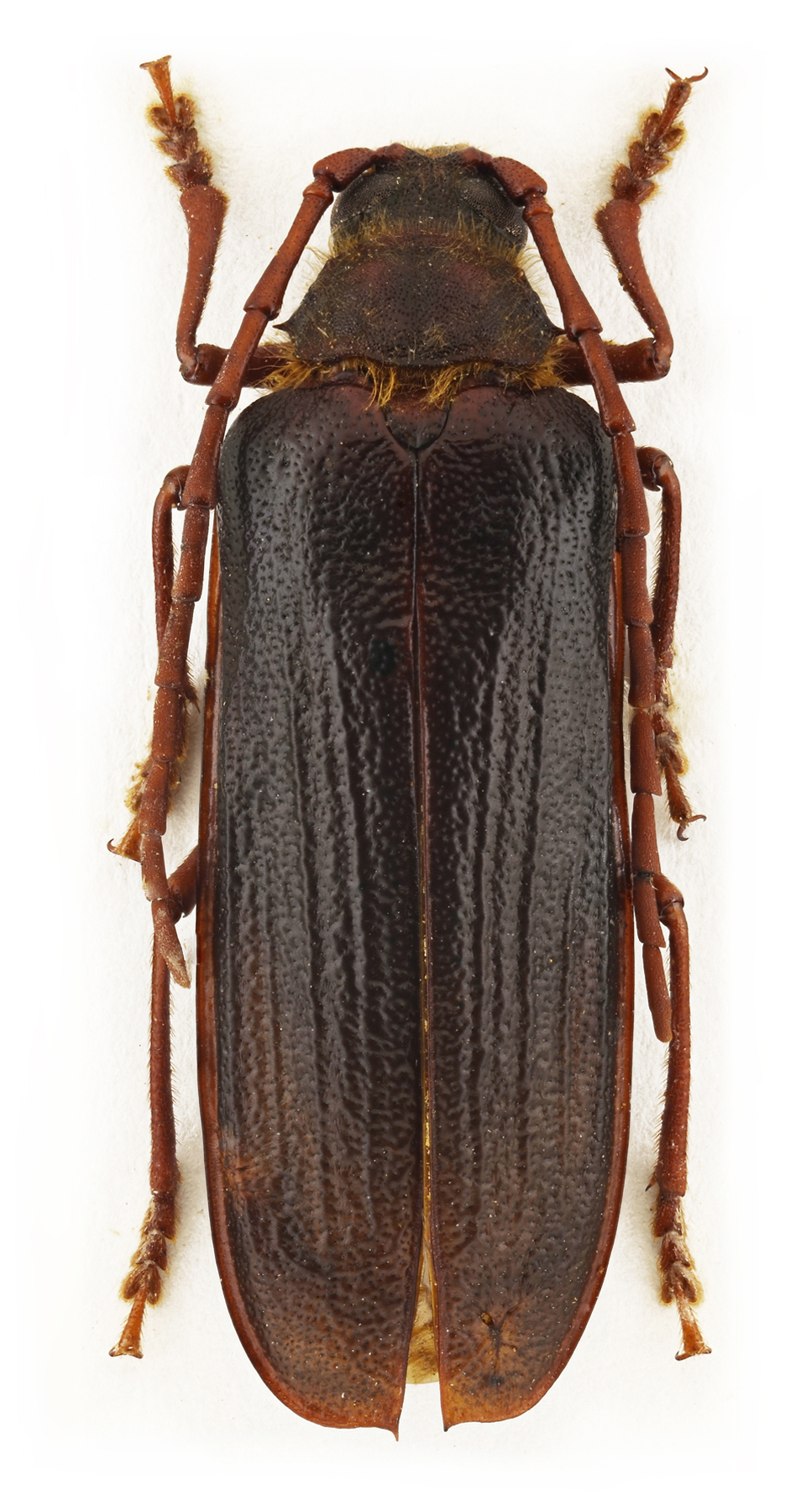
Tragosoma depsarium

Tragosoma depsarium reaches a body length of 18 to 36 mm (0.71 to 1.42 in) and is slightly longer and narrower than the sawyer (Prionus coriarius). The color of the body is reddish brown, or reddish to dark brown. It is flatly arched. The pronotum is about twice as wide as it is long and widest in the middle. The central area, the disc, is uneven and heavily haired. The sides of the pronotum are poorly margined and clearly punctured; there is a distinctive spine on the sides behind the middle. The upper side of the pronotum is densely covered in yellowish hairs; the sides are pointed backwards and tapering. The elytra are almost parallel and about 2.5 times as long as they are wide together. They are well-dotted on a chagrined ground with traces of fine stripes; they also have 3 to 4 more prominent fine ridges. The tip angle is pointed at the wing suture.

The head is narrower than the pronotum and heavily punctured. The antennae are retracted next to the eye socket and bare. The third antennae are slightly elongated, but they do not reach the base of the pronotum compared to those of the Aegosoma scabricorne. In males, the antennae clearly surpass the middle of the elytra, whereas in females they reach about the middle of the elytra. The terminal phalanx of the mandibles is truncated. The legs are slightly a lighter reddish-brown than the body; and the fore tibiae do not have a pronounced inner furrow.

=== Characteristics of the larvae ===
Tragosoma depsarium reaches a maximal length of 50 mm (2.0 in). The pleural sclerites on the first to sixth abdominal segment are rather small and only unclearly developed. The legs are noticeably four-limbed; a coxa is not present and the thigh ring (trochanter) is reduced. The pronotum has no transverse bands and, as in other Prioninae, it is not conspicuously rough.

The head capsule is approximately square and narrowly and deeply notched posteriorly; there are distinct stemmata on its sides. The labrum is about as wide as it is long. The front of the head is keeled and has 4 keeled denticles, the lateral ones being flat and less prominent. The cardo is freely flexible and well developed. In comparison to the larva of another member of the longhorn beetle family (Ergates faber), the third antennal limb is somewhat larger and cylindrical, and is about as long as it is wide. The palpifer has no appendage.

== Distribution ==
Tragosoma depsarium has a Palearctic distribution and is found in Central and Northern Europe as well as in Southern Russia, Siberia and neighboring regions up to the Altai region. Further south it is restricted to mountainous areas.

In northern Europe, the species is mainly found in the central provinces of Sweden and Finland, but can also be found in the Baltic region. For Europe as a whole, a boreoalpine distribution is given, which means that the beetle is mainly found in cooler areas of the north and in higher alpine regions. In Central Europe, it is mainly found in the south and southwest of the Alps at an altitude of no less than 1,000 m (3,300 ft). In Germany, for instance, it is widespread in Bavaria and Thuringia, where it was introduced with coniferous wood. In addition, it is mainly found in Austria, Switzerland, the Czech Republic and Slovakia. In Albania, the species was first detected in 2007. In the south, the distribution area is the Southern Alps, the Carpathians and the Pyrenees. It mainly lives in the higher subalpine altitudes, such as in the Pyrenees at altitudes of 1,500 to 1,800 m (4,900 to 5,900 ft).

== Lifestyle ==
As a boreoalpine, cold-loving species, the beetle lives mainly in cool coniferous forests and parklands at high altitudes. Depending on the local climate, it can be found from June to August. The beetles spend the day under rotting and fallen bark on deadwood trunks and old tree stumps or under mushroomed trunks. They become active in the evening and wander around their habitats. On humid days, they fly and meet at suitable wood for egg-laying. Especially the males have also been observed approaching light. In some cases, the animals are associated with another long-horned beetle (Ergates faber).

The development of the larvae takes at least three years[3] and occurs in the wood of older brittle trunks and stumps of conifers; the animals pupate in early summer. The main host trees documented were Scots pine (Pinus sylvestris), but also Rumelian pine (Pinus peuce), as well as fir (Abies) and larch (Larix) species.

A study in Sweden revealed that the larvae were primarily found in older tree trunks that were over 200 years old and that had been stored in dry and sun-exposed areas. This was mainly attributed to the rapid colonization of the younger logs by brown rot fungi, which inhibit their usage by the beetles. In addition, most of the beetle larvae were found in clearings where wood regeneration by tree seedlings took place or in pine stands with naturally low tree density. In contrast, the larvae were never found within dense and protected forest stands.

== Classification ==
The first scientific reference of this species was made by Carl Linnaeus, who described it as Prionus depsarium in his Systema Naturae in 1767. Jean Guillaume Audinet-Serville defined the Tragosoma genus in 1832 and categorized Tragosoma depsarium as the only type or species of the new genus.

Some beetles in North America were also regarded as belonging to this species, but further analysis determined they were different species, such as Tragosoma harrisii and Tragosoma soror, which was only newly described in 2017. Tragosoma depsarium is thus confirmed as a purely Palaearctic species. According to a cladogram on the relationships within the genus, Tragosoma depsarium is classified in a group with the two species Tragosoma harrisii and Tragosoma nigripenne, which are widespread in Canada and the United States, and is considered a sister species of these.

The name of the genus is based on the body shape of the animals, which is reminiscent of a billy goat. "Tragosoma" is composed of the Greek words "tragos" for " he-goat" and "soma" for "body". The epithet "depsarium" comes from the Latin and means "kneader" or "worker through".

== Endangerment ==
Tragosoma depsarium is usually classified as a very rare species, as Edmund Reitter noted in 1912. It is classified as a category 2 primeval forest relict, which can exist in completely unmanaged old-growth forests as well as in old, near-natural commercial forests with a long habitat tradition. The species was already listed as "critically endangered" in the Bavarian Red List of endangered longhorned beetles in 2003 and also had this status for Germany in general. For Europe, on the other hand, the species was considered "not endangered" (least concern) in a report by the IUCN in cooperation with the European Union in 2010. According to Kust 2016, Tragosoma depsarium "is already considered threatened with extinction in Germany and, according to various specialist authors, is one of the greatest rarities in Central Europe." In Austria, the species is only known from 15 localities and there are also only a few older records in South Tyrol, Italy, where the species is considered lost after a last sighting in 1967.

Given the results of the Swedish study, it can be assumed that the population is suffering from the segmentation of habitats with stands of old trees that are needed for their development. Due to the loss of these habitats by about 25 % in the 10 years prior to the study, a rapid decline in the population was expected. A corresponding decline is also described for Russia, and the beetle is on the corresponding red lists of endangered species in numerous regions, including Karelia, Udmurtia, Komi, Chuvashia, Leningradskaya, Kirav, Tyumen, Ivanovo, Kaluga, Moscow, Yaroslavl and Nizhny Novgorod.

== Bibliography ==
- Klausnitzer, Bernhard; Klausnitzer, Ulrich; Wachmann, Ekkehard; Hromádko, Zdeněk (2018). "Art: Tragosoma depsarium (Linnaeus 1767) – Zottenbock". Die Bockkäfer Mitteleuropas. p. 348. ISBN 978-3-89432-864-1.
