= Blue-tailed trogon =

The common name blue-tailed trogon can refer to more than one species of bird in the trogon family:

- Javan trogon (Apalharpactes reinwardtii) and Sumatran trogon (Apalharpactes mackloti); formerly considered to be a single species.
- Chocó trogon (Trogon comptus).
