= Billy goat (disambiguation) =

A billy goat is a male, not castrated goat.

Billy goat may also refer to:

- Billy Goat (band), American band
- William Windsor (goat), a goat also known as Billy the Goat
- Billy Goat, a character in the Donald Duck universe
- The Billy Goat Tavern, a chain of taverns mostly in the Chicago area.
- Sergeant Bill, a Canadian WW1 military mascot

== See also ==
- Curse of the Billy Goat, a sports-related curse supposedly placed on the Chicago Cubs Major League Baseball franchise
