= Whipsnade Zoo =

Zoo near Dunstable in Bedfordshire, England

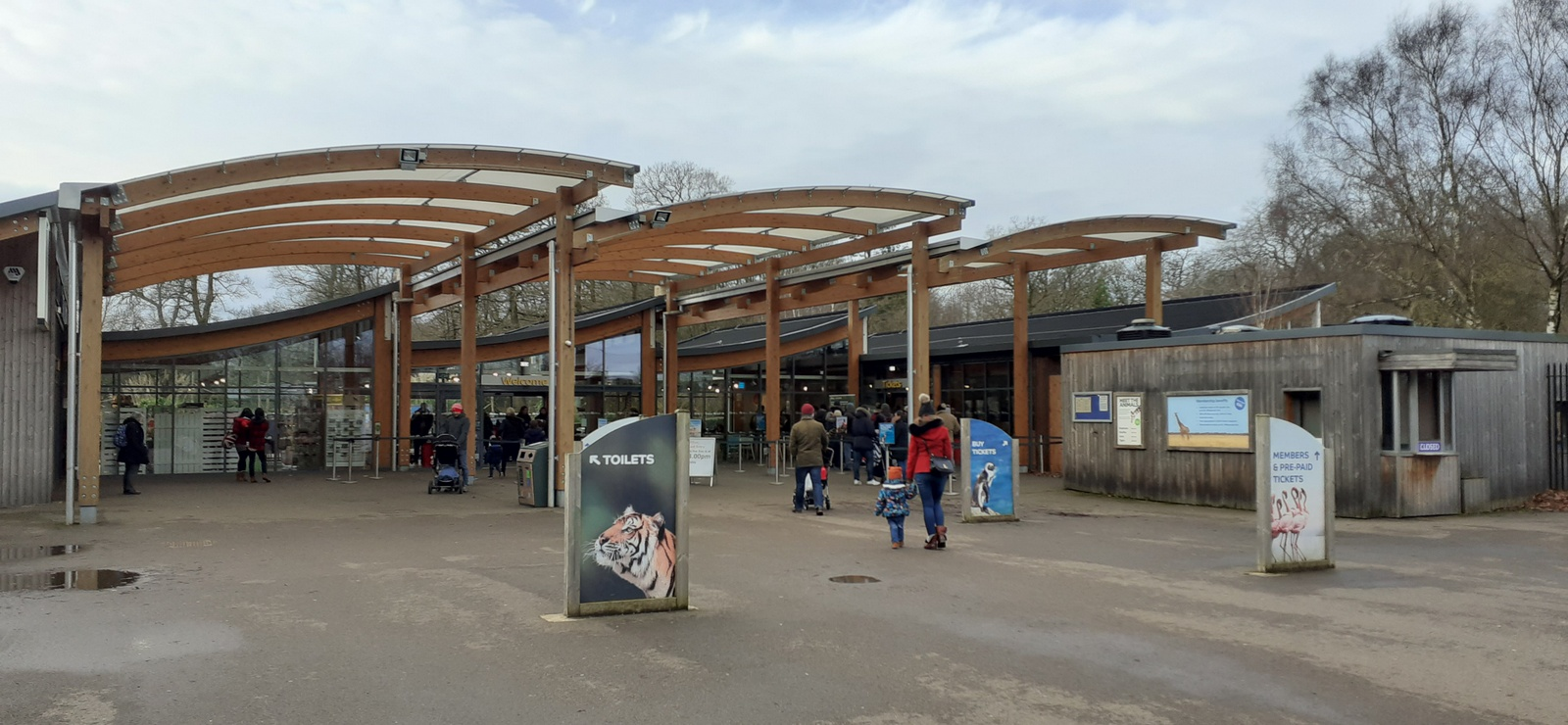
- Main entrance to Whipsnade Zoo
- Interactive map of Whipsnade Zoo
- 51°50′59″N 000°32′39″W
- Date opened: 1931
- Location: Whipsnade, near Dunstable, England
- Land area: 600 acres (2.4 km^{2})
- No. of animals: 10,364 (2026)
- No. of species: 245+ (2026)
- Annual visitors: 923,438 in 2025
- Memberships: BIAZA, EAZA, WAZA
- Major exhibits: Cheetah Rock, Passage through Asia, In with the Lemurs
- Website: www.whipsnadezoo.org

Whipsnade Zoo, formerly known as Whipsnade Wild Animal Park, is a zoo located in Whipsnade, near Dunstable, Bedfordshire, England. It is one of two zoos (the other being London Zoo in Regent's Park, London) that is looked-after by the Zoological Society of London, a charity devoted to the worldwide conservation of animals and their habitats.

== Description ==
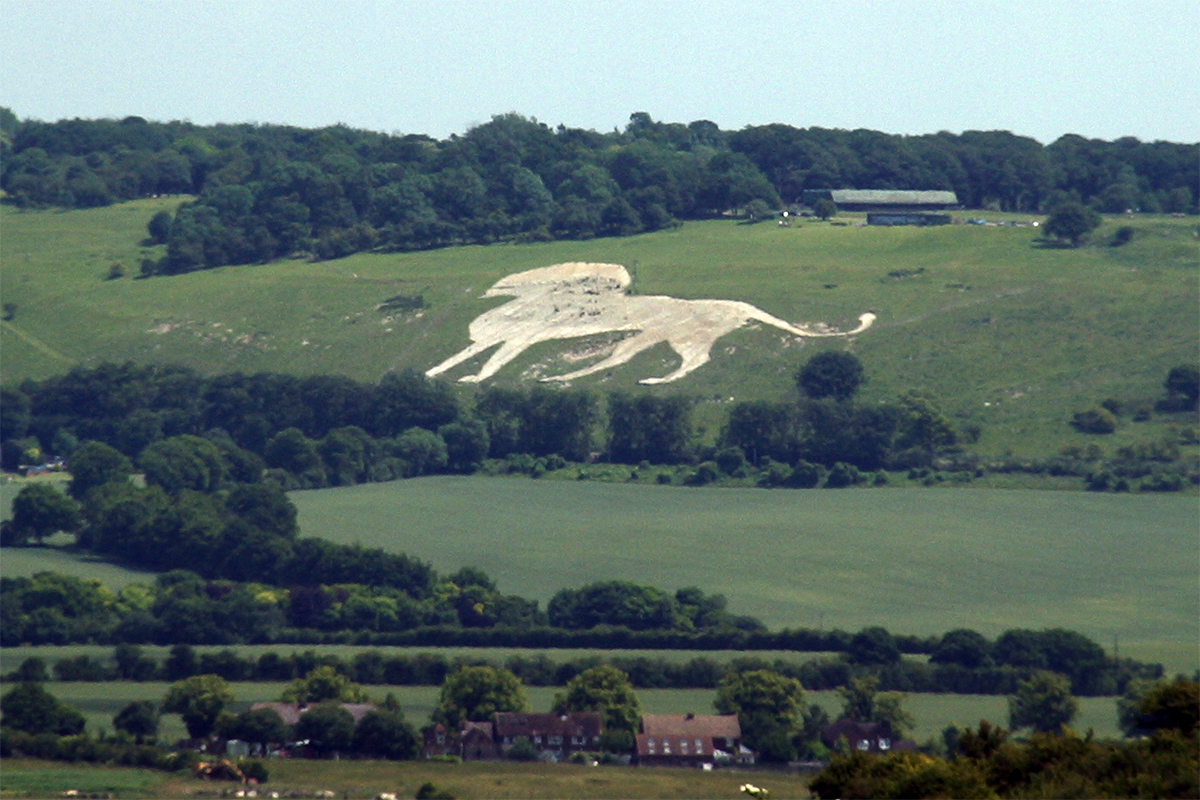
Whipsnade hill figure seen from Ivinghoe Beacon

The park covers 600 acres (240 hectares), and can even be located from the air because of the Whipsnade White Lion, a large lion-shaped hill figure carved into the side of the Dunstable Downs (part of the Chiltern Hills.)

Due to its size, visitors may walk or drive their cars between the various animal enclosures. Cars are able to access a drive-through area where animals are able to roam free around the cars. There is also a train service named Great Whipsnade Railway it is a 2 ft 6 in (762 mm) narrow-gauge railway.

Whipsnade Zoo is the UK's largest zoo and one of Europe's largest wildlife conservation parks. It is home to 10,364 animals, many of which are endangered in the wild. The majority of the animals are kept within sizeable enclosures; others, such as Patagonian maras, and red-necked wallabies, roam freely around the park.

== History ==
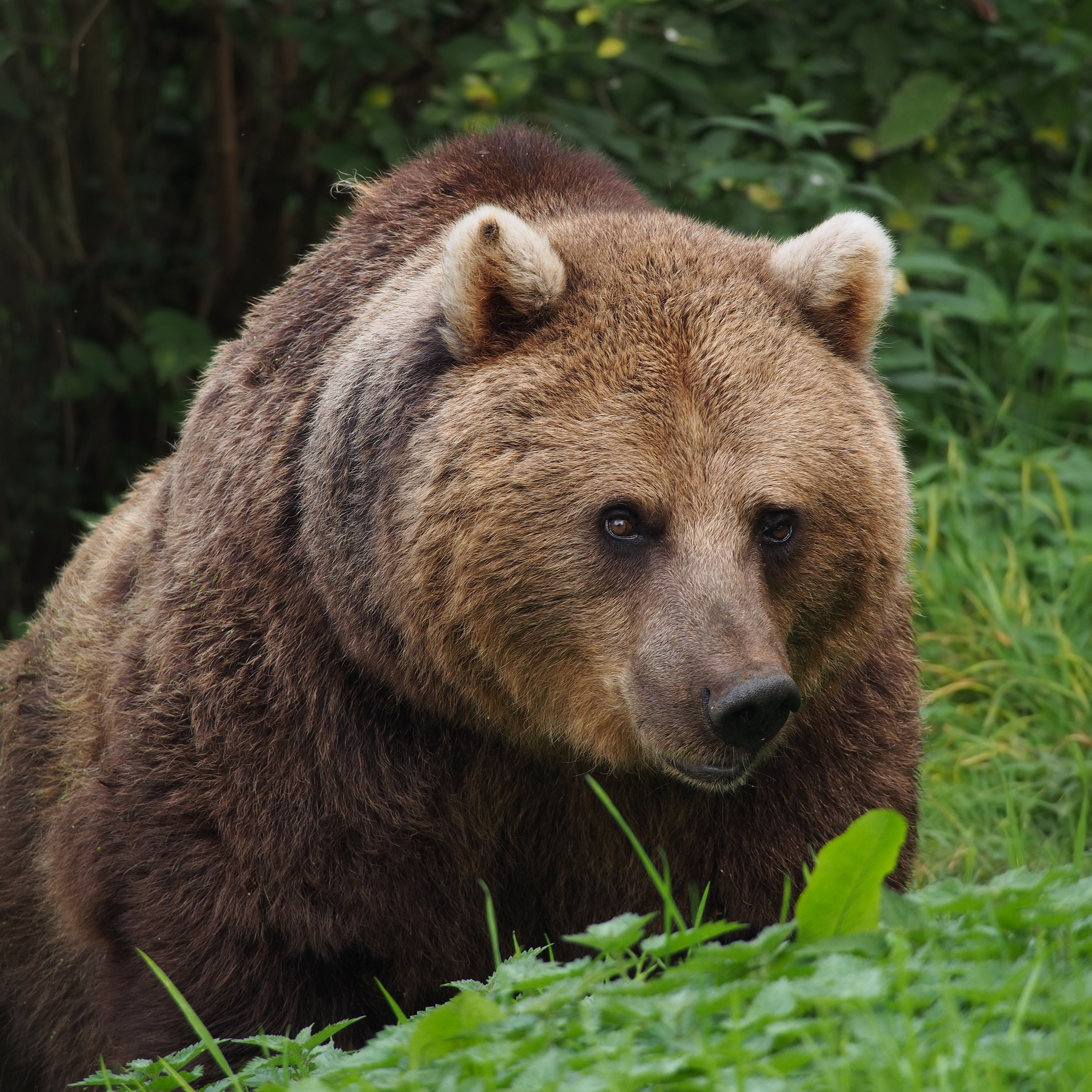
Eurasian brown bear at the zoo

=== Early years ===
The Zoological Society of London was founded in 1826 by Sir Stamford Raffles with the aim of promoting the worldwide conservation of animals and their habitats. To this end London Zoo in Regents Park, London was established.

Almost 100 years later, Sir Peter Chalmers Mitchell (ZSL Secretary 1903–1935) was inspired by a visit to the Bronx Zoo, United States to create a park in Britain as a conservation centre.

Hall Farm, a derelict farm on the Dunstable Downs, 30 mi (48 km) to the north of London was purchased by the Zoological Society of London in 1926 for £13,480 12s 10d. The site was fenced, roads built and trees planted.

The first animals arrived at the park in 1928, including two Lady Amherst's pheasants, a golden pheasant, and five red junglefowls. Others soon followed including muntjacs, llamas, wombats and skunks.

Whipsnade Park Zoo opened on Sunday 23 May 1931. It was the first open zoo in Europe to be easily accessible to the visiting public. It was an immediate success and received over 38,000 visitors on the following Monday. The brown bear enclosure is a surviving feature from the earliest days of the zoo.

The collection of animals was boosted in 1932 by the purchase of a collection from a defunct travelling menagerie and some of the larger animals walked to the zoo from Dunstable station.

The distinctive white lion hill figure was completed in 1933 and refreshed in 2025.

=== World War II ===
During the Second World War, the zoo acted as a refuge for animals evacuated from Regent's Park London Zoo. The celebrity giant pandas Ming, Sung and Tang were among these animals but were soon returned to London to boost morale in the capital. During 1940, 41 bombs fell on the park with little damage to the zoo structure; some of the ponds in the park are the remains of bomb craters from this period. A spur-winged goose and a three-year-old giraffe named Boxer, which had been born at the zoo, died as a result of the bombings; the giraffe ran herself to exhaustion in fright at the explosions.

=== Recent developments ===
In 1996, a new elephant house and paddock was opened to replace the architecturally outstanding but cramped original elephant house designed by Lubetkin and Tecton in 1935. The old house remains at the zoo as a Grade II* listed building and its associated enclosure contains the zoo's lemurs.

In the early 2000s the zoo added new exhibits including Lions of the Serengeti in 2005, a walk-through lemur enclosure in 2007 (officially opened on 28 March 2007 by Dominic Byrne from The Chris Moyles Show on BBC Radio 1, who is a regular visitor to the park), the Rhinos of Nepal exhibit in February 2007, Cheetah Rock on Easter 2008, a sloth bear exhibit in May 2008, and Wild Wild Whipsnade in May 2009. In July 2008, the Café on the Lake was reopened after remodelling, with its name changed to the Wild Bite Café. As of 2025, it is called the Base Camp Restaurant.

In May 2009, William Windsor (known as Billy), a goat mascot of the British Army's Royal Welsh regiment, retired to the zoo after eight years' distinguished service performing ceremonial duties.

In April 2024, the new Monkey Forest habitat was opened. It consists of a 2 kilometres (1.2 mi) walk where visitors have a different perspective of the passage through Asia on one side, and two new mixed-species enclosures on the other, housing langurs, macaques, babirusa, and anoa.

== Exhibits ==
=== In with the Lemurs ===
Situated near the entrance of the zoo, "In with the Lemurs" is a walkthrough habitat with additional viewing area housing ring-tailed lemurs and black lemurs.

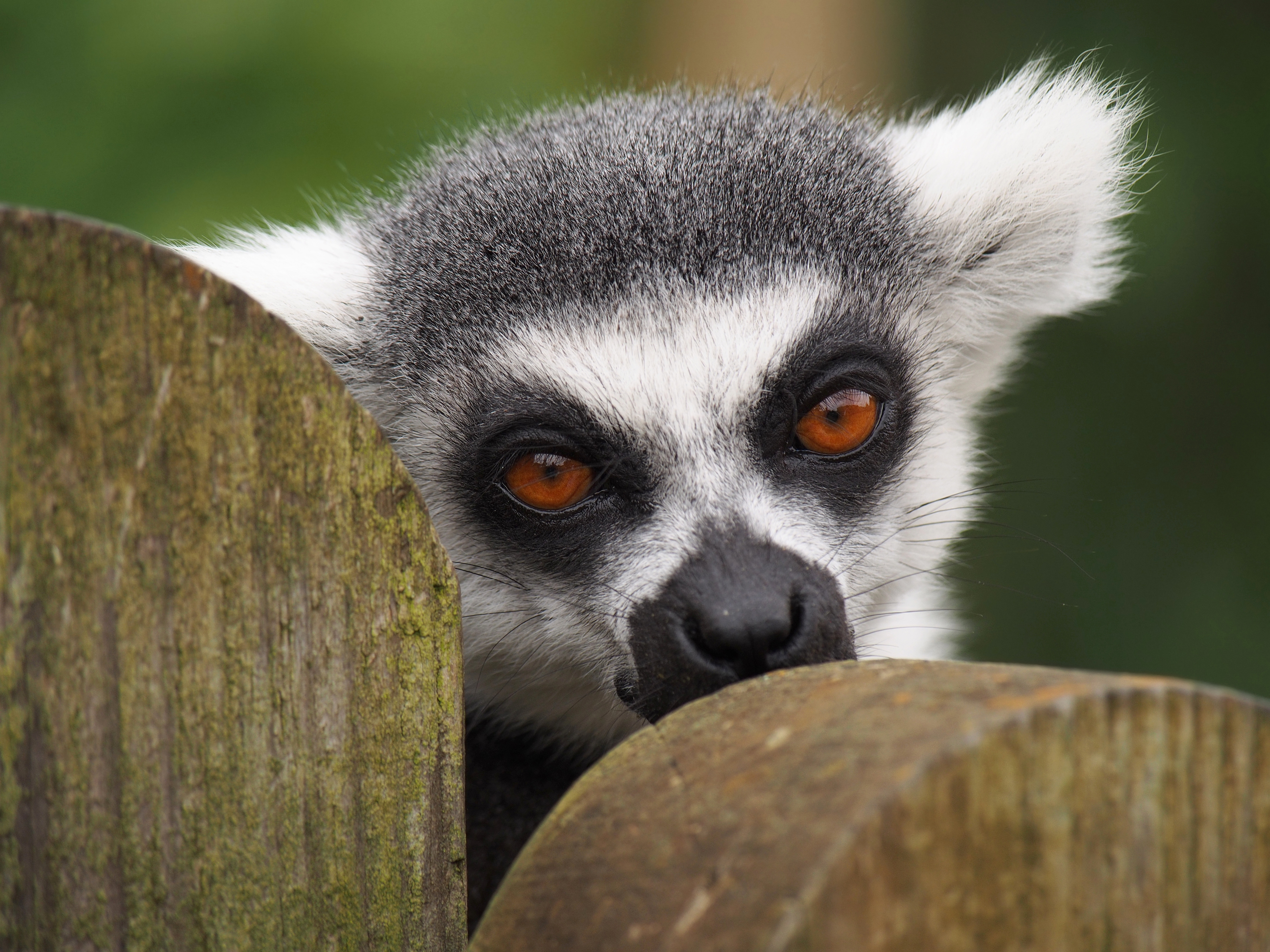
A resident of "In with the Lemurs", an attraction at the zoo

=== Aquarium and Butterfly House ===
The Butterfly House opened in 2016, the house is home to various species of butterfly, Victoria crowned pigeons and West African dwarf crocodiles, it is a walkthrough exhibit so there is not barrier between the butterflies and visitors. In 2019, the aquarium was opened, situated in the same building. It houses green tree pythons, panther chameleons, hillstream loaches, blind cave fish, turquoise dwarf geckos, pinstripe dambas, chinese crocodile lizards and many types of pupfish.

=== Passage Through Asia ===
Passage Through Asia is a large paddock with no boundaries between visitors and the animals. Visitors can only access the area by driving through it in their cars or riding on the Jumbo Express train. The paddock houses herds of Bactrian camels, barasinghas, fallow deer, sika deer, Père David's deer and yaks.

=== Lions ===
Opened in 2005 and originally named "Lions of the Serengeti", this exhibit is home to a pride of eight northern lions. The pride of African lions consists of an adult male named Malik two adult females named Waka and Winta and 5 cubs born in June 2026. In early 2022, the zoo temporarily housed five lions named Zero, Tor, Jabu, Mo and Kaya from Africa Alive! Suffolk, after their enclosure suffered damage from Storm Eunice. From May 2022 to Summer 2023, the zoo housed Khari, a male lion from Blackpool Zoo while his enclosure was being redeveloped.

=== Elephant herd ===
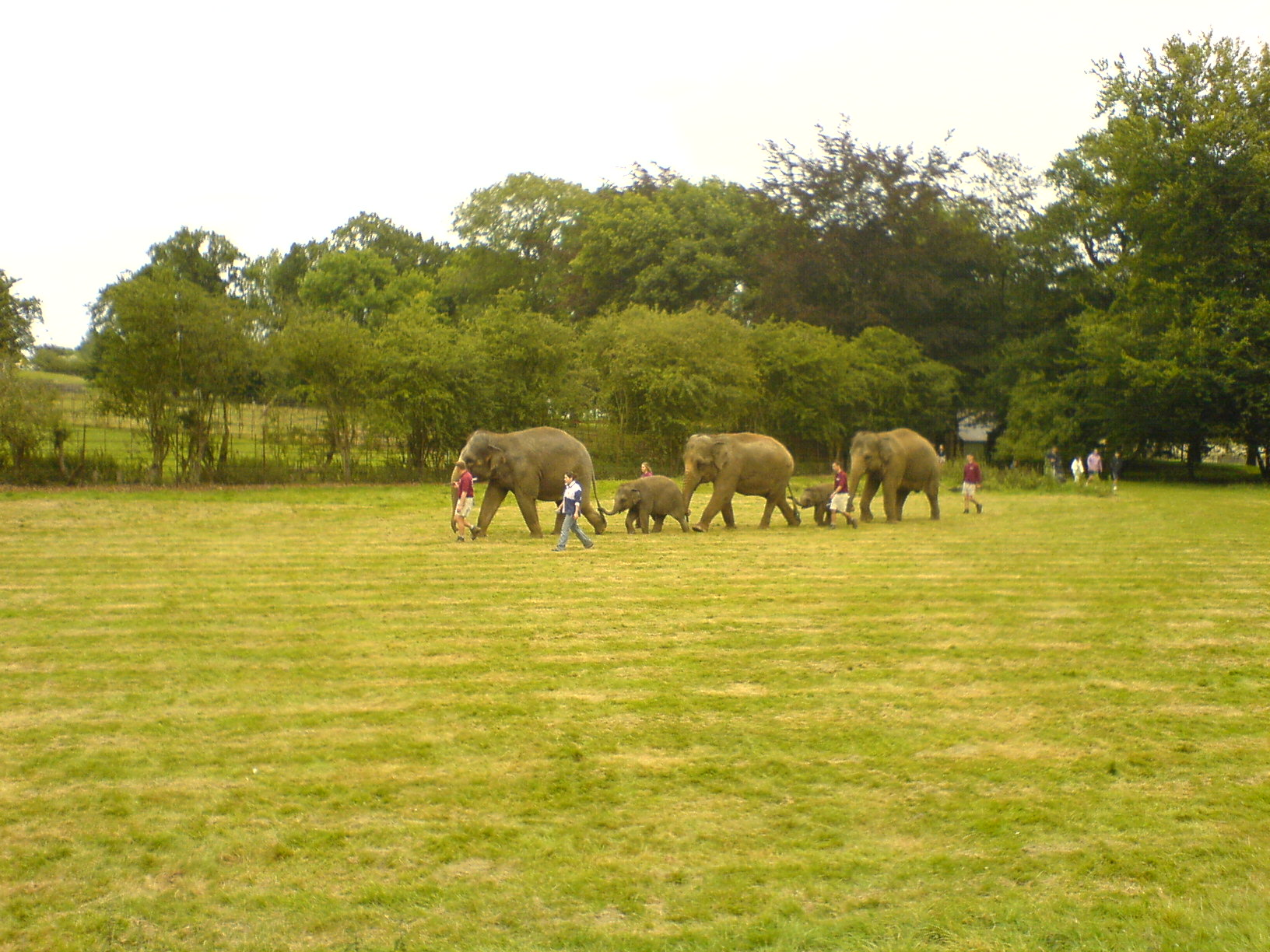
Elephants being led around ZSL Whipsnade Zoo

ZSL Whipsnade Zoo cares for a herd of six Asian elephants, consisting of cows Kaylee, Lucha, Donna, Nang Phaya and bull elephant Ming Jung, alongside a male calf named Anusorn.

Their paddock is seven acres, and features three pools, mud wallows and dust baths. One of the previous elephants who has now moved to Chester Zoo was named Karishma, and her pregnancy with her first calf George, featured heavily in the first series of the ITV documentary programme The Zoo, which follows the daily lives of the staff at both Whipsnade and London Zoo. Another female calf was born during Elizabeth II's 90th birthday celebrations and was named in her honour and has also since moved to Chester Zoo. The elephant herd moved to a new indoor facility in 2017, the £2 million Centre for Elephant Care.

=== Rhinos of Nepal ===
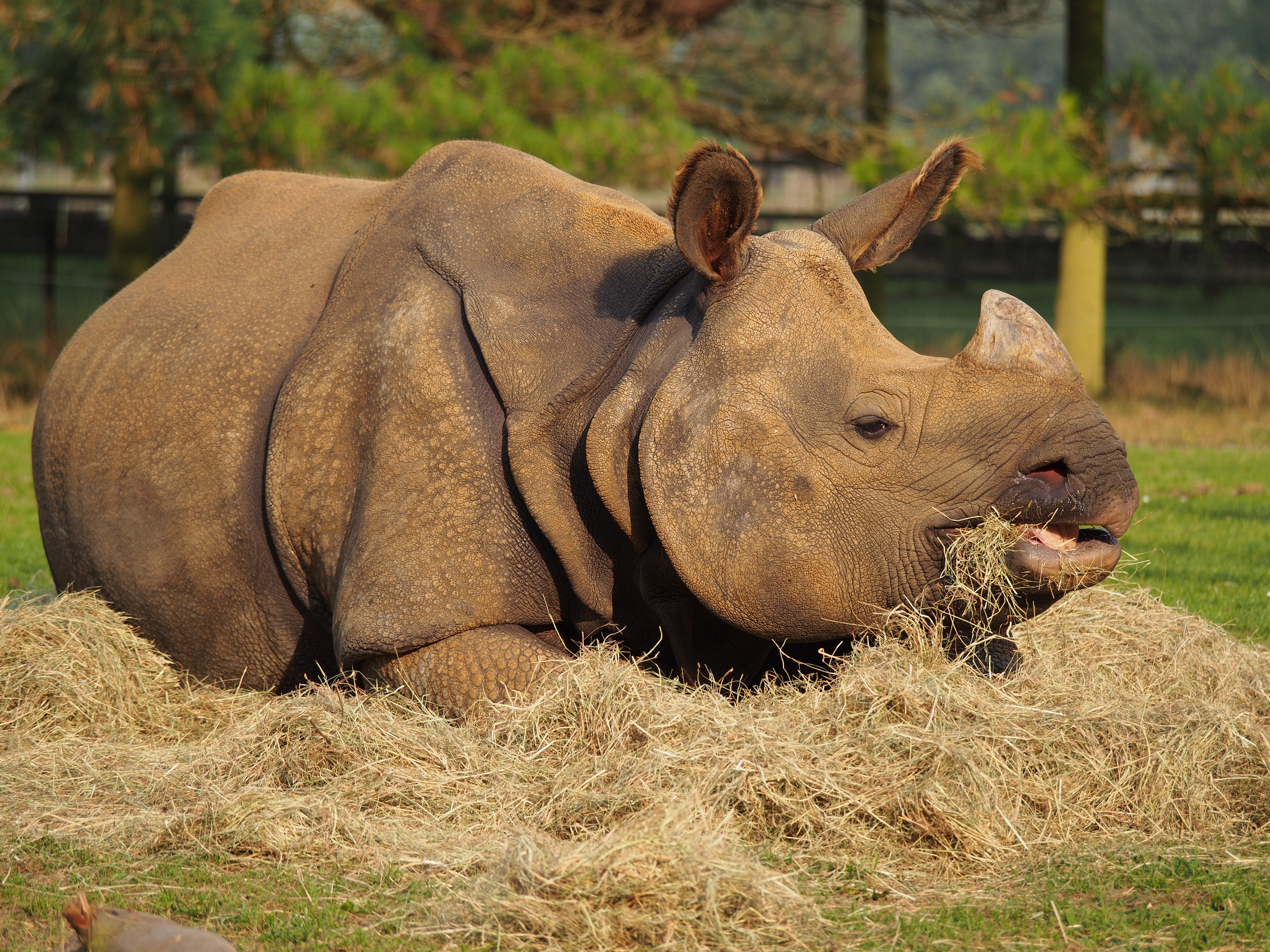
Nepalese rhino feeding at Whipsnade

Opened in February 2008, Rhinos of Nepal now houses a pair of Indian rhinoceroses. The building aims to be environmentally friendly, using rain water captured on the roof to fill the pools, heating the pools with solar energy and featuring barriers that are made from recycled wooden railway sleepers instead of metal bars.

=== Birds of the World ===
A daily educational show in which keepers present various bird species demonstrating their natural abilities to an audience of visitors.

=== Cheetah Rock ===
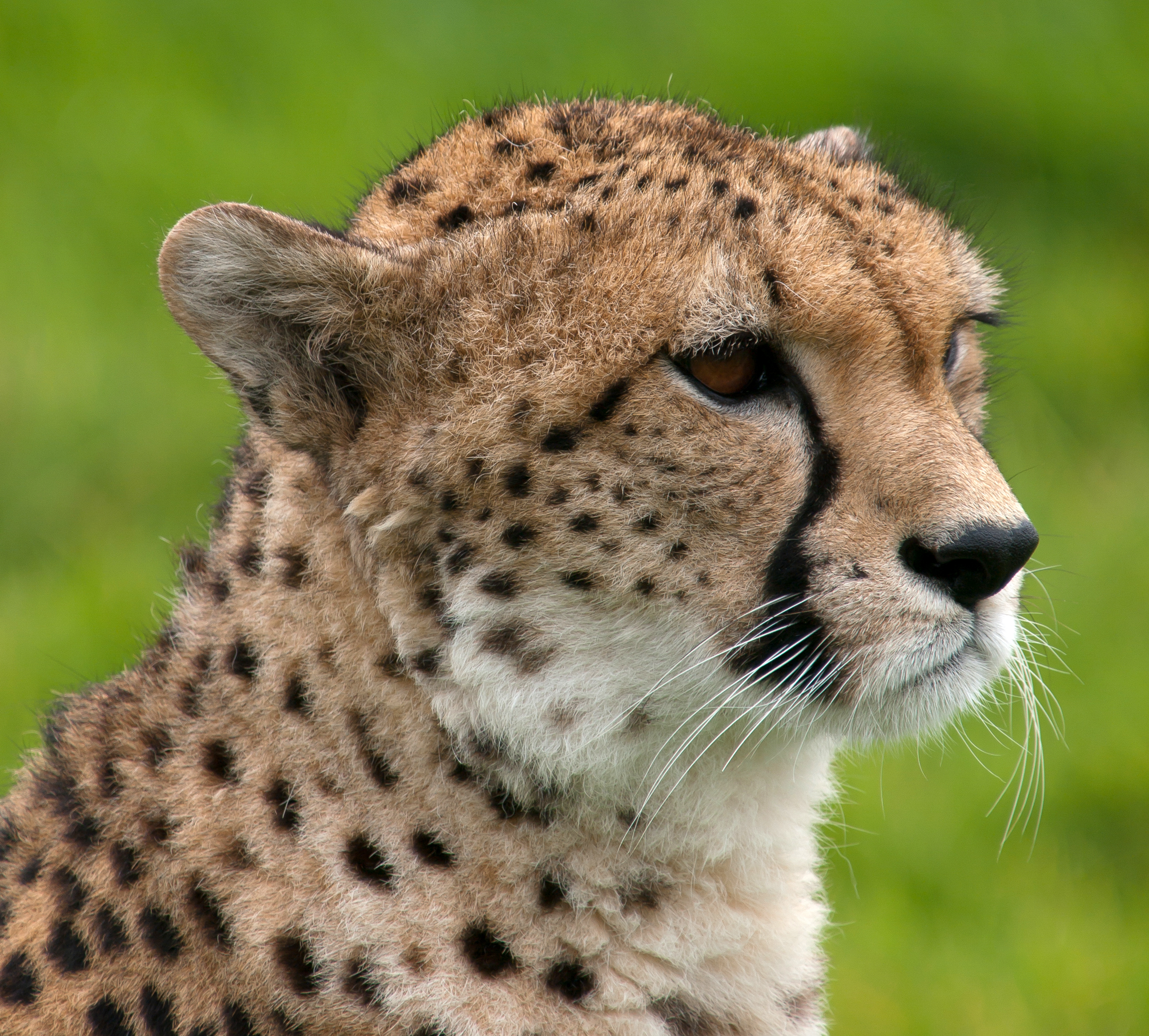
A Sudan cheetah at Cheetah Rock

Opened in 2008, this exhibit is home to a group of cheetahs, and features displays that inform visitors about ZSL's cheetah conservation project in Tanzania. Despite ZSL's conservation project being focused on East Africa, the Cheetahs at Whipsnade are in fact Sudan cheetahs from Northeast Africa. The zoo is now home to two female cheetahs named Amira and Zara who arrived from CERZA in 2025 as well as seven cubs born in May 2026

=== Hullabazoo Farm ===
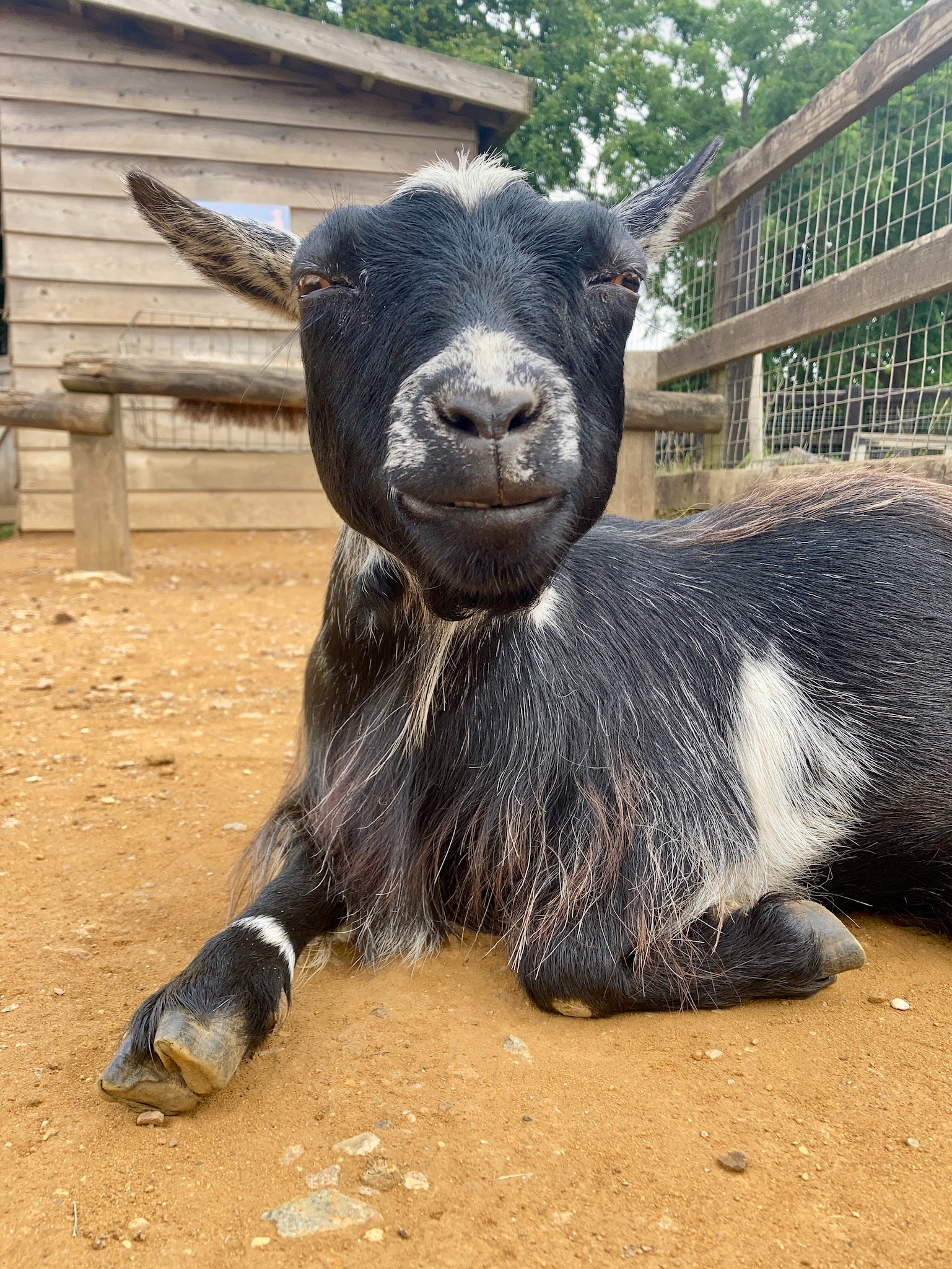
African pygmy goat at the Children's Farm

An area aimed primarily at children and housing domesticated livestock such as turkeys, llamas, alpacas, cows, silkie chickens, horses, miniature ponies, donkeys, rabbits, guinea pigs, and goats, most of which are free roaming. The Hullabazoo Farm was also once home to a female Bennett's wallaby named Pip, who was abandoned by her mother and hand-reared by keepers.

=== Europe ===
Previously known as "Wild Wild Whipsnade" this area opened in 2010 and is home to several species of animal that lived in the wild in Britain hundreds of years ago. These include Eurasian brown bears, wolverines, Eurasian lynxes, reindeer, wild boars, and European bison.

=== Tiger Falls ===
Tiger Falls opened in 1991 to house the zoo's Amur tigers. It is a large enclosure featuring multiple climbing frames, a pond and a waterfall. The habitat is currently home to a male Sumatran tiger named Crispin, who arrived from London Zoo in 2026.

=== Other animals ===
Other species in the zoo's collection that are not part of a themed exhibit include blesbok, Asian small-clawed otters, red pandas, gemsbok, meerkats, aardvarks, Cape porcupines, common ostriches, nilgai, gaurs, reticulated giraffes, southern white rhinoceroses, Przewalski's wild horses, chimpanzees, American flamingos, northern rockhopper penguins, Grévy's zebras, African wild dogs, bongos, pygmy hippopotamuses, scimitar-horned oryxes, waterbucks, African penguins, and marabou storks.

== Funding and daily shows ==
The park and ZSL receive no government funding, and rely mainly on entrance fees, memberships, its 'Fellows' and 'Patrons' scheme and various corporate sponsorships. The park takes advantage of the Gift Aid charity donation scheme.

The only animal demonstration show is the 'Birds of the World'. Educational talks also take place daily.

== Former exhibits ==
=== Sea Lion Splash ===
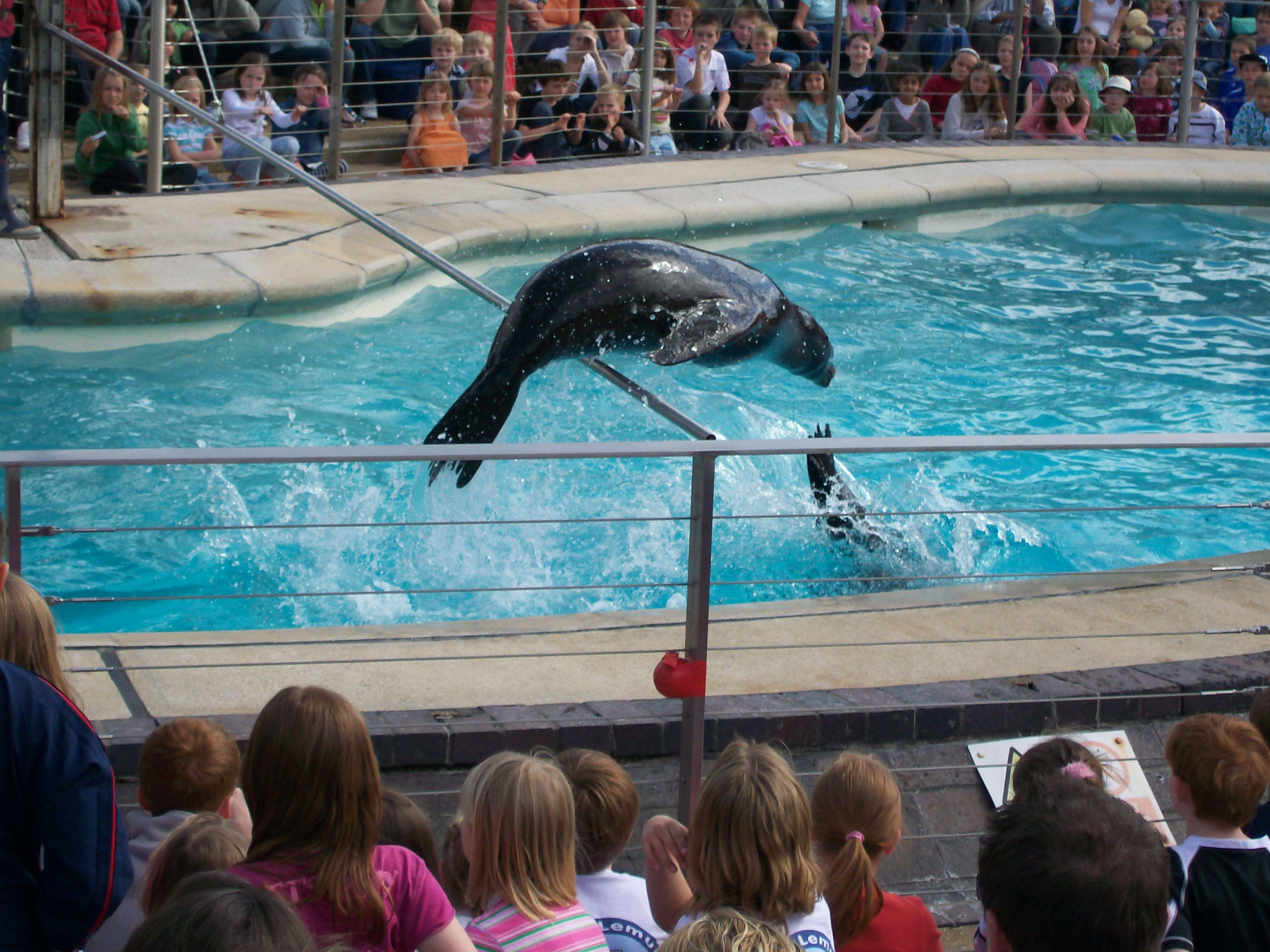
A sea lion performing in Sea Lion Splash

Formerly the zoo's Dolphin Pool, Sea Lion Splash was a daily demonstration in which the zoo's three trained California sea lions (two females named Bailey and Lara, and a male named Dom) perform tricks and stunts in their pool (referred to as the 'Splash Zone'). In June 2015, Dom and Bailey gave birth to a male sea lion called Oscar. In February 2021, the zoo's sea lions were transferred to Yorkshire Wildlife Park in South Yorkshire.

== Filming at the zoo ==
Whipsnade was one of the sets for ITV's Primeval, where a ferocious predator from the future kills a lion and three people. The zoo is one of the locations featured in BBC's Super Vets. It featured in an episode of the CBBC programme Brum in 1991, titled "Safari Park". Jamie Oliver and Sainsbury's have also used the zoo's background for a 2001 television advert. The BBC One's Merlin used parts of Whipsnade as a filming location for Season 1.

== Criticism ==
In 2002, a 20-year-old elephant named Anna died three days after giving birth to a stillborn calf. There was an allegation that the elephant suffered painful and unnecessary surgery during the birth. The zoo reported that Anna's death was due to an infection related to the stillbirth and that she did not "die in agony".

In 2021, two female European brown bears were shot and killed after escaping their enclosure during the night. The zoo was criticised for euthanizing the bears, after they used a fallen tree to escape into an adjacent enclosure where they attacked a wild boar. Sam Threadgill, director of the charity Freedom for Animals said: "It was a tragic incident, but it just highlights again why we shouldn't be keeping animals in zoos". The zoo's chief curator at the time, Malcolm Fitzpatrick, said in a message to staff, "We must quickly make decisions informed by our experience and expertise to protect our people, guests and our other animals", adding that tranquillisers were not an option as they would have taken 20 minutes to take effect.

== Chimpanzee escape ==
In September 2007, two former 'tea party' chimpanzees named Koko and Jonnie, moved from London Zoo to make way for The Gorilla Kingdom, escaped from their enclosure. Koko followed one of the keepers back to the enclosure but Jonnie started heading towards public grounds. Jonnie was shot dead by the zoo's specially trained firearms squad for fears about public safety. The zoo has said that at no point were any members of the public in danger. When asked why they did not use a tranquilliser instead, ZSL spokeswoman Alice Henchley said "It's just standard procedure, if the animal cannot be quickly and safely recaptured it will be shot. We can't be sure with a tranquilliser".

== Notes ==
- A set of panels outlining the history of the zoo is located in the Lookout Cafe in the park.
