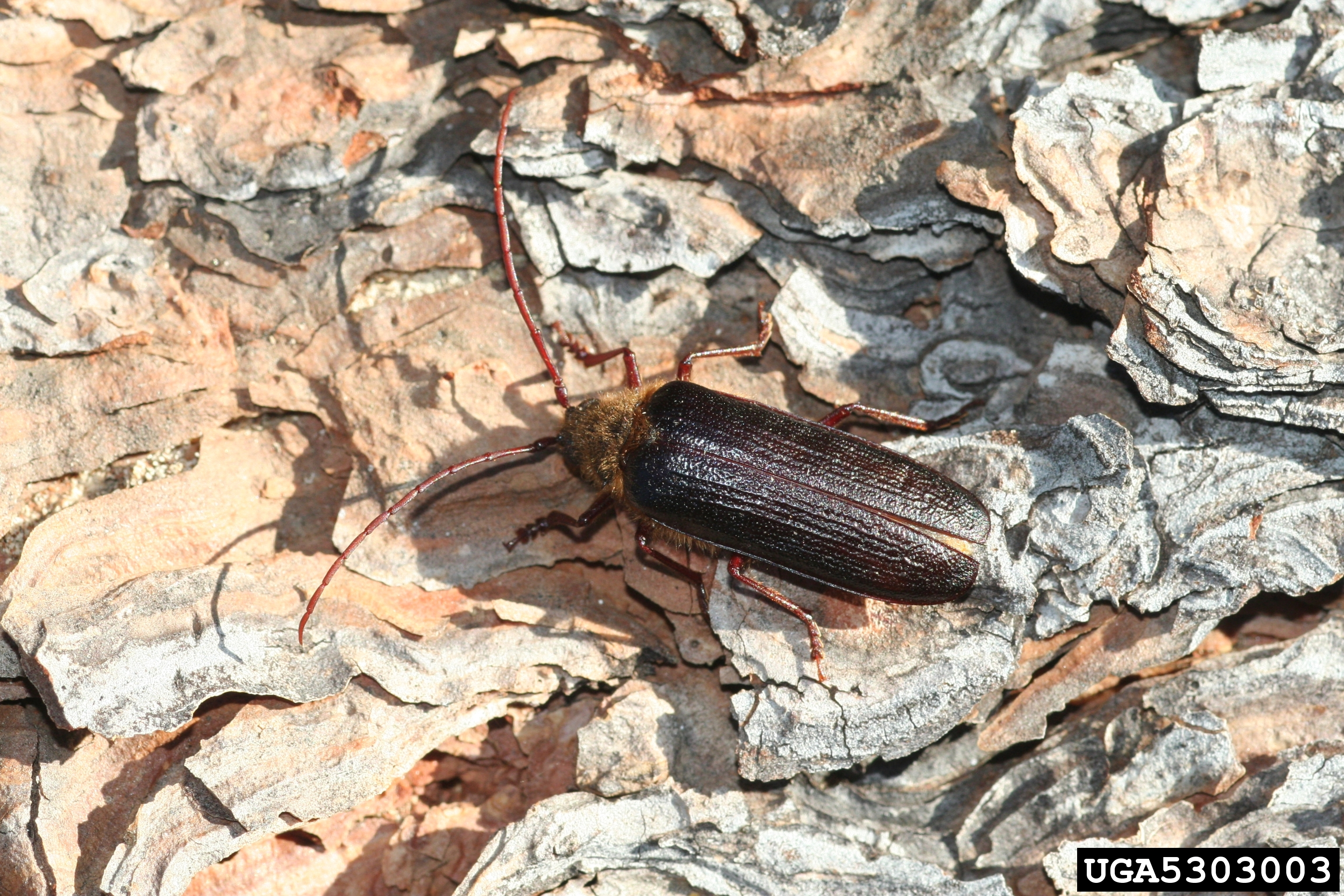
- Tragosoma depsarium

Scientific classification
- Domain: Eukaryota
- Kingdom: Animalia
- Phylum: Arthropoda
- Class: Insecta
- Order: Coleoptera
- Suborder: Polyphaga
- Infraorder: Cucujiformia
- Family: Cerambycidae
- Subfamily: Prioninae
- Tribe: Meroscelisini
- Genus: Tragosoma; Audinet-Serville, 1832

= Tragosoma =

Genus of beetles

Tragosoma is a genus of beetles in the longhorn beetle family, Cerambycidae.

== Species ==
These species belong to the genus Tragosoma:

- Tragosoma depsarium (Linnaeus, 1767)^{i c g}
- Tragosoma harrisii LeConte, 1851^{c g b}
- Tragosoma nigripenne Bates, 1892^{c g}
- Tragosoma pilosicorne Casey, 1890^{i g b}
- Tragosoma spiculum Casey, 1890^{i c g b}
- Tragosoma soror Laplante, 2017^{i c g b}

Data sources: i = ITIS, c = Catalogue of Life, g = GBIF, b = Bugguide.net
