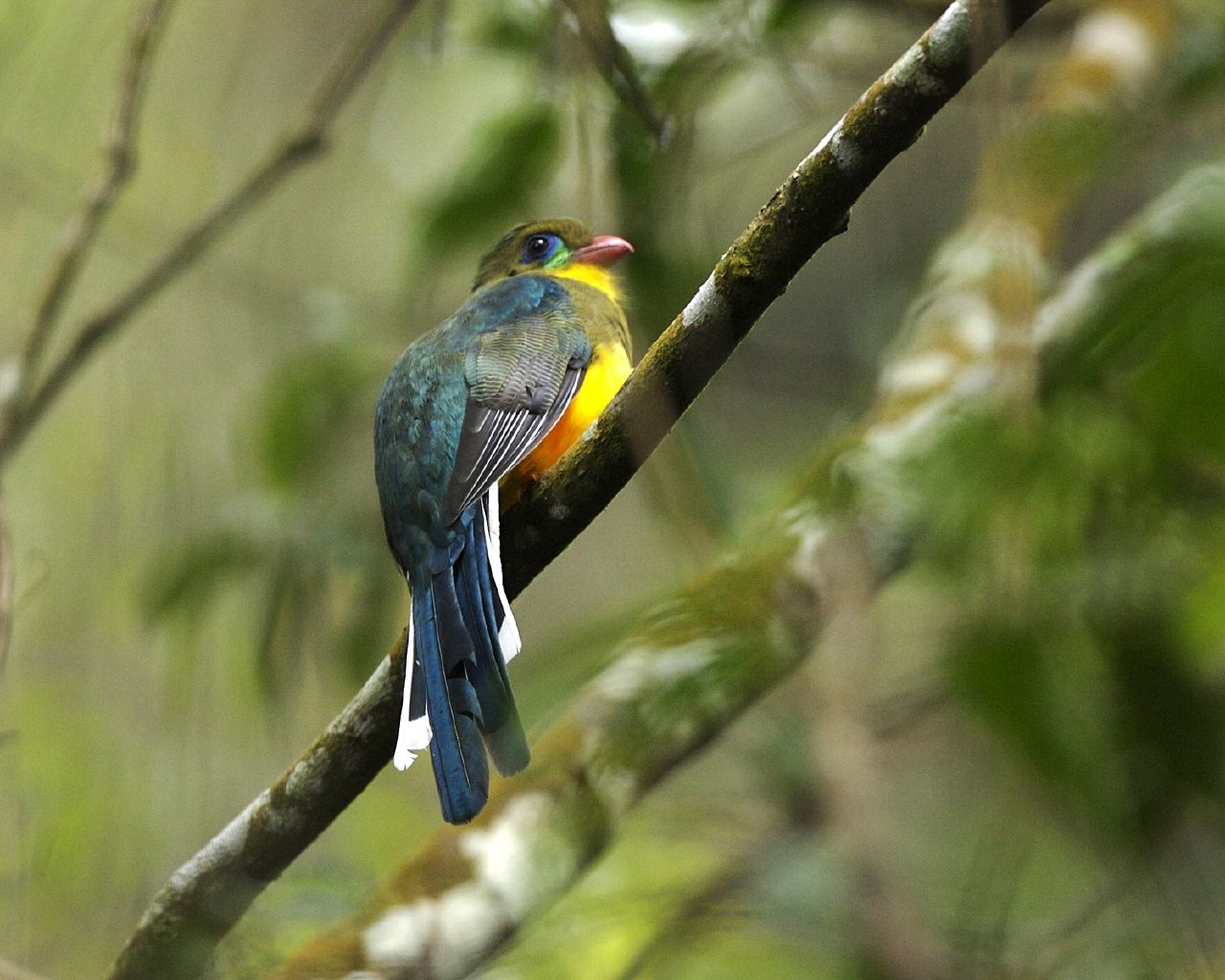

Conservation status
- Vulnerable (IUCN 3.1)

Scientific classification
- Kingdom: Animalia
- Phylum: Chordata
- Class: Aves
- Order: Trogoniformes
- Family: Trogonidae
- Genus: Apalharpactes
- Species: A. reinwardtii

Binomial name
- Apalharpactes reinwardtii (Temminck, 1822)

Synonyms
- Harpactes reinwardtii

= Javan trogon =

Species of bird

The Javan trogon (Apalharpactes reinwardtii) is a bird species in the family Trogonidae endemic to western Java, Indonesia. It was previously grouped with the Sumatran trogon as a single species, known as the blue-tailed trogon. However, differences in size, weight, and plumage have led to their classification as separate species. Both species were once included in the genus Harpactes alongside other Asian trogons, but due to differences in plumage, they have been reclassified into their own genus, Apalharpactes.

== Taxonomy ==
The Javan trogon belongs to the order Trogoniformes and the family Trogonidae. It was formerly grouped with the Sumatran trogon (Apalharpactes mackloti) under the species name Harpactes reinwardtii, commonly known as the blue-tailed trogon, first described by Coenraad Jacob Temminck in 1822.

In 2002, morphological distinctions, including differences in plumage coloration, vocalizations, and body proportions, provided sufficient evidence to split the two into separate species. Initially placed within the genus Harpactes, alongside ten other Asian trogons, this classification was based on superficial similarities and their geographical proximity on the islands of Java and Sumatra. However, recent molecular phylogenetic studies have revealed that Apalharpactes species are more closely related to African trogons of the genus Apaloderma than to their Asian counterparts. This genetic evidence prompted the reassignment of the Javan and Sumatran trogons into the distinct genus Apalharpactes, reflecting their deeper phylogenetic divergence.

== Description ==
Like other members of the family Trogonidae, the Javan trogon is a stocky bird characterized by a thick beak, vibrant plumage, and heterodactylous feet where the first and second toes point backward and the third and fourth forward. Its skin is notably thin, with feathers that are loosely attached, a trait common among trogons.

The Javan trogon displays striking coloration: iridescent green upperparts, a yellow throat and belly divided by a green breast band, and an iridescent blue tail. Its eyes range from black to brown and are set within a vivid blue eye ring. The beak varies from coral red to yellowish brown, while the legs are bright orange to orange-yellow.

It closely resembles the Sumatran trogon in overall appearance, though males can be distinguished by their green rump, in contrast to the Sumatran male’s prominent chestnut band. Morphometric differences further separate the two species: the Javan trogon possesses proportionally longer beaks and tails and is an average 34 cm in length, which is larger than the Sumatran trogon, which measures 30 cm.

== Habitat and Distribution ==
The Javan trogon is endemic to the western mountain region of the Indonesian island of Java. They are an arboreal species that occurs at elevations of 2600 to 800 meters above sea level; however, due to a lack of forest habitat below 1,000 meters, they are expected to be more common at higher elevations. There are an estimated 2,500 to 10,000 individuals within this range; however, due to limited accessibility in certain mountain regions, some populations may have been underrepresented.

They are present in the following Indonesian mountains:

- Ciwidey
- Gunung Cikuray
- Gunung Gede-Pangrango
- Gunung Halimun
- Gunung Limbung
- Gunung Papandayan
- Gunung Patuha-Tilu
- Gunung Salak
- Gunung Wayang
- Kencana
- Masigit
- Mt. Slamet
- Mt. Merapi

== Behavior ==
=== Vocalization ===
The Javan trogon produces a penetrating hoarse “chierr, chierr” or loud “turrr” call, which sets them apart from the species of Harpactes, which all reuse “Kau” and “Klew” notes in their songs and calls. It has not yet been recorded whether or not it can also produce a similar song to the unique one produced by its sister species, the Sumatran trogon.

=== Diet ===
The Javan trogon usually quickly pursue startled flying insects and sometimes pursue insects on leaves or branches by flying rapidly a short distance away and then hovering to capture their prey. Their primary diet is south east long-horned beetles and cicadas, and figs, but they also are known to eat true bugs, grasshoppers, butterfly caterpillars, and stick insects. Like other Trogons, they are known to join other species of birds in flocks to rouse more insects.

=== Reproduction ===
There is limited research conducted on trogonid reproductive behavior; around 25% of all trogon species have at least some information available related to mating and their eggs. The Javan trogon falls into the category of trogonids with little to no information on their reproduction capabilities. They have been recorded breeding from April to June during Java’s dry season and in October and December during the rainy season. They have also been observed in groups as large as 5 individuals, demonstrating potential familial grouping. They can lay 1 to 2 eggs per clutch, with evidence of possibly 3 eggs. Fatal egg binding was also reported in the genus Apalharpactes.

== Conservation ==
The Javan Trogon is classified as Vulnerable under IUCN criteria C2a(i), with an estimated population of 2,500–9,999 individuals and a declining trend though surveys have recently expanded its known distribution from three mountains to nine, with consistent encounter rates across sites.

Agricultural encroachment, tourism development, and geothermal and logging projects all contribute to forest loss, degradation, and fragmentation and pose ongoing threats to the Javan trogon’s habitat. Although forest loss has slowed since 2000, transitional elevation montane forests remain fragmented and isolated, and lowland forest in the region covers only 5,234 km².

Current conservation actions underway include protection within Gunung Halimun and Gunung Gede–Pangrango National Parks. Proposed measures include further surveys to clarify distribution, designation of new protected areas, and collaboration with local stakeholders to mitigate development impacts.
