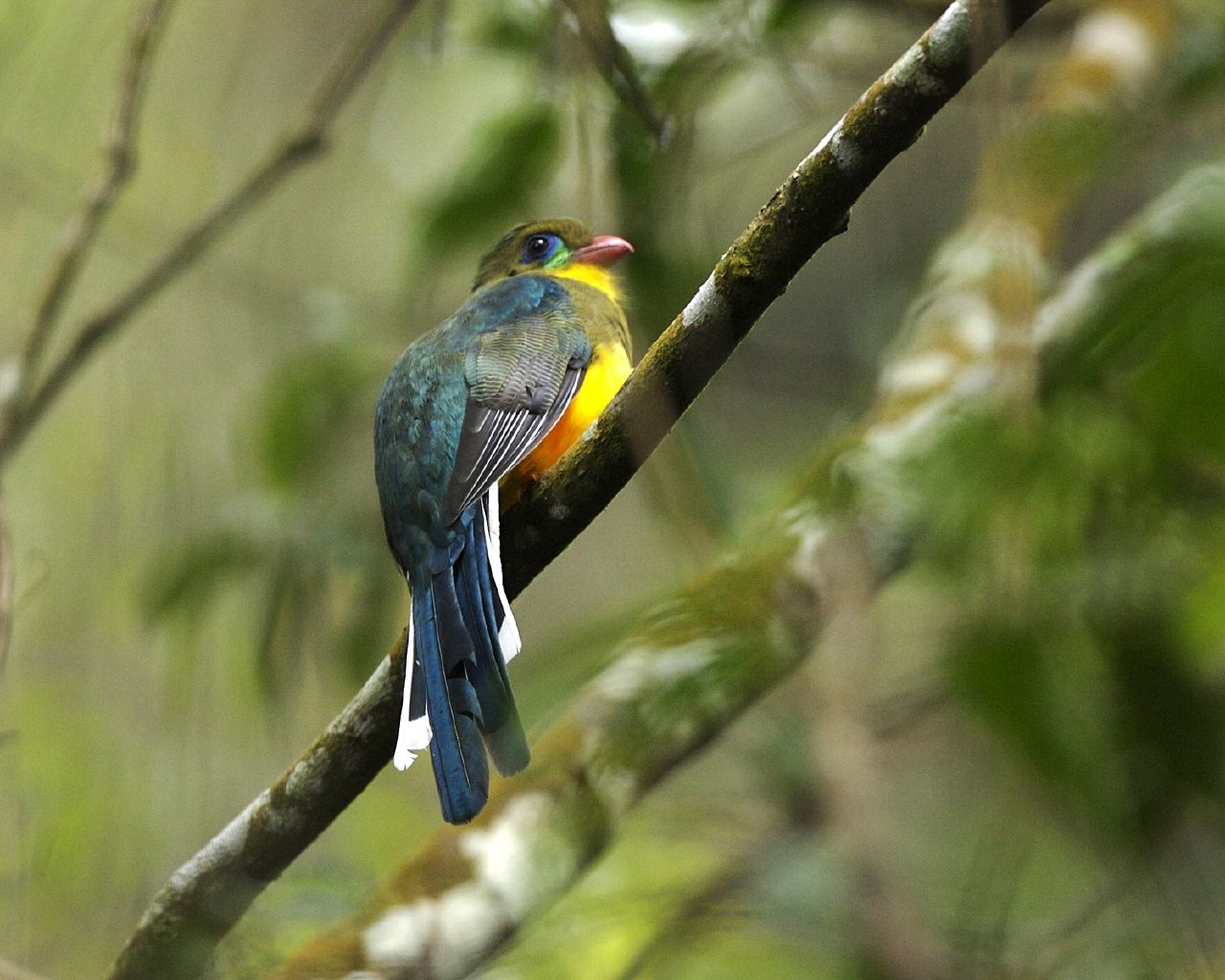
- Javan trogon (Apalharpactes reinwardtii)

Scientific classification
- Kingdom: Animalia
- Phylum: Chordata
- Class: Aves
- Order: Trogoniformes
- Family: Trogonidae
- Genus: Apalharpactes; Bonaparte, 1854

Type species
- Trogon reinwardtii Temminck, 1822

= Apalharpactes =

Genus of birds

Apalharpactes is a genus of birds in the family Trogonidae. They are restricted to humid highland forest on the Indonesian islands of Java and Sumatra. Unlike all other Asian trogons, their plumage is mainly green above and yellow below. Compared to most trogons, the sexual dimorphism is relatively small. The two species in the genus resemble each other, but A. reinwardtii is larger than A. mackloti, and the male A. mackloti has a chestnut rump-patch, which A. reinwardtii lacks. They feed on arthropods, small lizards and fruit.

== Taxonomy ==
The members of Apalharpactes are sometimes placed in the genus Harpactes instead. However a 2010 study found that the two genera are actually distantly related and thus valid.

The two species of Apalharpactes were formerly treated as conspecific under the name red-billed trogon or blue-tailed trogon (Apalharpactes reinwardtii, with mackloti as a subspecies), but are better treated as separate species.

Image	Scientific name	Common name	Distribution
	Apalharpactes mackloti	Sumatran trogon	Sumatra in Indonesia.
	Apalharpactes reinwardtii	Javan trogon	Western Java in Indonesia.
