= Biotropica, les jardins animaliers =

- Interactive map of Biotropica, les jardins animaliers
- 49°18′19″N 1°12′58″E
- Date opened: 2012
- Location: Val-de-Reuil, France
- Land area: 10 hectares
- No. of animals: 2000
- No. of species: 200
- Annual visitors: 200,000
- Memberships: European Association of Zoos and Aquaria (EAZA) & The French Association of Zoological Parks (AFdPZ)
- Website: www.biotropica.fr

Biotropica, les jardins animaliers is a zoological park in the commune of Val-de-Reuil.

The park covers an area of 10 hectares (25 acres). It features a 5000m2 tropical greenhouse. It is home to about 2000 animals, and features around 200 species.

The Park is open every day, including bank holidays. It receives approximately 200,000 visitors per year.

== History ==
The zoo opened in September 2012 under the guidance of the owners of Zoo de Cerza and was originally called Serre zoologique Biotropica. In 2015 it changed its name to Les Jardins Animaliers Biotropica.

== Membership ==
The park is one of the members of The French Association of Zoological Parks (AFdPZ) and the European Association of Zoos and Aquaria EAZA.
