= Hermival-les-Vaux =

- Commune
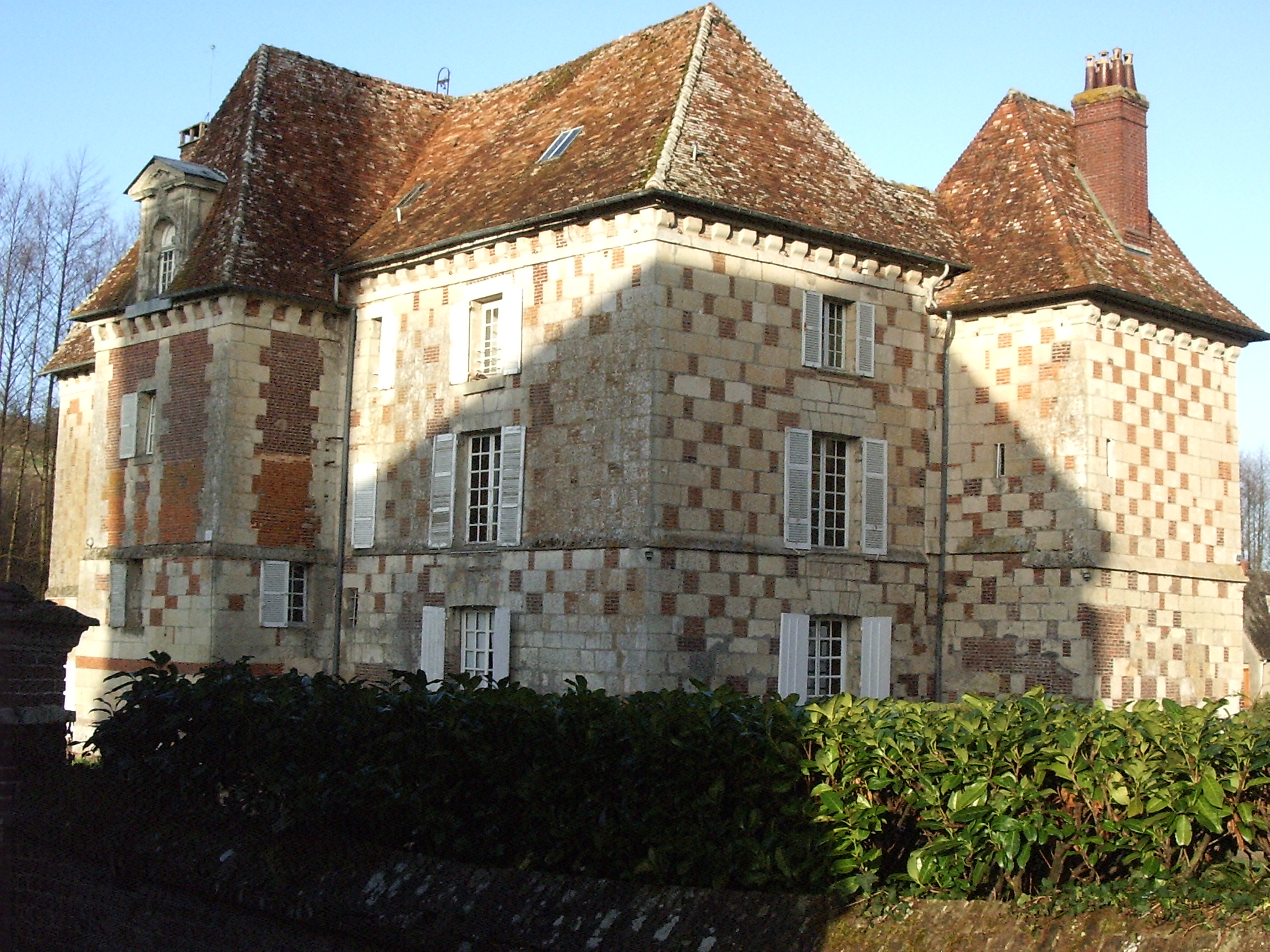
- Castle of Hermival-les-Vaux
- Location of Hermival-les-Vaux
- Location within France Location within Normandy
- Coordinates: 49°10′14″N 0°17′01″E
- Country: France
- Region: Normandy
- Department: Calvados
- Arrondissement: Lisieux
- Canton: Pont-l'Évêque
- Intercommunality: CA Lisieux Normandie

Government
  - Mayor (2020–2026): Gérard Beaudoin
- Area^{1}: 13.76 km^{2} (5.31 sq mi)
- Elevation: 150 m (490 ft)
- Highest elevation: 166 m (545 ft)
- Lowest elevation: 52 m (171 ft)
- Population (2023): 861
  - Density: 62.6/km^{2} (162/sq mi)
- Time zone: UTC+01:00 (CET)
  - Summer (DST): UTC+02:00 (CEST)
- INSEE/Postal code: 14326 /14100
- ^{1} French Land Register data, which excludes lakes, ponds, glaciers > 1 km^{2} (0.386 sq mi or 247 acres) and river estuaries.

Hermival-les-Vaux (French pronunciation: [ɛʁmival le vo]) is a commune in the Calvados department in the Normandy region in northwestern France.

== Population ==
Historical population
Year	Pop.	±% p.a.
1968	395	—
1975	526	+4.18%
1982	518	−0.22%
1990	673	+3.33%
1999	760	+1.36%
2007	845	+1.33%
2012	841	−0.09%
2017	813	−0.67%
2023	861	+0.96%
Source: INSEE

== Points of interest ==
- Zoo de Cerza is a zoo covering 70 hectares that features a 120 different species of animal is based here.

=== National heritage sites ===
- Château à Hermival-les-Vaux is a seventeenth century chateau that was classed as a Monument historique in 1927.

== See also ==
- Communes of the Calvados department
