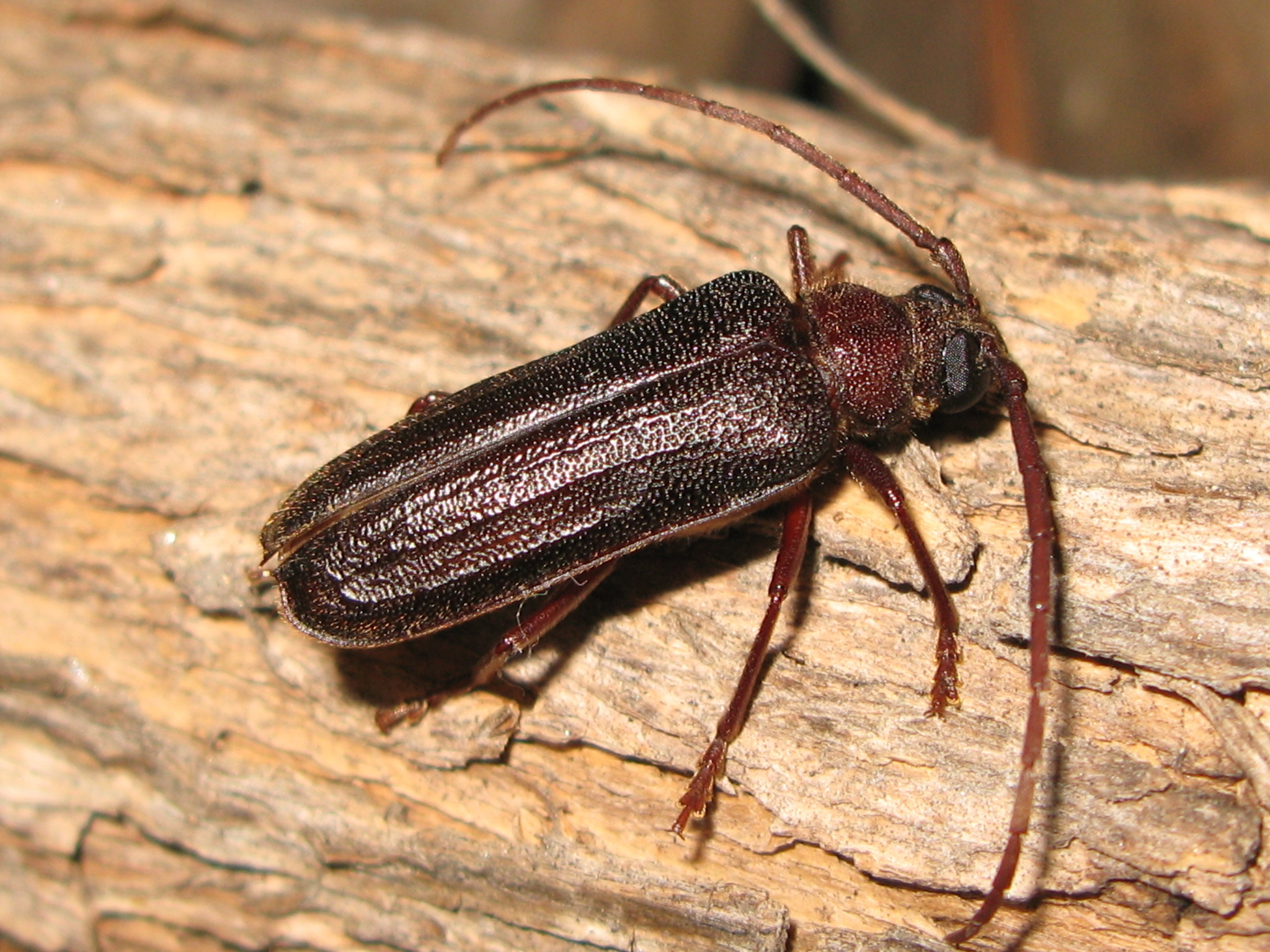

Scientific classification
- Kingdom: Animalia
- Phylum: Arthropoda
- Class: Insecta
- Order: Coleoptera
- Suborder: Polyphaga
- Infraorder: Cucujiformia
- Family: Cerambycidae
- Genus: Tragosoma
- Species: T. pilosicorne

Binomial name
- Tragosoma pilosicorne Casey, 1890

= Tragosoma pilosicorne =

Species of beetle

Tragosoma pilosicorne is a species of long-horned beetle in the family Cerambycidae. It is found in North America.
