= William Windsor (goat) =

Cashmere goat

William Windsor I
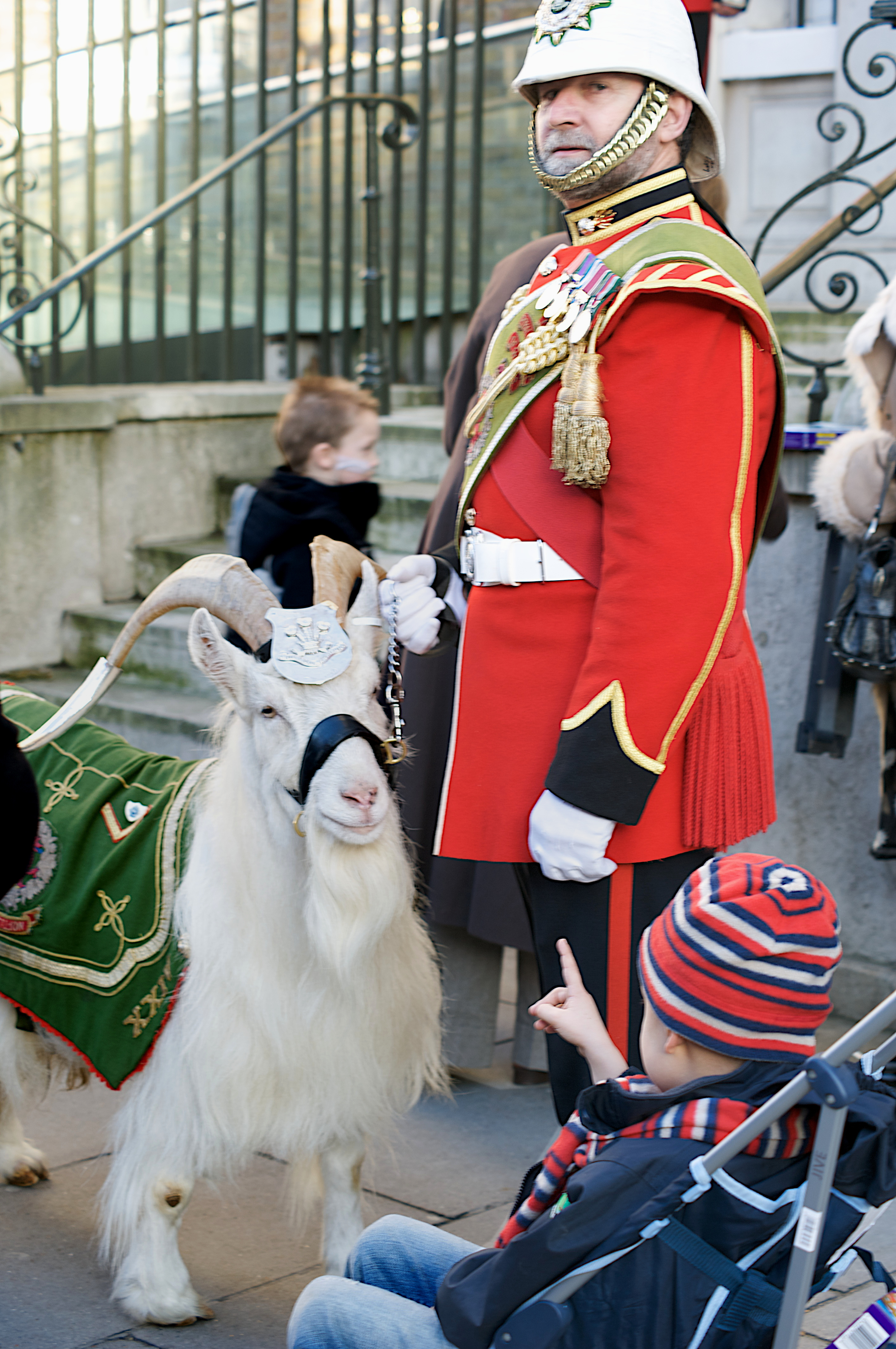
- Born: 2000 (25–26 years old); Whipsnade Zoo
- Military career
- Allegiance: United Kingdom
- Branch: British Army
- Service years: 2001–2009
- Rank: Lance corporal
- Nickname: Billy
- Service number: 25232301
- Units: 1st Battalion, the Royal Welsh
- Retirement: Whipsnade Zoo

William "Billy" Windsor I is a cashmere goat who served as a lance corporal in the 1st Battalion, the Royal Welsh, an infantry battalion of the British Army. He served as a lance corporal from 2001 until 2009, except for a three-month period in 2006 when he was demoted to fusilier, after inappropriate behaviour during the Queen's Official Birthday celebrations while deployed on active duty with the battalion on Cyprus. He retired to Whipsnade Zoo in May 2009.

His young replacement is known as William Windsor II.

== History ==
The tradition of having goats in the military originated in 1775, when a wild goat walked onto the battlefield in Boston during the American Revolutionary War and led the Welsh regimental colours at the end of the Battle of Bunker Hill. Another Welsh military goat, Taffy IV, served in the First World War. Taffy, of the 2nd Battalion, Welsh Regiment, is officially recorded as "The Regimental Goat". He embarked on the war on 13 August 1914 and saw action in the Retreat from Mons, the First Battle of Ypres (including the Battle of Gheluvelt), and the Battles of Festubert and Givenchy, before dying on 20 January 1915. He was posthumously awarded the 1914 Star, British War Medal and the Victory Medal.

The royal goat herd was originally obtained from Mohammad Shah Qajar, Shah of Persia from 1834 to 1848, when he presented them to Queen Victoria as a gift in 1837 upon her accession to the throne.

The herd thrived on Llandudno's Great Orme; by 2001 they reached a population of 250 and were in danger of running out of food. Following complaints about goats wandering into people's gardens, the council rejected proposals for a cull, deciding to use a combination of rehoming and birth control. RSPCA marksmen tranquillised nannies and inserted contraceptive progesterone implants to control the numbers of the genetically unique breed. By 2007, 85 goats had been relocated to areas including Kent, Yorkshire, the Brecon Beacons, and Somerset, but further efforts were interrupted by an outbreak of foot-and-mouth disease.

== William Windsor I ==
Billy, a Kashmir goat, is descended from the same royal bloodline as the original herd, but was not selected from the wild population; he was born in Whipsnade Zoo. He was presented to the regiment by Queen Elizabeth II in 2001. The tradition is not new: since 1844, the British monarchy has presented an unbroken series of Kashmir goats to the Royal Welch Fusiliers from the Crown's own royal herd.

Billy—Army number 25232301—is "not a mascot, but a ranking member of the regiment", according to the BBC. Since joining in 2001, he has performed duties overseas, and has paraded before royalty. His primary duty was to march at the head of the battalion on all ceremonial duties. He was present for every parade in which the regiment participated. Billy's full-time handler was Lance Corporal Ryan Arthur, who carried the title of "Goat Major".

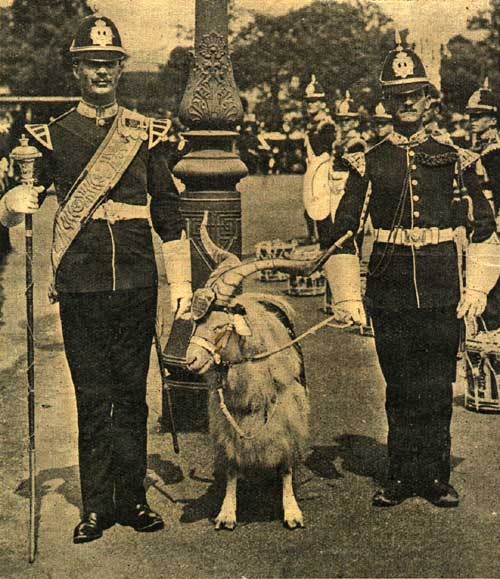
Another regimental goat: Taffy IV, of the 2nd Battalion of the Welsh Regiment, was on active duty in France during World War I, participating in the Retreat from Mons, the First Battle of Ypres and other famous battles. He was awarded the 1914 Star.

=== Temporary demotion ===
On 16 June 2006, a parade was held to celebrate Queen Elizabeth II's 80th birthday, at the Episkopi base near Limassol, Cyprus on the Mediterranean island's south coast. Invited dignitaries included the ambassadors of Spain, the Netherlands, and Sweden and the Argentine commander of United Nations' forces on Cyprus.

The deployment to Cyprus with the 1st Battalion was Billy's first overseas posting, and despite being ordered to keep in line, he refused to obey. He failed to keep in step and tried to headbutt a drummer. The goat major, Lance Corporal Dai Davies, 22, from Neath, South Wales, was unable to keep him under control.

Billy was charged with "unacceptable behaviour", "lack of decorum" and "disobeying a direct order", and had to appear before his commanding officer, Lieutenant-Colonel Huw James. Following a disciplinary hearing, he was demoted to fusilier.

A Canadian animal rights group protested to the British Army, stating that he was merely "acting the goat", and should be reinstated. Three months later, on 20 September at the same parade ground, Billy regained his rank during the Alma Day parade which celebrates the Royal Welsh victory in the Crimean War. Captain Simon Clarke said, "Billy performed exceptionally well, he has had all summer to reflect on his behaviour at the Queen's birthday and clearly earned the rank he deserves".

Billy received his promotion from the colonel of the Royal Welsh Regiment, Brigadier Roderick Porter. As a result of regaining his rank, he also regained his membership of the corporals' mess.

Billy is not the first goat in the army to have troubles. At one time a royal goat was "prostituted" by being offered for stud services by the regiment's serving goat major to a Wrexham goat breeder. First charged with lèse-majesté, the goat major was ultimately court-martialled under the lesser charge of "disrespect to an officer" and reduced in rank. The goat major claimed he did it out of compassion for the goat, but this failed to impress the court. Another royal fusilier goat earned the nickname "the rebel", after he butted a colonel while he was stooped over fixing his uniform's trouser-strap. The incident was described as a "disgraceful act of insubordination."

=== Retirement ===
On 20 May 2009, following 8 years of distinguished service, Billy retired due to his age. Billy was taken to Whipsnade Zoo in Bedfordshire, where keepers say he had an easy life at the Hullabazoo Farm.

== William Windsor II ==
In order to replace Billy, thirty members of 1st Battalion set off to Great Orme in Llandudno on 15 June 2009 at 03:00, hoping to catch the feral goats in a docile state. A team led by Lieutenant-Colonel Nick Lock (Commanding Officer) included the goat major and several veterinarians. Army spokesman Gavin O’Connor said, "We are looking for a goat which is calm under pressure and a team player." During the selection of a replacement goat, the battalion helped to start an alternative vaccine method of birth control among the herd, since hormone implants that were previously employed to control numbers are no longer available.

With some difficulty, a five-month-old was chosen, and assigned army number 25142301—which represents regiment number 2514, 23rd Regiment of Foot (the original name of the Royal Welsh Fusiliers), and 01 denoting the 1st Battalion. The new goat will also be called William Windsor, beginning as a fusilier while being trained for military life. He will receive a ration of two cigarettes per day, which he eats, but will not be permitted Guinness (for iron) until he is older.

== See also ==
- Military animal
- Military mascot
- Nils Olav, mascot penguin
- Bill the Goat, United States Naval Academy mascot
- Wojtek (bear)
- Sergeant Bill
