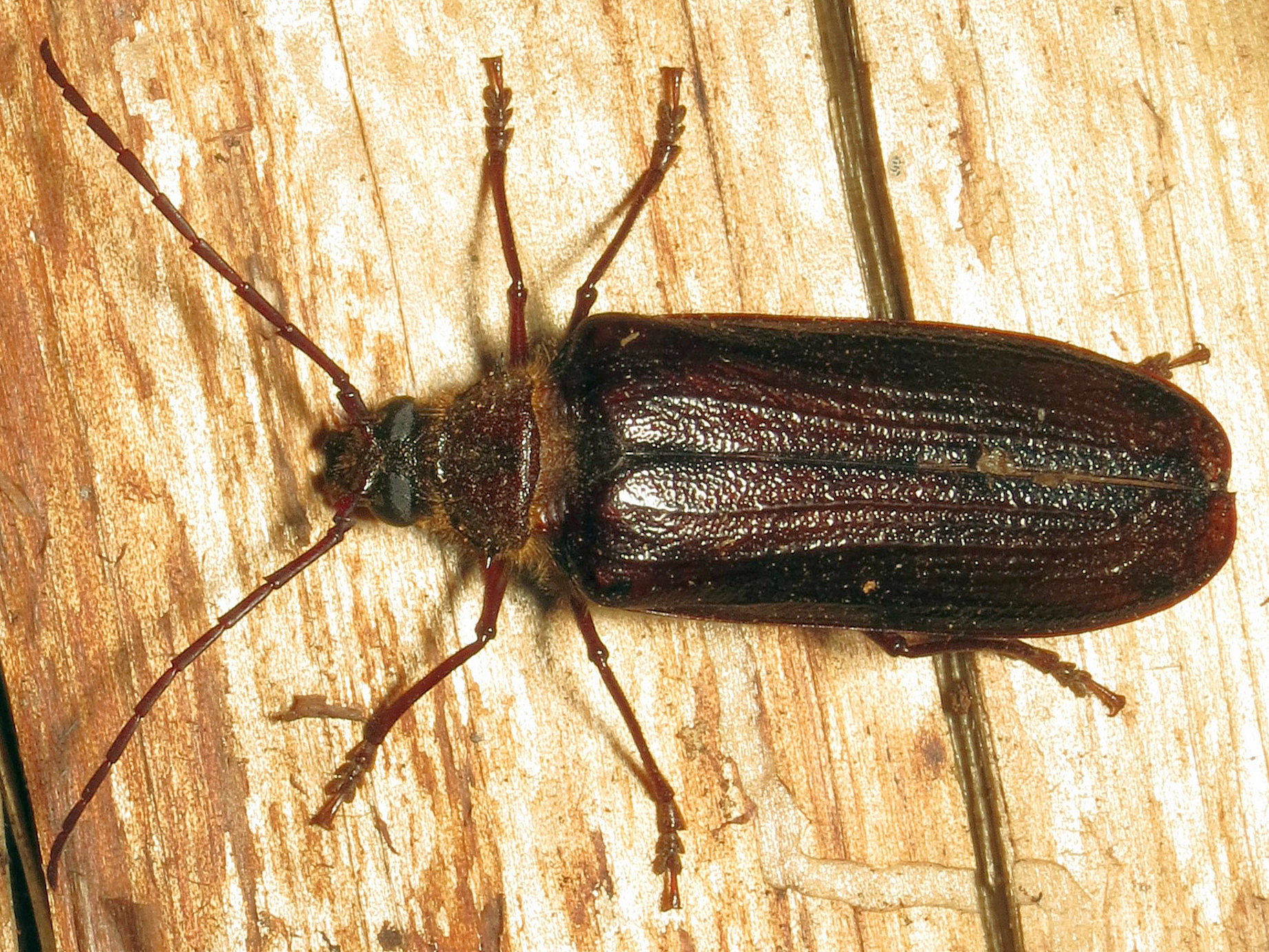

Scientific classification
- Domain: Eukaryota
- Kingdom: Animalia
- Phylum: Arthropoda
- Class: Insecta
- Order: Coleoptera
- Suborder: Polyphaga
- Infraorder: Cucujiformia
- Family: Cerambycidae
- Genus: Tragosoma
- Species: T. harrisii

Binomial name
- Tragosoma harrisii LeConte, 1851

Synonyms
- Tragosoma parvicollis Casey, 1899; Tragosoma repens Casey, 1924; Tragosoma sodalis Casey, 1899

= Tragosoma harrisii =

Species of beetle

Tragosoma harrisii is a species of long-horned beetle in the family Cerambycidae.
