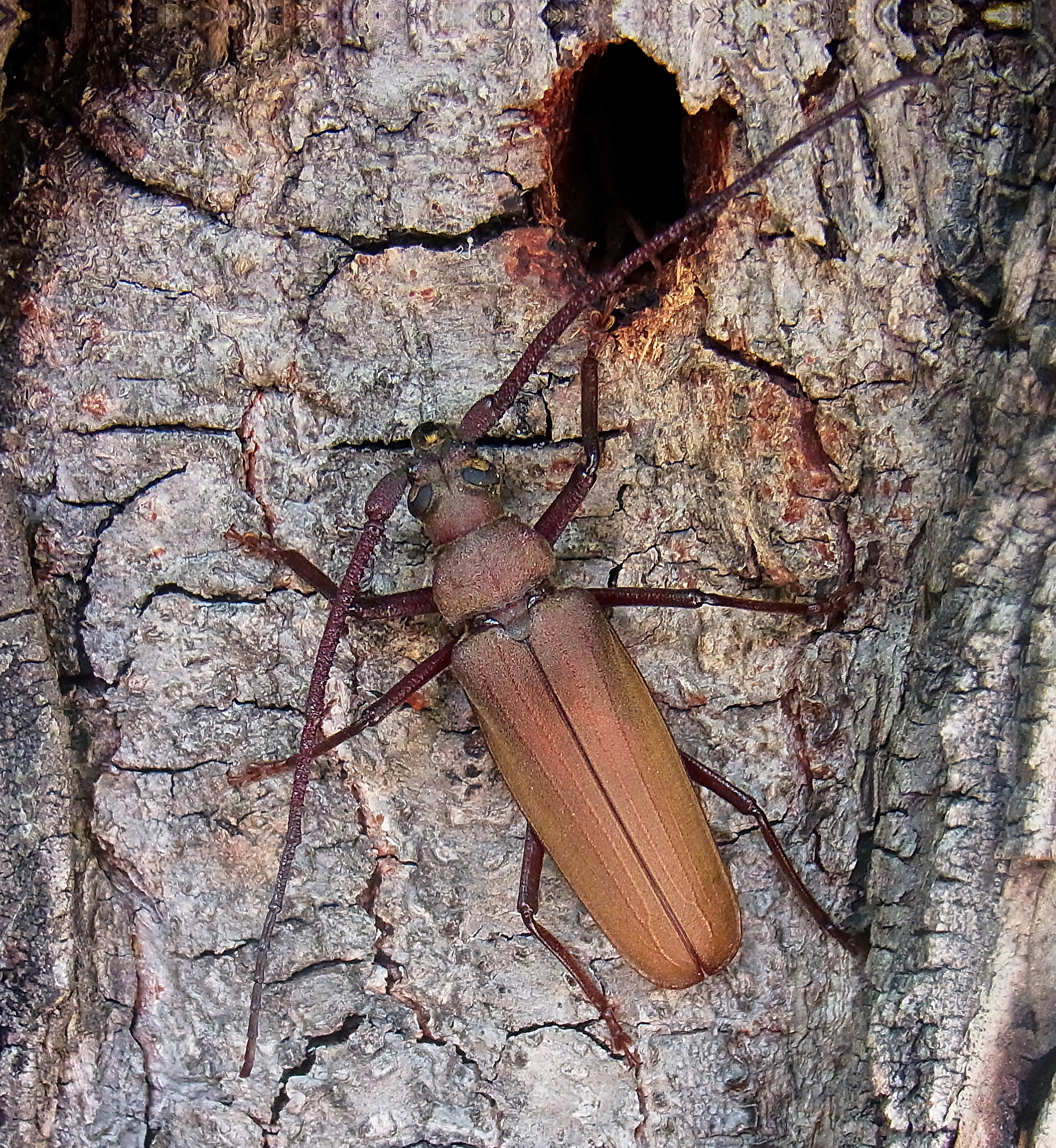
- Top view

Scientific classification
- Kingdom: Animalia
- Phylum: Arthropoda
- Clade: Pancrustacea
- Class: Insecta
- Order: Coleoptera
- Suborder: Polyphaga
- Infraorder: Cucujiformia
- Family: Cerambycidae
- Genus: Aegosoma
- Species: A. scabricorne

Binomial name
- Aegosoma scabricorne (Scopoli, 1763)

Synonyms
- List: Cerambyx scabricornis Scopoli, 1763; Cerambyx eques Voet, 1778 (Unav.); Megopis (Aegosoma) scabricornis (Scopoli, 1763); Megopis scabricornis (Scopoli, 1763); Aegosoma scabricornis (Scopoli, 1763) (misspelling); Oegosoma scabricorne (Scopoli, 1763) (misspelling)

= Aegosoma scabricorne =

Species of beetle

Aegosoma scabricorne is a species of long-horned beetles belonging to the family Cerambycidae.

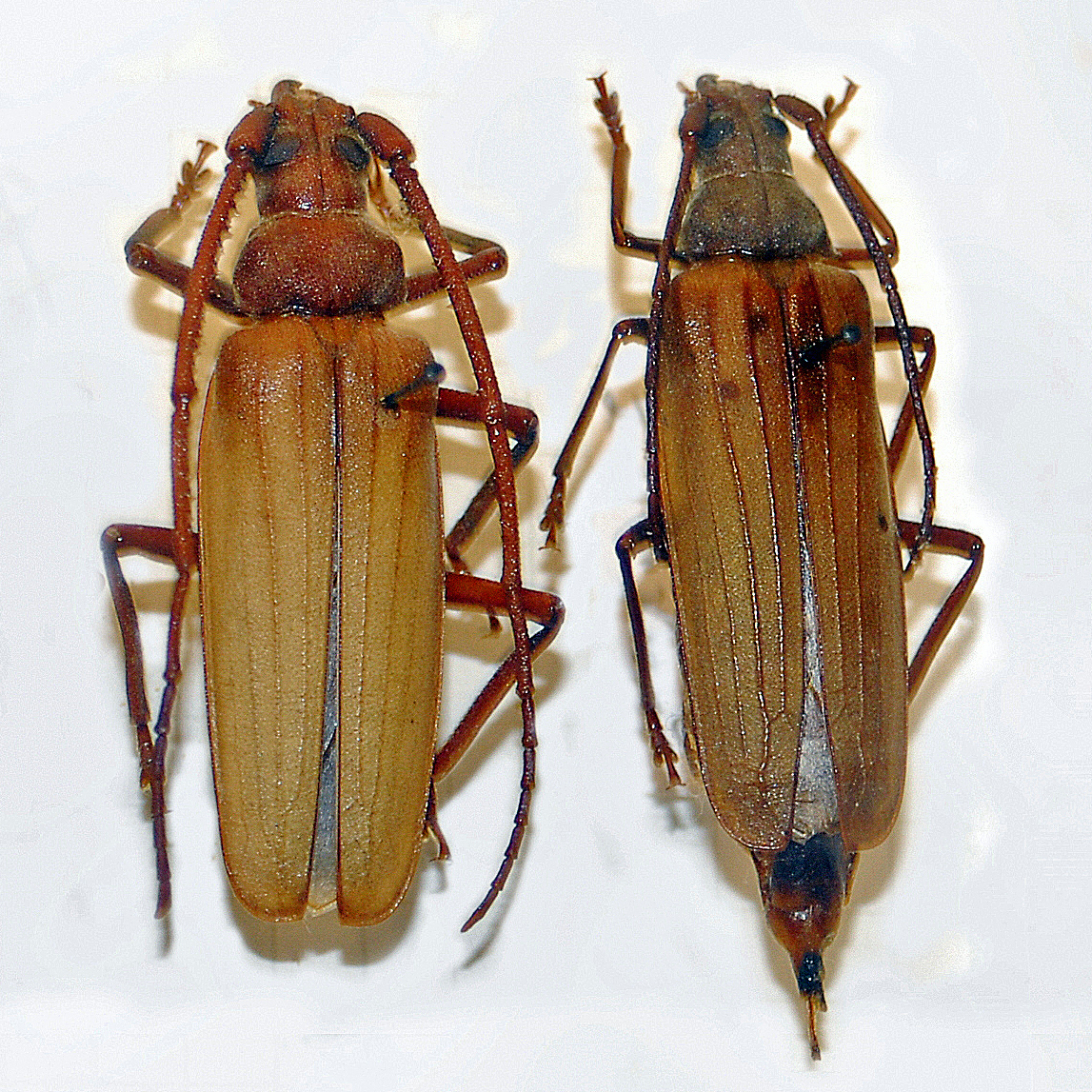
Aegosoma scabricorne, male and female. Museum specimen

== Description ==
Aegosoma scabricorne can reach a length of 25–52 millimetres (0.98–2.05 in). It is one of the biggest long-horned beetles in Europe. Body is elongated, finely pubescent, of a reddish yellow color. Head is narrowed behind the eyes. Antennae are composed by 11 segments, rough in the male. Prothorax is narrowed forward, obtusely dentate at the basal angle. Elytra show two weak longitudinal ribs. In males the antennae reach the extremity of the body, while in the females they are a little shorter than the body. The abdomen is glabrous, with a protruding oviduct.

== Distribution ==
This species is present in central and southern Europe, Asia (Japan, China, Indonesia ..) and in the Middle East (Iran, Caucasus).

== Biology ==
Adults can be found from June to August. These long-horned beetles are polyphagous in various deciduous trees (Juglans, Castania, Corylus, Populus, Platanus, Tilia, Malus). Larvae live in the trunk of old trees. Life cycle lasts at least three years.
