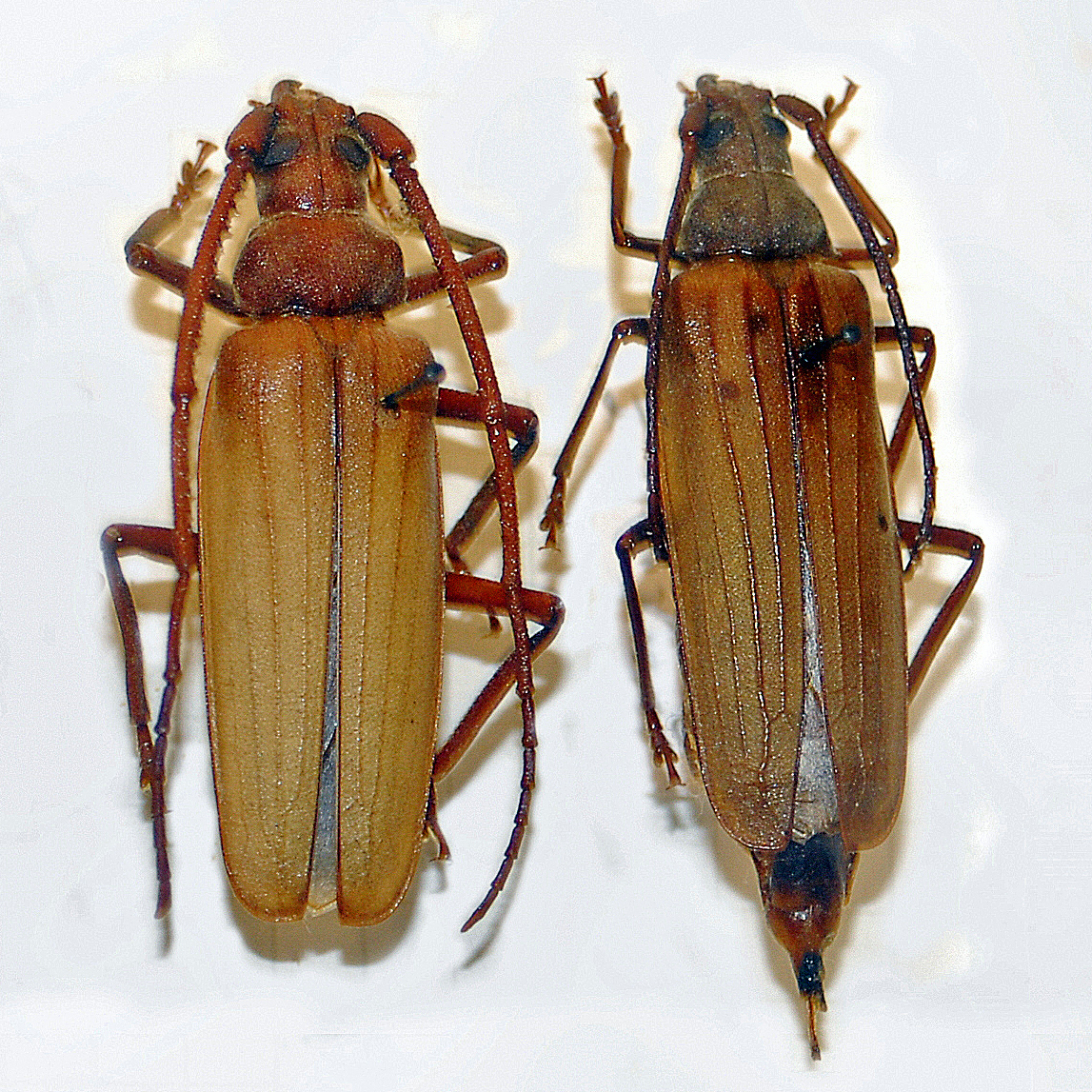
- Aegosoma scabricorne

Scientific classification
- Kingdom: Animalia
- Phylum: Arthropoda
- Clade: Pancrustacea
- Class: Insecta
- Order: Coleoptera
- Suborder: Polyphaga
- Infraorder: Cucujiformia
- Family: Cerambycidae
- Subfamily: Prioninae
- Tribe: Aegosomatini
- Genus: Aegosoma; Audinet-Serville, 1832

= Aegosoma =

Genus of beetles

Aegosoma is a genus of long-horned beetles belonging to the family Cerambycidae.

== Species ==
The following species are recognised in the genus Aegosoma:

- Aegosoma annulicorne Komiya, 2001
- Aegosoma cuneicorne Komiya, 2000
- Aegosoma doi Drumont & Ivanov, 2016
- Aegosoma dorei Drumont et al, 2018
- Aegosoma george Do, 2015
- Aegosoma giganteum Lansberge, 1884
- Aegosoma guerryi Lameere, 1915
- Aegosoma hainanense Gahan, 1900
- Aegosoma ivanovi Danilevsky, 2011
- Aegosoma katsurai Komiya, 2000
- Aegosoma kusamai Komiya, 1999
- Aegosoma musaamani Drumont, Do & Bosuang, 2013
- Aegosoma ornaticolle White, 1853
- Aegosoma osseum Aurivillius, 1897
- Aegosoma pallidum Komiya & Drumont, 2012
- Aegosoma pseudornaticolle Ripaille & Drumont, 2017
- Aegosoma scabricorne Scopoli, 1763
- Aegosoma sinicum White, 1853
- Aegosoma xentoc Do & Drumont, 2014
