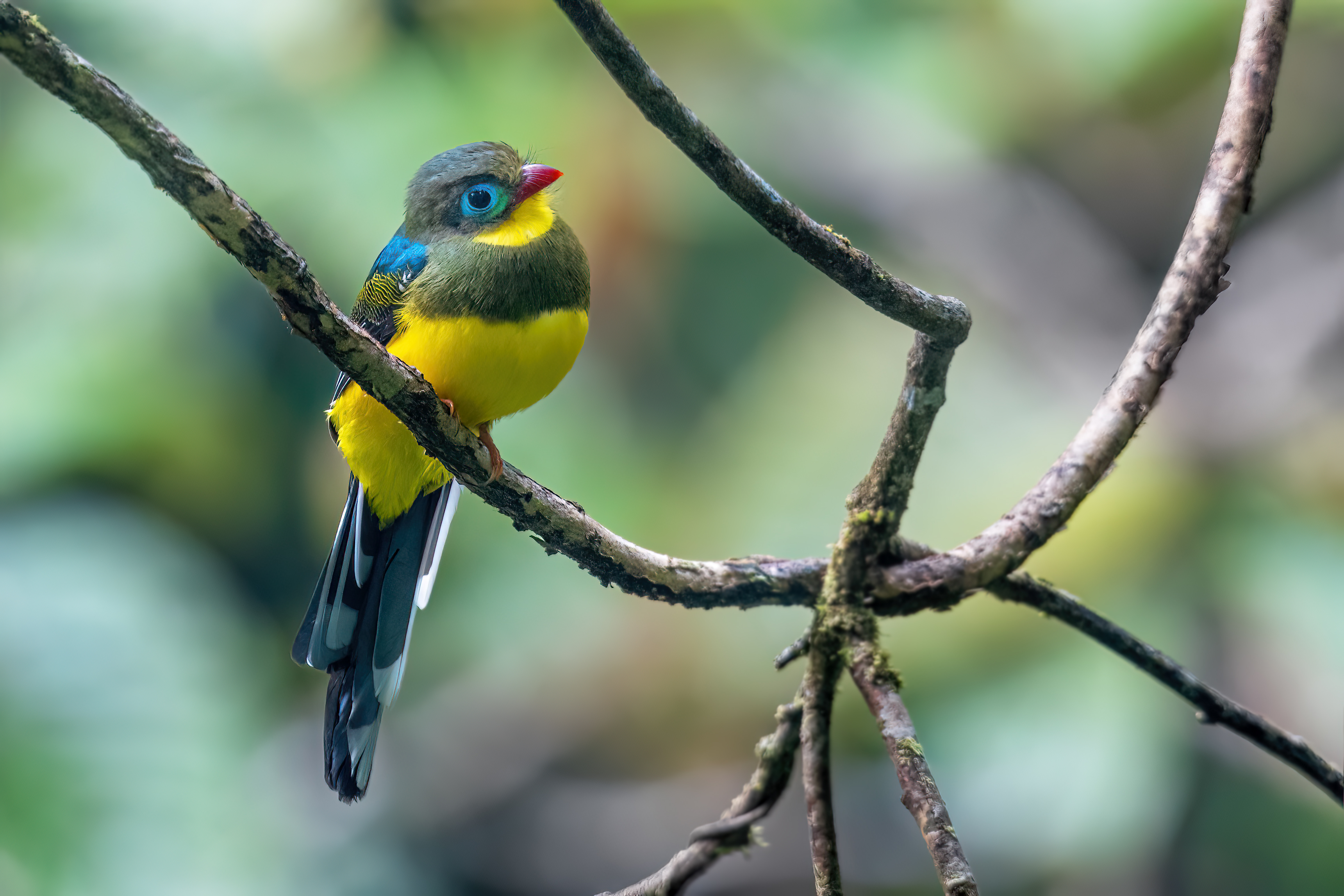
- Male

Conservation status
- Least Concern (IUCN 3.1)

Scientific classification
- Kingdom: Animalia
- Phylum: Chordata
- Class: Aves
- Order: Trogoniformes
- Family: Trogonidae
- Genus: Apalharpactes
- Species: A. mackloti

Binomial name
- Apalharpactes mackloti (Müller, 1836)

Synonyms
- Harpactes mackloti

= Sumatran trogon =

Species of bird

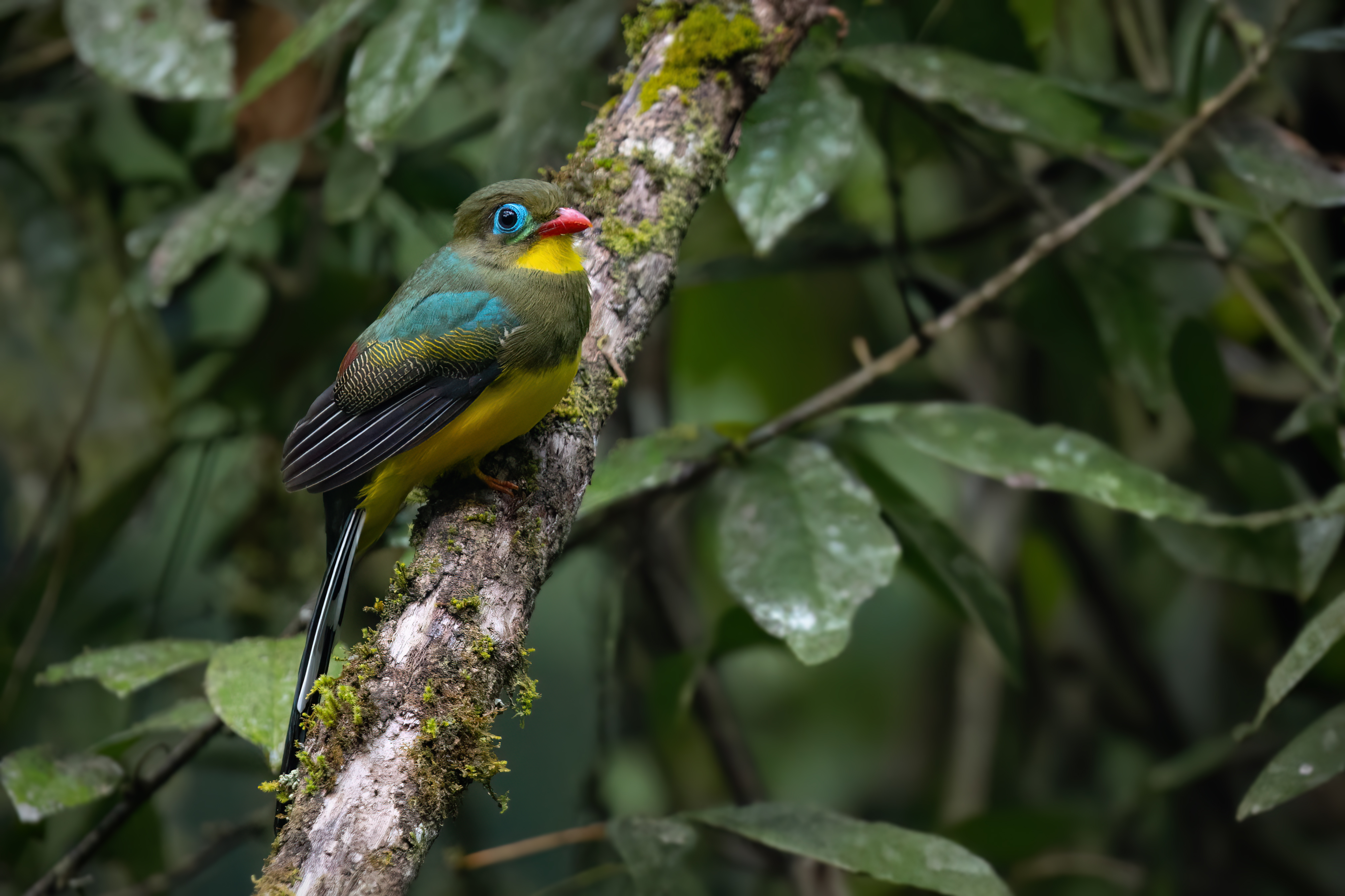
Perched on a branch showing a good view of the green upper parts, red bill, and blue exposed skin around the eye.

The Sumatran trogon (Apalharpactes mackloti) is a species of bird in the family Trogonidae. It was formerly considered conspecific with the Javan trogon under the common name blue-tailed trogon.

It is endemic to the Indonesian island of Sumatra. Its natural habitat is subtropical or tropical moist montane forest. The 12 species of Asian trogons inhabit forests throughout the southern Asian mainland and the Greater Sunda and Philippine islands. No trogons are present on the Sundaic island of Palawan, and none have succeeded in colonizing islands east of Wallace's Line.

== Description ==
The Sumatran trogon is 30 cm (12 in) from tip of the bill to tip of the tail with bluish-green upper parts and a yellow throat and belly. It has a patch of exposed blue skin around the eyes, a red beak, orange feet, and a long, iridescent, blue tail. The males have a characteristic thick chestnut coloured band on their rump, and thicker, more defined barring on the wing panels.

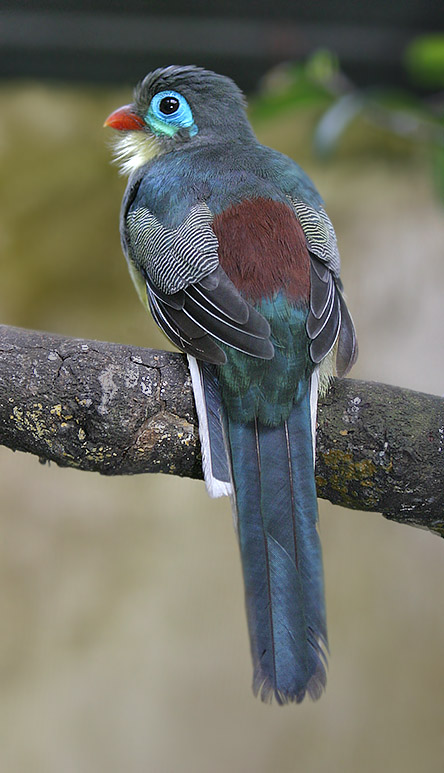
The characteristic chestnut band on the rump and thicker barring on the wing panel of the male

The Sumatran trogon closely resembles the Javan trogon (Apalharpactes reinwardtii) (the two populations were previously considered a single species), however the Javan trogon is nearly 30% larger than the Sumatran trogon is, with thicker barring on the wing panels. The two species do not co-occur (both being limited to the islands of their namesakes). Together, the Apalharpactes are the only Asian trogons to have iridescence in their plumage.

== Taxonomy ==
All species of Asian trogons used to be placed in the genus Harpactes, but morphological difference such as iridescent plumage and bare skin around the eye led to the Javan and Sumatran trogon being placed in a new genus Apalharpactes. The two species were previously considered to only be populations of a single species. Morphological differences were noted, including that the Javan trogan is 30% larger than the Sumatran trogan, a size difference that is larger than that between any other subspecies group in Trogonidae, and that it does not have the chestnut band on the rump of males. This led to the two populations being split into different species. This also supported then desire to consider the Javan Trogon, a vulnerable species, as a separate unit for conservation efforts than Sumatran population, which is not vulnerable.

All current genetic studies agree that Apalharpactes is a distinct lineage of trogons, but there is disagreement about where it should be placed in relation to other taxa. Hosner et al. (2010) placed Apalharpactes as a sister taxa to the African trogons instead of the Asian trogons. However a more recent study in 2019 found most support for the Asian trogons (Apalharpactes and Harpactes) being monophyletic, albeit on rather weak support.

== Habitat and distribution ==
The Sumatran trogon is endemic to the island of Sumatra in Indonesia, where it inhabits the lower montane forests of the lower slopes of the Barisan Mountains that span the western edge of the island. It inhabits the elevations between 750 and 2,200 m (2,460 and 7,220 ft). One expedition to Mount Talakmau notes that its abundance appears to increase with altitude. Trogons in general are known for being sedentary and poor dispersers, and the Sumatran Trogon is no exception.

== Conservation and status ==
The Sumatran trogon is deemed Least Concern for extinction risk by the IUCN. It is, however, an endemic species with a small localised range. There has never been a numerical assessment of the population size, though it is thought to be decreasing.

The choice to split the Sumatran and Javan trogons into respective species appears to have come from an effort to properly assess the vulnerability of the Javan trogon, which is also endemic but with a much smaller and contracting range.

== Behaviour ==
=== Vocalisations ===
The song consists of three whistled notes "wiwi whéeer-lu", the third note dropping off at the end. The call is identical for both the Javan trogon and Sumatran trogon, and is a hoarse "chierr, chierr" or loud "turr" sound. Unlike the Sumatran trogon, the Javan trogon has never been heard making a song, which could be an important point of difference to support the split between the two species, or simply the result of how rare the Javan trogon is.

=== Diet ===
Along with most other Asian trogons, the Sumatran trogon is a still-hunting predator that waits motionless on a branch until prey is spotted, then it attack. Its diet varies and includes insects, fruit, and small vertebrates that will fit within its beak. One was apparently once observed eating a 10 cm (3.9 in) long lizard from the ground. As with other trogons, the leg muscles are so reduced that they cannot walk, or even turn around on a perch without it using its wings. Studies on the specific ecology of different species seems to be lacking.

The Sumatran trogon has been found in mixed-species feeding flocks with other bird species like the Sumatran laughingthrush, the black laughingthrush, the chestnut-capped laughingthrush, and the Sumatran drongo.

=== Reproduction ===
The Sumatran trogon forms monogamous pairs that work together to raise their young. Breeding happens in March. It nests in tree cavities that are either self-excavated or reused from already-made cavities. Clutch sizes range from 2-4 eggs, and chicks are altricial at hatching.
