= Zoo de Cerza =

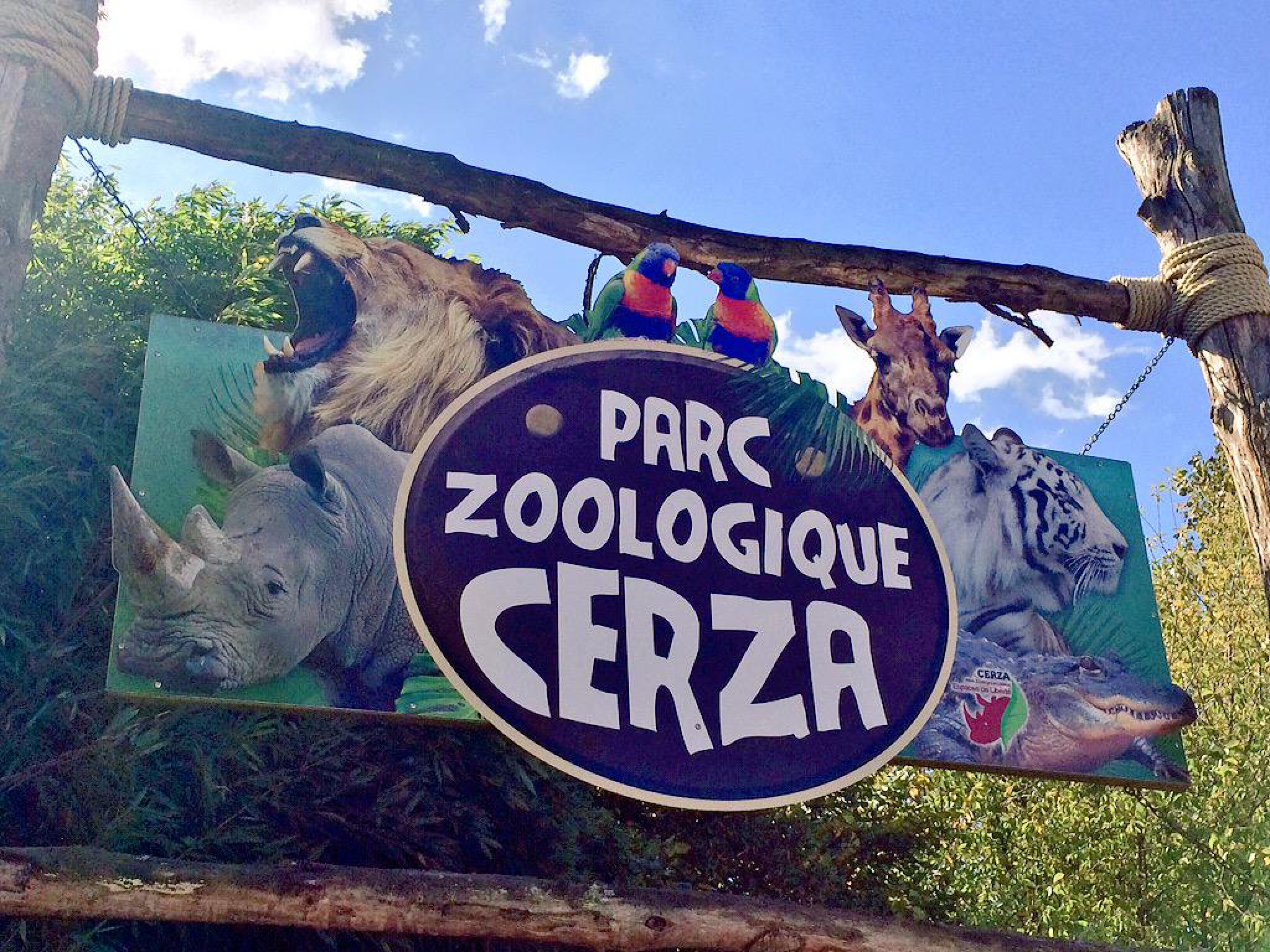
- Interactive map of Zoo de Cerza
- 49°10′55.6″N 0°18′41.79″E
- Date opened: 1986
- Location: Hermival-les-Vaux, Calvados, France
- Land area: 60 Hectare
- No. of animals: 1000
- No. of species: 120
- Annual visitors: 274 000
- Memberships: EAZA
- Website: http://www.cerza.com

The Zoo de Cerza (formally parc zoologique Cerza) is a 60-hectare (150-acre) zoo in Hermival-les-Vaux, Calvados, France.

The zoo is home to some 1000 animals representing about 120 species.

The Park is open from February to November. It receives approximately 300,000 visitors per year.

== History ==
The zoo opened in 1986 by its founders, brothers Thierry & Patrick Jardin. In 2012 Thierry Jardin opened Biotropica, les jardins animaliers.

== Membership ==
The zoo is a member of The French Association of Zoological Parks (AFdPZ), the European Association of Zoos and Aquaria (EAZA) and the World Association of Zoos and Aquariums (WAZA).
