= Sergeant Bill =

Canadian military goat

Bill
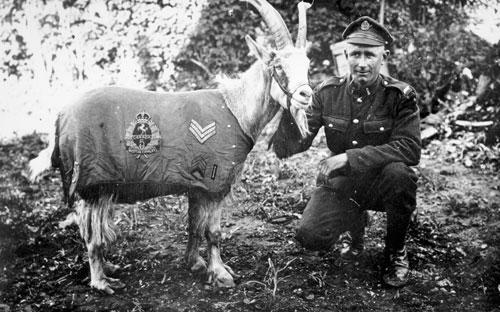
- Died: Winnipeg
- Military career
- Allegiance: Canada
- Rank: Sergeant
- Units: 5th Infantry Battalion, Canadian Expeditionary Force
- Conflicts: World War 1
- Awards: 1914 Star, General Service Medal, Victory Medal

Sergeant Bill was a Canadian goat from Saskatchewan who served as the mascot of the 5th Infantry Battalion of the Canadian Expeditionary Force during the First World War.

Bill was able to hear and warn soldiers of incoming shell explosions, pushing 3 soldiers into a trench within seconds of an incoming shell. In another instance, he cornered 3 enemy guardsmen. He also assisted in guarding prisoners. Bill survived being wounded and gassed on multiple occasions. For his actions, he was awarded the 1914 Star, the General Service Medal, and the Victory Medal.

He faced courts martial on two occasions, once for eating his battalion's personnel roll and the other time for an altercation with another sergeant. He lived the remainder of his life in Winnipeg.

Sgt. Bill can currently be found at Broadview Historical Museum in Saskatchewan.

The children's book "Sergeant Billy - the true story of the goat who went to war" by Mireille Messier (illustrated by Kass Reich) is based on the life of Sergeant Bill.
