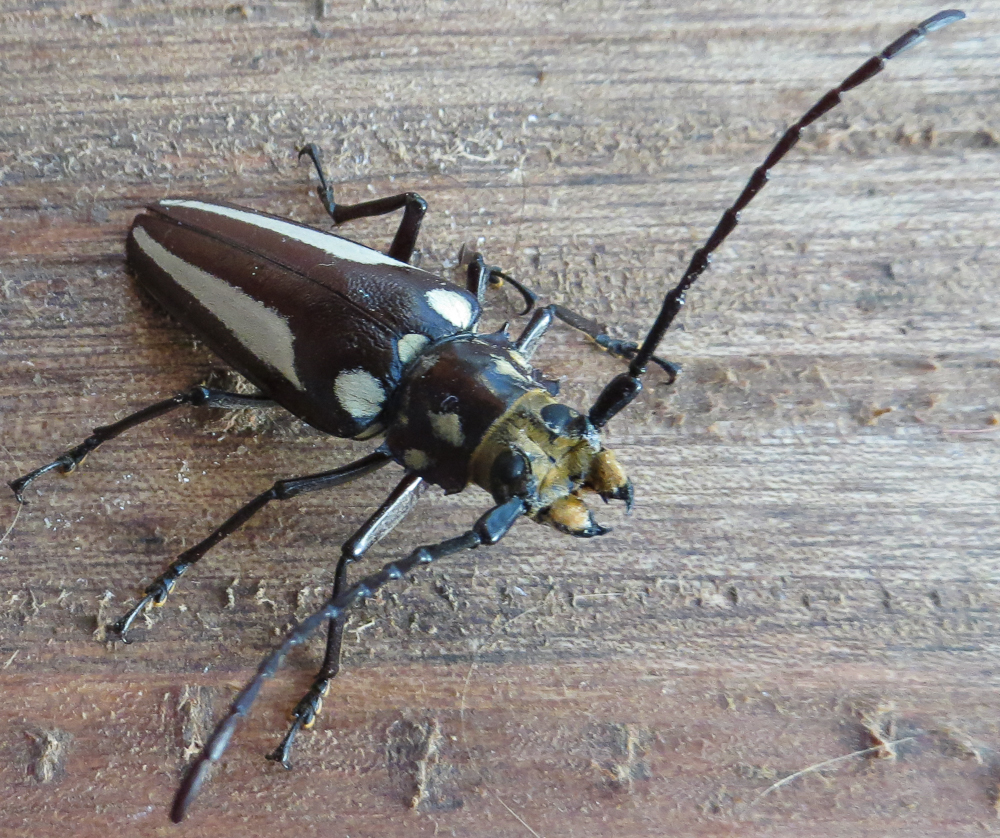
- Callipogon lemoinei

Scientific classification
- Kingdom: Animalia
- Phylum: Arthropoda
- Clade: Pancrustacea
- Class: Insecta
- Order: Coleoptera
- Suborder: Polyphaga
- Infraorder: Cucujiformia
- Family: Cerambycidae
- Subfamily: Prioninae
- Tribe: Callipogonini
- Genus: Callipogon; Audinet-Serville, 1832

= Callipogon =

Genus of beetles

Callipogon is a genus of beetles belonging to the family Cerambycidae. Its closest relatives are the genera Enoplocerus, Ergates and Trichocnemis, with divergence from these lineages estimated to the Cretaceous about 80 million years ago. Most species are found in the Neotropics, with Callipogon relictus being the only palearctic species.

== Species ==
The following species are recognised in the genus Callipogon:

- Callipogon barbatum (Fabricius, 1781)
- Callipogon barbiflavum Chevrolat, 1864
- Callipogon beckeri Lameere, 1904
- Callipogon lemoinei Reiche, 1840
- Callipogon levchenkoi Skrylnik 2020
- Callipogon limonovi Titarenko 2017
- Callipogon proletarium Lameere, 1904
- Callipogon senex Dupont, 1832
- Callipogon sericeum (Olivier, 1795)
- Callipogon relictus Semenov, 1899
