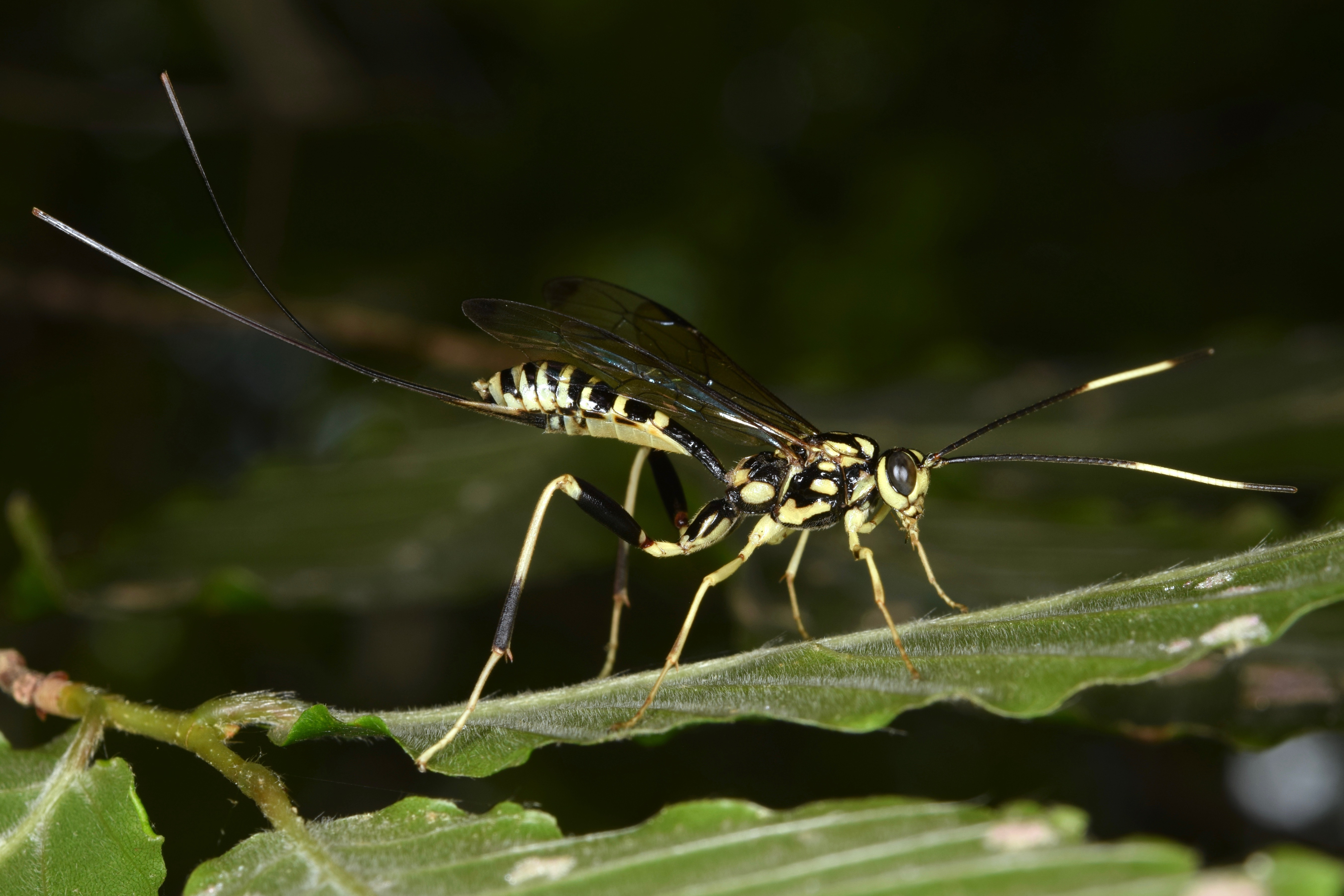
- Arotes amoenus

Scientific classification
- Kingdom: Animalia
- Phylum: Arthropoda
- Class: Insecta
- Order: Hymenoptera
- Family: Ichneumonidae
- Subfamily: Acaenitinae
- Genus: Arotes; Gravenhorst, 1829

= Arotes =

Genus of wasps

Arotes is a genus of parasitoid wasps belonging to the family Ichneumonidae.

The genus was first described by Johann Ludwig Christian Gravenhorst in 1829.

The species of this genus are found in Europe and the Americas.

Species:

- Arotes albicinctus Gravenhorst, 1829
- Arotes amoenus Cresson, 1868
- Arotes decorus (Say, 1835) - parasitoid of Yakuhananomia bidentata
- Arotes ucumari Castillo & Sääksjärvi, 2011
- Arotes ustulatus Kriechbaumer, 1894
