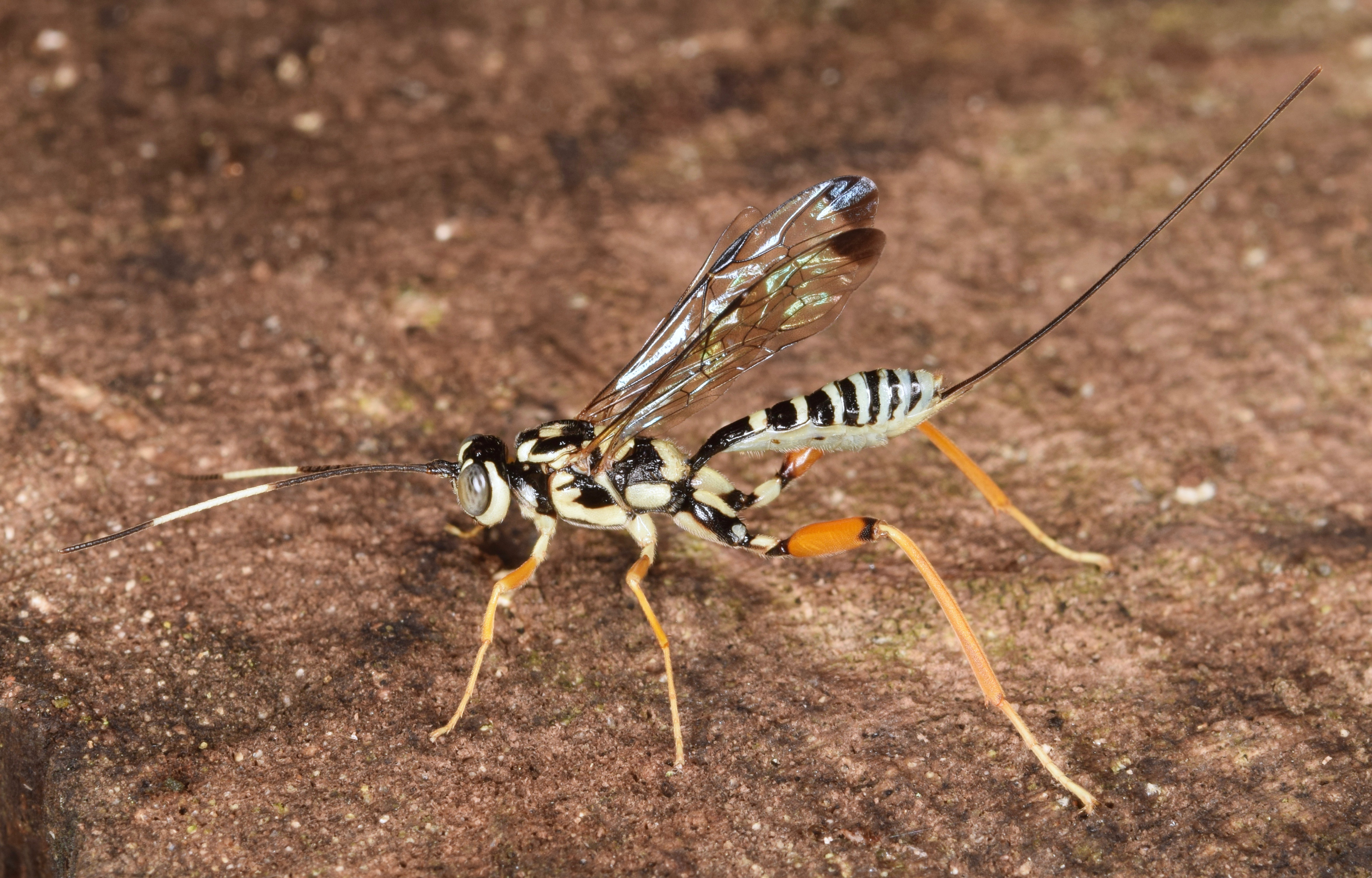

Scientific classification
- Kingdom: Animalia
- Phylum: Arthropoda
- Class: Insecta
- Order: Hymenoptera
- Family: Ichneumonidae
- Genus: Arotes
- Species: A. decorus

Binomial name
- Arotes decorus (Say, 1835)

= Arotes decorus =

Species of wasp

Arotes decorus is a species from the family Ichneumonidae. It is a parasitoid of Xylotrechus colonus and Yakuhananomia bidentata beetles.
