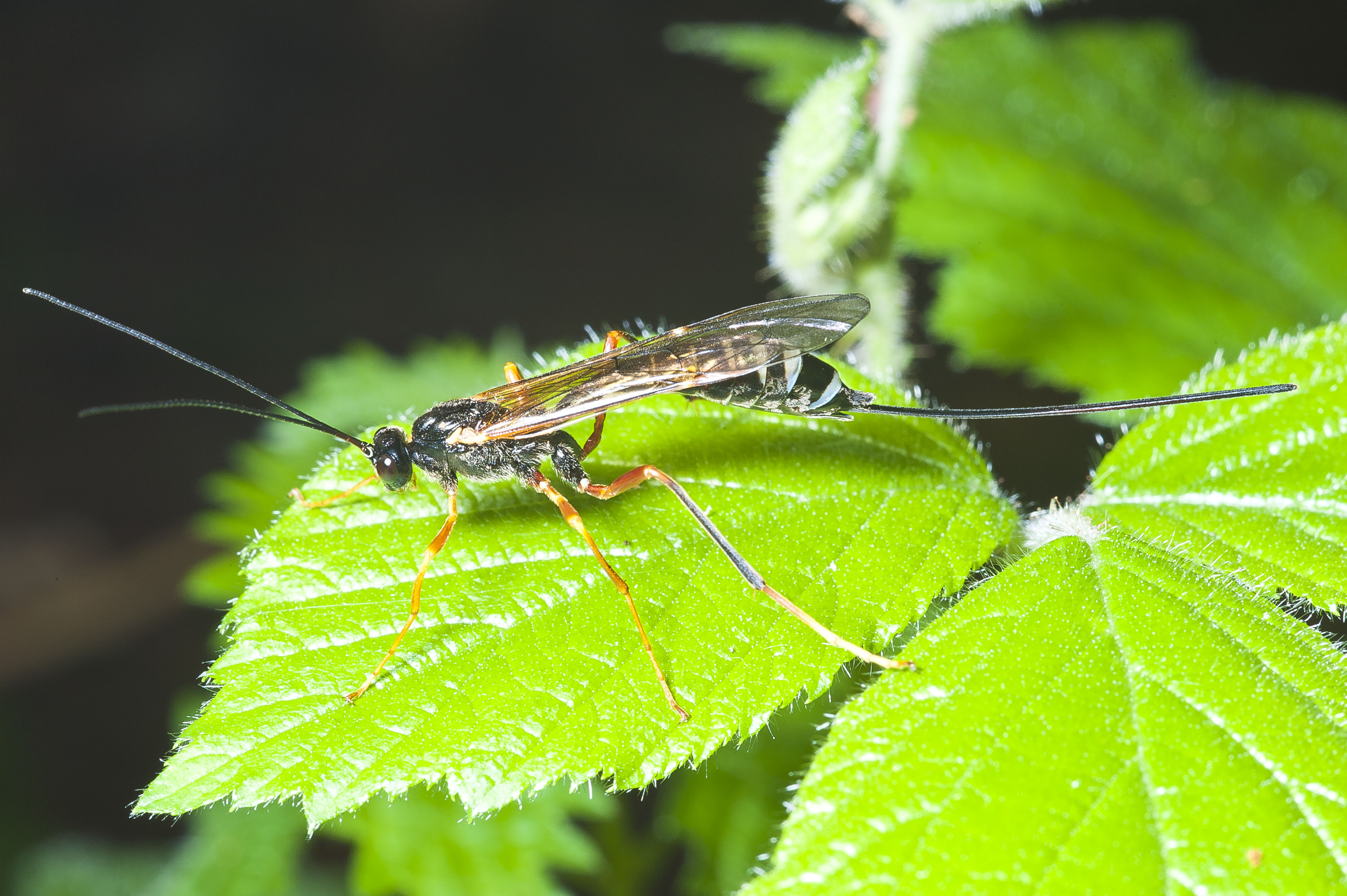

Scientific classification
- Domain: Eukaryota
- Kingdom: Animalia
- Phylum: Arthropoda
- Class: Insecta
- Order: Hymenoptera
- Family: Ichneumonidae
- Genus: Coleocentrus
- Species: C. excitator

Binomial name
- Coleocentrus excitator (Poda, 1761)

= Coleocentrus excitator =

Species of wasp

Coleocentrus excitator is a parasitoid wasp in the family Ichneumonidae that parasitizes the long-horned beetle species Ergates faber.
