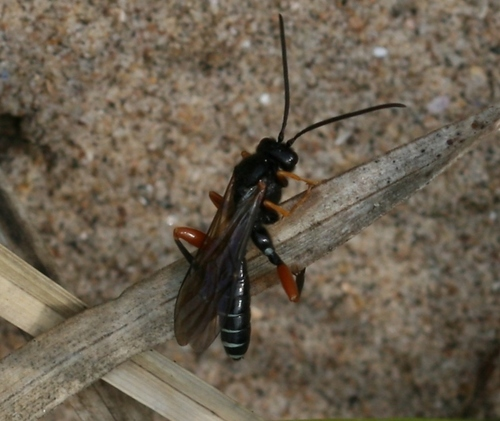

Scientific classification
- Domain: Eukaryota
- Kingdom: Animalia
- Phylum: Arthropoda
- Class: Insecta
- Order: Hymenoptera
- Family: Ichneumonidae
- Genus: Acaenitus
- Species: A. dubitator

Binomial name
- Acaenitus dubitator (Panzer, 1800)

= Acaenitus dubitator =

Species of wasp

Acaenitus dubitator is a species of wasp in the family Ichneumonidae. It is an endoparasitoid of first to third instar Cleonis pigra beetles.
