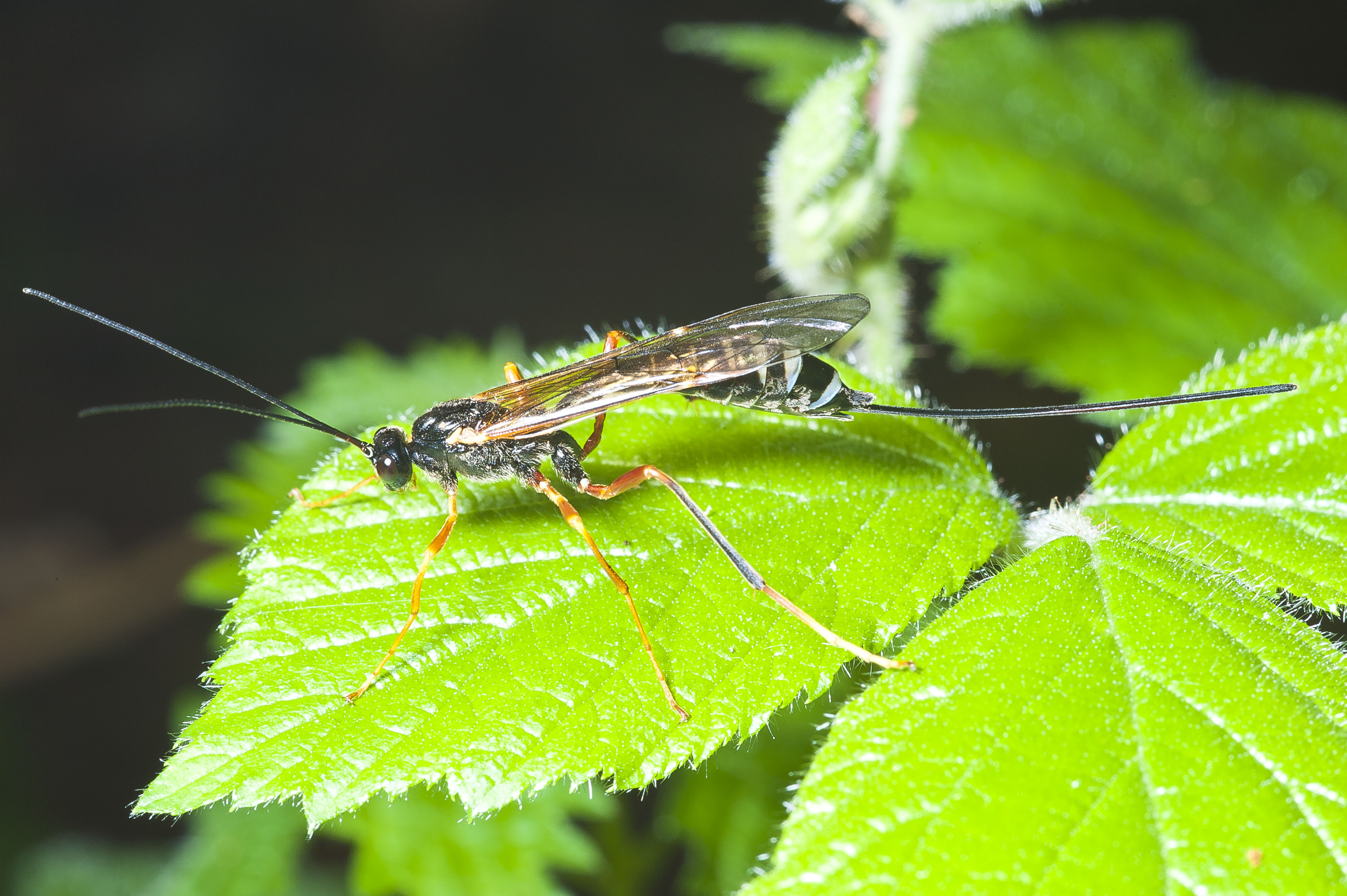
- Coleocentrus excitator

Scientific classification
- Domain: Eukaryota
- Kingdom: Animalia
- Phylum: Arthropoda
- Class: Insecta
- Order: Hymenoptera
- Family: Ichneumonidae
- Subfamily: Acaenitinae
- Genus: Coleocentrus; Gravenhorst, 1829

Species
- See text

= Coleocentrus =

Genus of wasps

Coleocentrus is a genus of parasitoid wasp in the ichneumonid family.

== Species ==
Selected species:

- Coleocentrus alpinus
- Coleocentrus caligatus
- Coleocentrus croceicornis
- Coleocentrus exareolatus
- Coleocentrus excitator
- Coleocentrus flavipes
- Coleocentrus fulvus - found in China
- Coleocentrus heteropus
- Coleocentrus rufus
- Coleocentrus soldanskii
