= Yakuhananomia uenoi =

Scientific classification
- Kingdom: Animalia
- Phylum: Arthropoda
- Class: Insecta
- Order: Coleoptera
- Suborder: Polyphaga
- Infraorder: Cucujiformia
- Family: Mordellidae
- Genus: Yakuhananomia
- Species: Y. uenoi

Binomial name
- Yakuhananomia uenoi Takakuwa, 1995

Species of beetle

Yakuhananomia uenoi is a species of beetle in the family Mordellidae. It was described in 1995. It is endemic to Taiwan.
