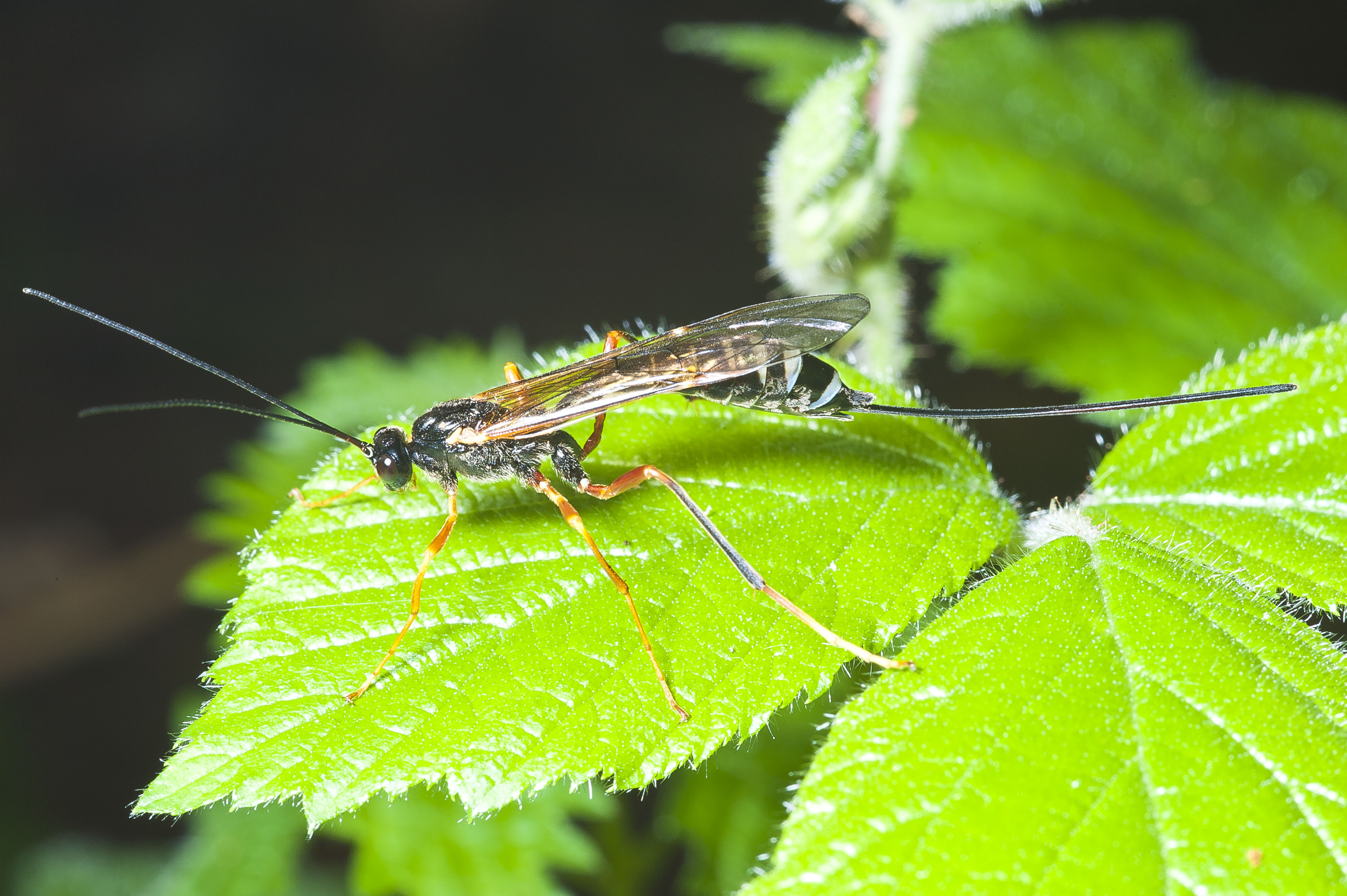
- Coleocentrus excitator

Scientific classification
- Kingdom: Animalia
- Phylum: Arthropoda
- Clade: Pancrustacea
- Class: Insecta
- Order: Hymenoptera
- Family: Ichneumonidae
- Subfamily: Acaenitinae; Förster, 1869

= Acaenitinae =

Subfamily of wasps

Acaenitinae is a subfamily of the parasitoid wasp family Ichneumonidae. Female Acaenitinae have a large triangular projecting genital plate.

== Distribution ==
It is distributed on all continents except Antarctica, although only one specimen (from the genus Arotes) has ever been discovered in South America.

== Taxonomy and phylogeny ==
The subfamily has traditionally been divided into two tribes (Acaenitini and Coleocentrini) and comprises 28 genera. The validity of tribes remains debated. Wahl and Gauld considered Coleocentrini paraphyletic and favored abandoning a tribal arrangement in 1998. In contrast, Klopfstein et al. and Bennett et al. found Acaenitini to be monophyletic in 2019. However, they also found that Coleocentrus, the type genus of Coleocentrini, was not recovered as sister to Acaenitini.

== Genera ==
=== Acaenitini Förster, 1869 ===
- Acaenitus Latreille, 1809
- Arotes Gravenhorst, 1829
- Asperpunctatus Wang, 1989
- Boloderma Morley, 1913
- Dentifemura Sheng and Sun, 2010
- Dimorphonyx Seyrig, 1932
- Hieroceryx Tosquinet, 1896
- Ishigakia Uchida, 1928
- Jezarotes Uchida, 1928
- Metachorischizus Uchida, 1928
- Notaulites Seyrig, 1932
- Paracollyria Cameron, 1906
- Phaenolobus Förster, 1869
- Phalgea Cameron, 1905
- Phorotrophus Saussure, 1892
- Prosacron Townes, 1971
- Siphimedia Cameron, 1902
- Spilopteron Townes, 1965
- Yamatarotes Uchida, 1929
- Yezoceryx Uchida, 1928

=== Coleocentrini Clément, 1938 ===
- Coleocentrus Gravenhorst, 1829
- Cumatocinetus Sheng 2002,
- Eremocinetus Viktorov, 1964
- Hallocinetus Viktorov, 1962
- Leptacoenites Strobl, 1902
- Mesoclistus Förster, 1869
- Procinetus Förster, 1869

=== Incertae sedis ===
- Combivena Sheng & Sun, 2014
