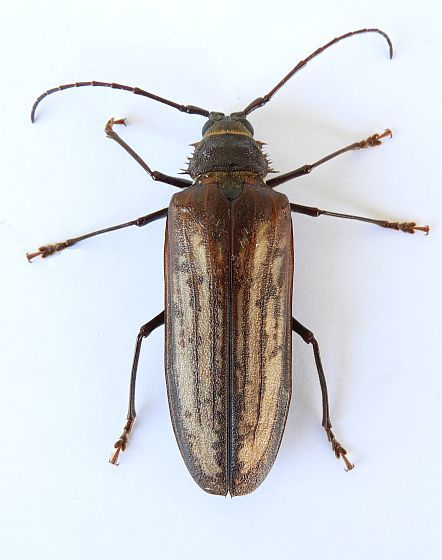

Scientific classification
- Kingdom: Animalia
- Phylum: Arthropoda
- Class: Insecta
- Order: Coleoptera
- Suborder: Polyphaga
- Infraorder: Cucujiformia
- Family: Cerambycidae
- Genus: Trichocnemis
- Species: T. spiculatus

Binomial name
- Trichocnemis spiculatus LeConte, 1851

= Trichocnemis spiculatus =

Species of beetle

Trichocnemis spiculatus is a species of wood boring beetle.

== Description ==
Common names include pine sawyer, western pine sawyer, spined woodborer, and ponderosa pine borer. A taxonomic synonym is Ergates spiculatus. This beetle species develops on fallen ponderosa pines and Douglas firs. T. spiculatus is the largest species of wood boring beetle in Colorado.

== Range ==
The range is within Western North America.

== Ecology ==
As larvae they eat wood of dead and dying pines,their host plants are mainly ponderosa pine and Douglas fir. They lay eggs in bark crevices of these trees. The larvae bore tunnels through the sapwood and heartwood. They have a life cycle of several years long.

== Taxonomy ==
Trichocnemis spiculatus contains the following subspecies:

- Trichocnemis spiculatus spiculatus
- Trichocnemis spiculatus neomexicanus
