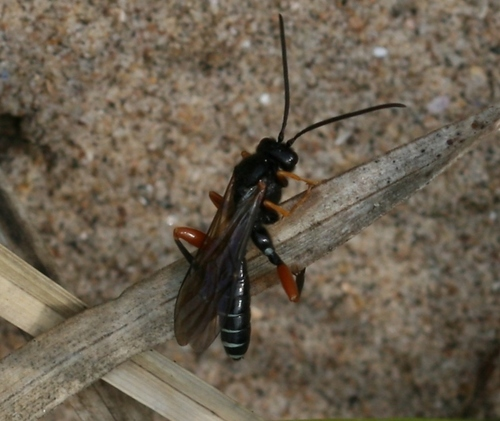
- Acaenitus dubitator

Scientific classification
- Kingdom: Animalia
- Phylum: Arthropoda
- Clade: Pancrustacea
- Class: Insecta
- Order: Hymenoptera
- Family: Ichneumonidae
- Subfamily: Acaenitinae
- Genus: Acaenitus; Latreille, 1809

Synonyms
- Acoenites Latreille, 1810; Acoenitus Griffith, 1832

= Acaenitus =

Genus of wasps

Acaenitus is a genus of Ichneumonid wasp.

== Taxonomy ==
Acaenitus contains the following species:

- Acaenitus defunctus (Brues, 1906)†
- Acaenitus dubitator (Panzer, 1800)
- Acaenitus lividus (Heer, 1850)†
