= Yakuhananomia yakui =

Scientific classification
- Domain: Eukaryota
- Kingdom: Animalia
- Phylum: Arthropoda
- Class: Insecta
- Order: Coleoptera
- Suborder: Polyphaga
- Infraorder: Cucujiformia
- Family: Mordellidae
- Genus: Yakuhananomia
- Species: Y. yakui

Binomial name
- Yakuhananomia yakui Kônô, 1930

Synonyms
- Tomoxia yakui Kônô, 1930

Species of beetle

Yakuhananomia yakui is a species of beetle in the family Mordellidae. It was described in 1930. It is found in Japan.
