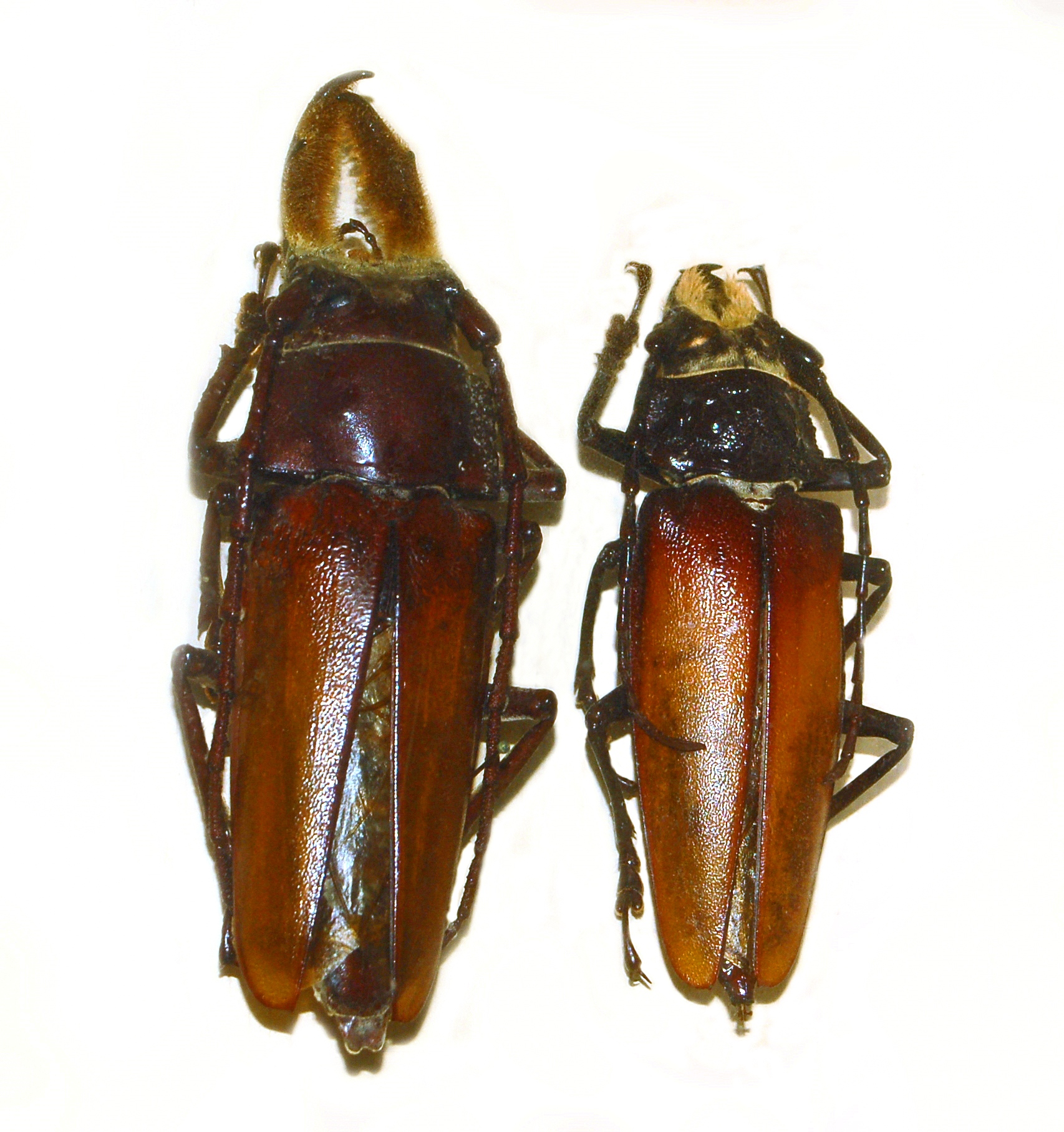
- Male and female from Guatemala

Scientific classification
- Kingdom: Animalia
- Phylum: Arthropoda
- Clade: Pancrustacea
- Class: Insecta
- Order: Coleoptera
- Suborder: Polyphaga
- Infraorder: Cucujiformia
- Family: Cerambycidae
- Genus: Callipogon
- Species: C. barbatus

Binomial name
- Callipogon barbatus (Fabricius, 1775)

Synonyms
- List: Callipogon friedlaenderi Nonfried, 1892; Callipogon hauseri Nonfried, 1892; Cerambyx barbatus Gmelin, 1790; Prionus barbatus Fabricius, 1781

= Callipogon barbatum =

Callipogon barbatus

Species of beetle

Callipogon barbatum is a species of flat-faced longhorn beetle in the subfamily Prioninae of the family Cerambycidae.

== Description ==
Callipogon barbatum reaches a length of about 50–60 millimetres (2.0–2.4 in) in females, about 100 millimetres (3.9 in) in males. Head and pronotum are black, covered with white-yellowish hairs. Elytra are reddish-brown or light brown with a reddish tinge. The males have well-developed mandibles, with long light brown and red hairs. The mandibles of females are much shorter than the in males. Antennae are dark brown, up to 80 millimetres (3.1 in) long.

== Distribution ==
This species occurs from Mexico through Central America to Panama.
