= Yakuhananomia fulviceps =

Scientific classification
- Domain: Eukaryota
- Kingdom: Animalia
- Phylum: Arthropoda
- Class: Insecta
- Order: Coleoptera
- Suborder: Polyphaga
- Infraorder: Cucujiformia
- Family: Mordellidae
- Genus: Yakuhananomia
- Species: Y. fulviceps

Binomial name
- Yakuhananomia fulviceps Champion, 1891

Synonyms
- Tomoxia fulviceps Champion, 1891

Species of beetle

Yakuhananomia fulviceps is a species of beetle in the genus Yakuhananomia of the family Mordellidae. It was described in 1891.
