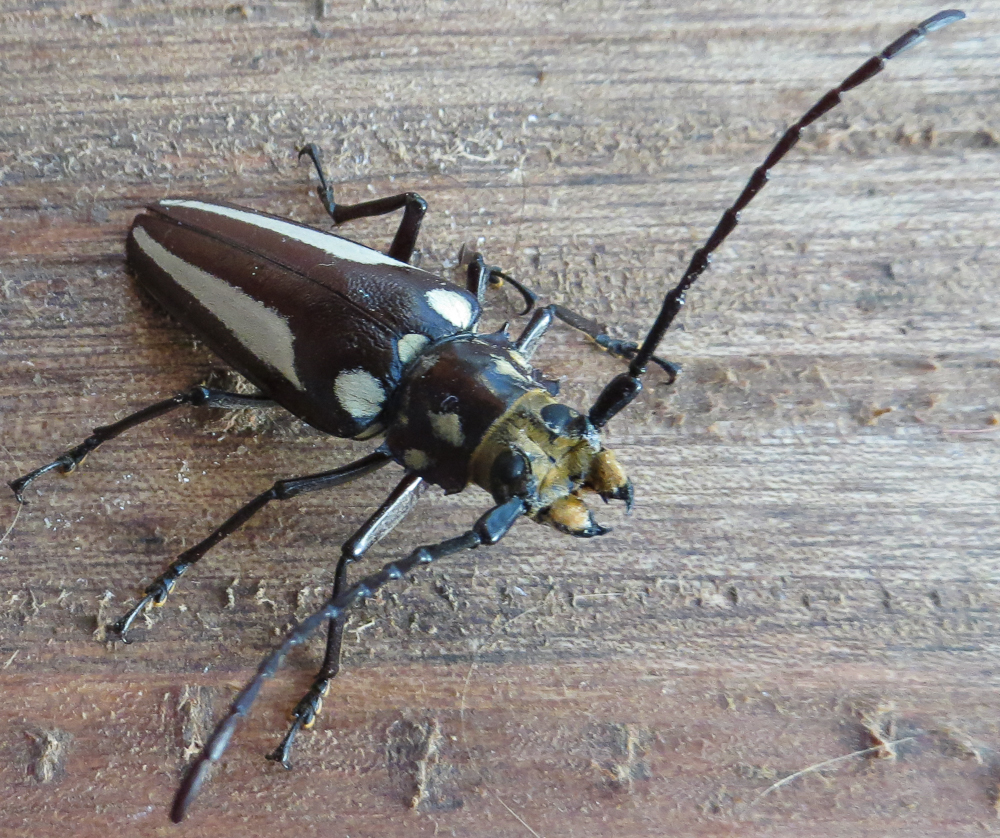
- Callipogon lemoinei in Panama

Scientific classification
- Kingdom: Animalia
- Phylum: Arthropoda
- Class: Insecta
- Order: Coleoptera
- Suborder: Polyphaga
- Infraorder: Cucujiformia
- Family: Cerambycidae
- Genus: Callipogon
- Species: C. lemoinei

Binomial name
- Callipogon lemoinei Reiche, 1840

= Callipogon lemoinei =

Species of beetle

Callipogon lemoinei is a species of relatively large longhorn beetle of the genus Callipogon, native to Central America and Colombia. The species was originally described by Louis Jérôme Reiche in 1840.
