= Coleocentrus caligatus =

Scientific classification
- Domain: Eukaryota
- Kingdom: Animalia
- Phylum: Arthropoda
- Class: Insecta
- Order: Hymenoptera
- Family: Ichneumonidae
- Genus: Coleocentrus
- Species: C. caligatus

Binomial name
- Coleocentrus caligatus (Gravenhorst, 1829)

Species of wasp

Coleocentrus caligatus is a parasitoid wasp from ichneumonid family that parasitizes long-horned beetle of Tetropium castaneum.
