= Yakuhananomia ermischi =

Scientific classification
- Domain: Eukaryota
- Kingdom: Animalia
- Phylum: Arthropoda
- Class: Insecta
- Order: Coleoptera
- Suborder: Polyphaga
- Infraorder: Cucujiformia
- Family: Mordellidae
- Genus: Yakuhananomia
- Species: Y. ermischi

Binomial name
- Yakuhananomia ermischi Franciscolo, 1952

Species of beetle

Yakuhananomia ermischi is a species of beetle in the genus Yakuhananomia of the family Mordellidae. It was described in 1952.
