= Yakuhananomia luteoguttata =

Scientific classification
- Kingdom: Animalia
- Phylum: Arthropoda
- Class: Insecta
- Order: Coleoptera
- Suborder: Polyphaga
- Infraorder: Cucujiformia
- Family: Mordellidae
- Subfamily: Mordellinae
- Tribe: Mordellini
- Genus: Yakuhananomia
- Species: Y. luteoguttata

Binomial name
- Yakuhananomia luteoguttata (Blanchard, 1843)

Synonyms
- Mordella luteoguttata Blanchard, 1843

Species of beetles

Yakuhananomia luteoguttata is a species of tumbling flower beetle in the family Mordellidae, found in South America.
