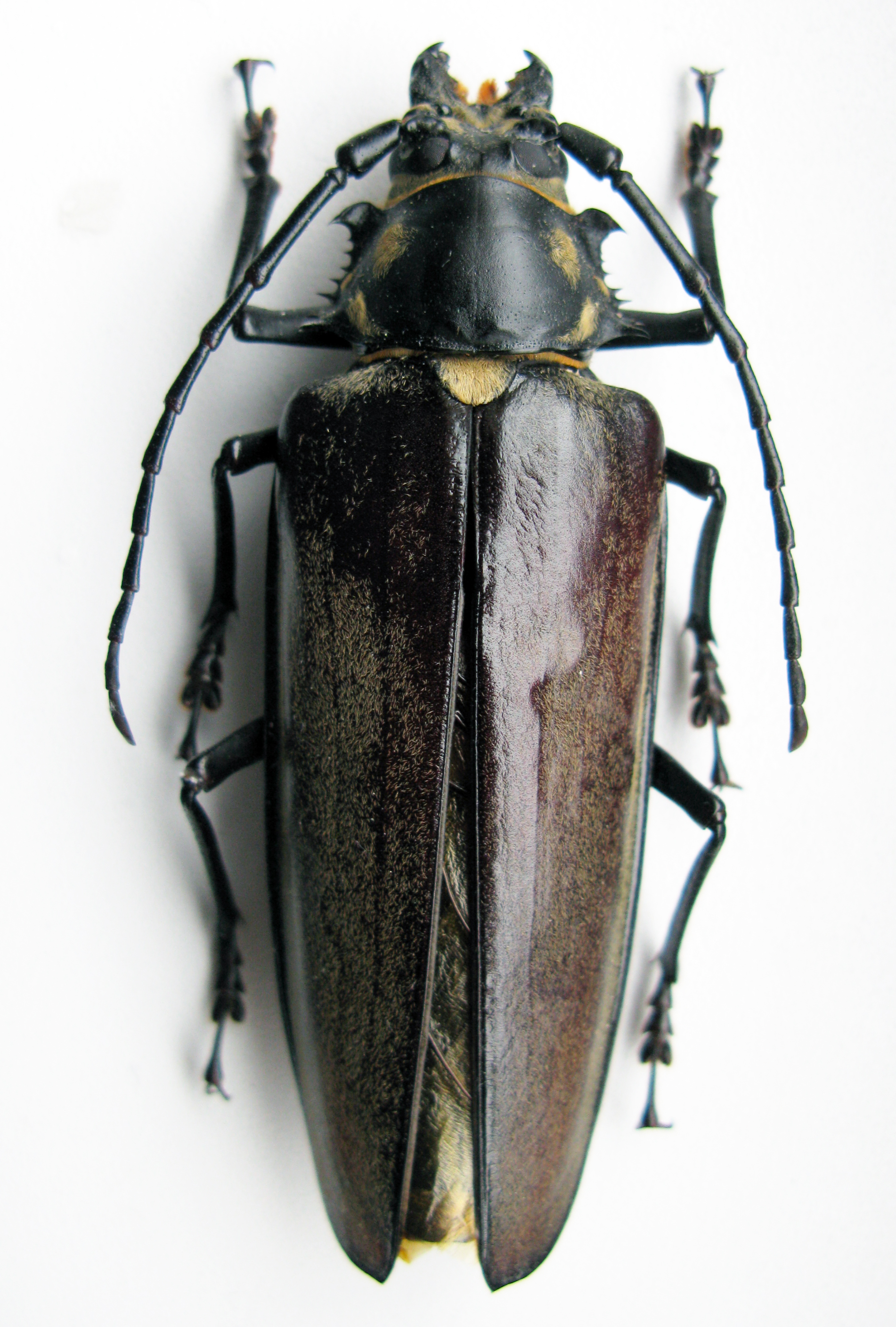

Scientific classification
- Kingdom: Animalia
- Phylum: Arthropoda
- Clade: Pancrustacea
- Class: Insecta
- Order: Coleoptera
- Suborder: Polyphaga
- Infraorder: Cucujiformia
- Family: Cerambycidae
- Genus: Callipogon
- Species: C. relictus

Binomial name
- Callipogon relictus Semenov 1899
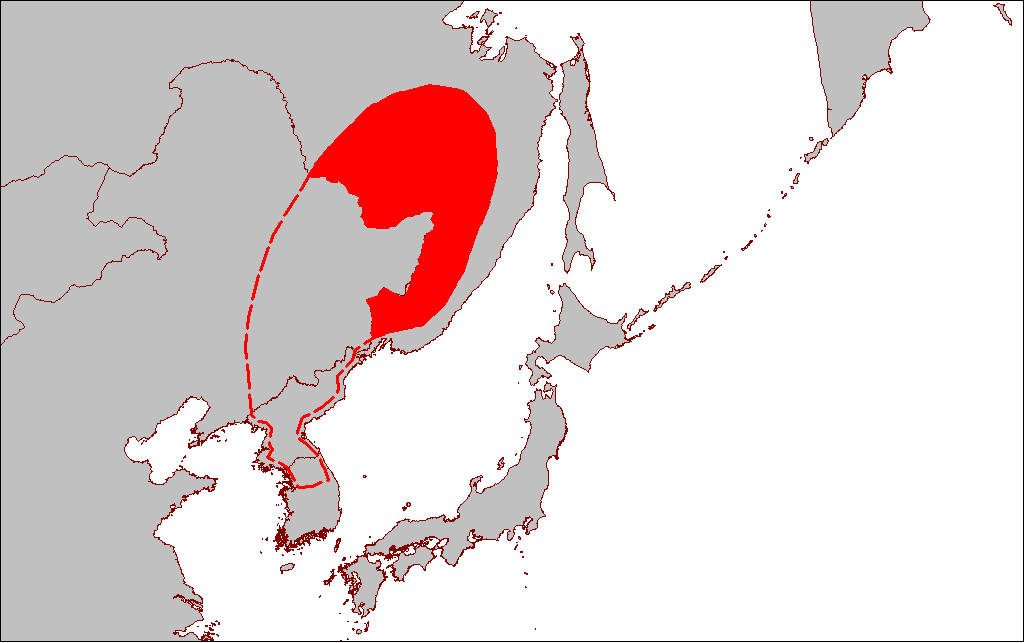

= Callipogon relictus =

Species of beetle

Callipogon relictus is a species of longhorn beetle which inhabits mixed and deciduous forests and is mostly found in Korea, but also in China and the southern part of Russian Far East. With the length reaching up to 110 mm (4.3 in), Callipogon relictus is the largest beetle of Russia. Its population is decreasing due to deforestation and uncontrolled collection, and therefore the species is listed in the Russian Red Book (category II).

Larvae of Callipogon relictus develop in drying deciduous trees over a period of 4 to 6 years. The same tree can be populated by larvae several times a year. The larvae spread spores of the fungus Pleurotus citrinopileatus, which contribute to degradation of the tree.

Larvae of different longhorn beetles, such as Callipogon relictus, Rosalia coelestis, Leptura thoracica, Rhabdoclytus acutivittis, Anoplodera cyanea and several other species, can coexist in the same tree.

== Systematics ==
The beetle is a relict and the sole representative of the tropical genus Callipogon in the fauna of the Old World – other species of this genus inhabit Central and South America. The divergence between Callipogon relictus and other species in the genus is estimated to have occurred around 34 million years ago, around the Eocene/Oligocene boundary, during the Early Eocene Climatic Optimum. Callipogon relictus was described in 1898 by the Russian entomologist Andrey Semyonov-Tyan-Shansky (who wrote his last name as Semyonov until 1906). He distinguished the new species from the other species of the genus by the following features:

- Extended rear part, that makes antennae shorter relative to the body size,
- Shorter and almost hairless upper jaws
- Edges of the prothorax are not jagged but bear spines,
- Eyes are closer together.

These features were later interpreted as a sign of higher evolutionary development of Callipogon relictus compared to other species of its genus, but a more recent phylogenetic study found that the species is nested within the phylogeny of the genus, being closely related to species found from Colombia to Mexico.

== Distribution ==
In Russia Callipogon relictus inhabits Amur Oblast, to the south and south-east of the town Raychikhinsk. It is also common in the Khingan and Norsk reserves, in the south of Khabarovsk Krai (south from Khabarovsk city), Jewish Autonomous Oblast and Primorsky Krai. The northernmost observation was reported near the village of Ekimchan in Amur Oblast. Outside Russia the beetle occurs in north-eastern China, North Korea and South Korea. It is expected that its distribution will increase to the north with climate change.

== Description ==
=== Adults ===
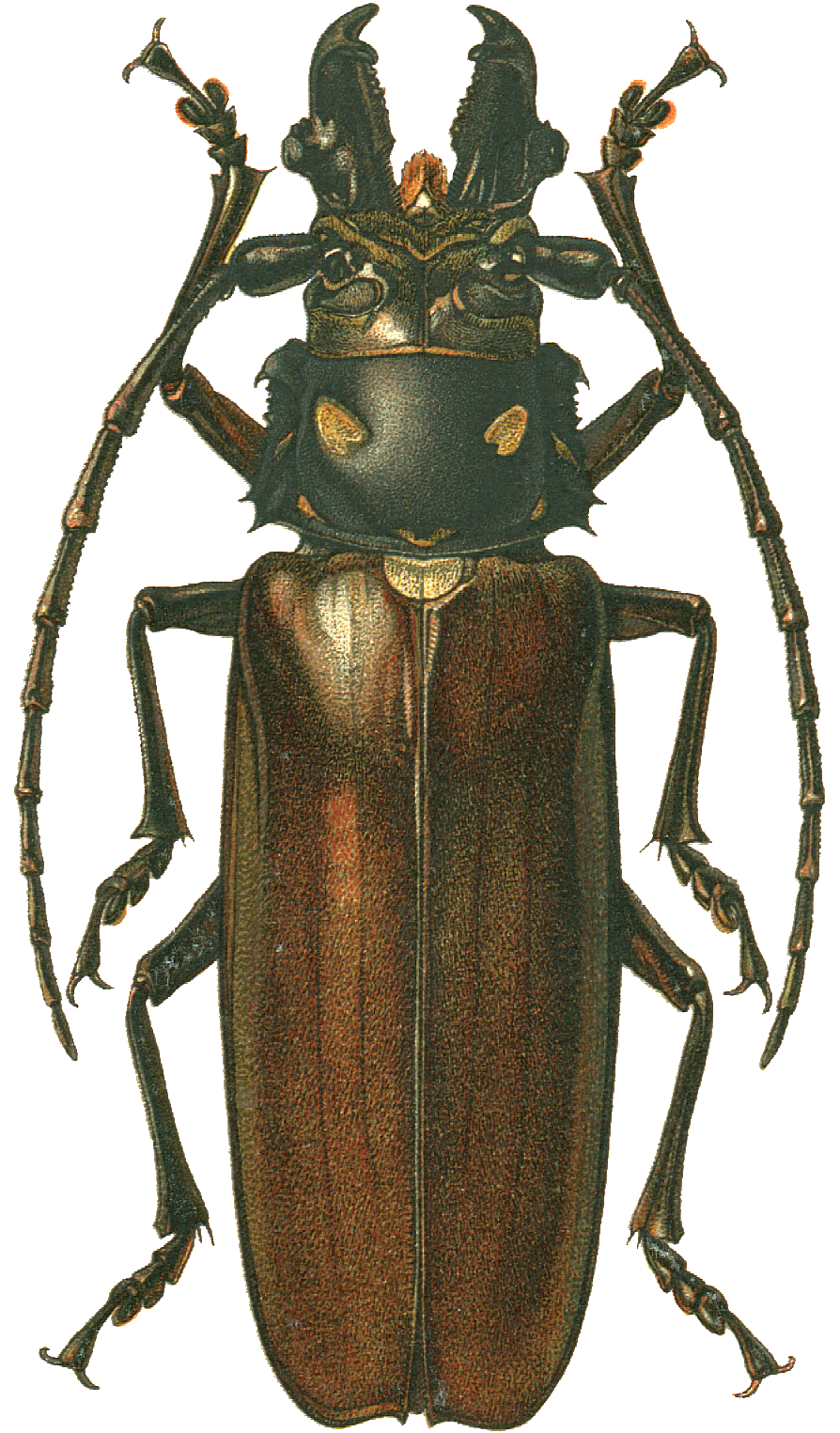
Male Callipogon relictus . Illustration from the book by Jacobson "Beetles of Russia, Western Europe and adjacent countries", 1905–1916.

Developed body (imago) is black, with brown elytra and brown-black feet; there are two pairs of bright spots of hair on pronotum. The size and shape of jaws and antennae varies among individuals. Antennae are dotted and rather long. Their first segment is short and thickened. The third segment is extended and is longer than the fourth and fifth segments combined. The fourth segment is equal or slightly longer than the fifth, and the 11th segment is longer than the first. The lower parts of third to tenth segments have spines.

Mandibles are two-toothed and are very large in males, longer than the head; they are much shorter in females. The upper side of the jaw is covered with coarse, wrinkled punctation, and the lower jaw and lower lip have thick shaggy orange felt. Pronotum is convex, with narrow spines on its sides; the spines are longer in females than males. Scutellum is densely covered with yellowish hairs. Elytra are very long, spotted and rounded at their top; they are more shiny in males than in females.

=== Larva, egg and pupa ===
Larvae are white, with black mandibles; the front half of pronotum has a transverse red stripe, which can have four narrow grooves. Larval body is massive, yellowish-white and covered with sparse, fine yellowish hairs. The head is strongly retracted into prothorax, epistoma is well delimited. Frontal sutures are distinct, longitudinal edges are sharply defined. Hypostome consists of two longitudinal sclerites, which are moved apart by the protruding regularly plate. Clypeus is small, transverse, whitish. Pronotum covers much of the head. The shield of pronotum is smooth at its front, and its back is densely covered with wrinkles. Thoracic legs are short, with long claws, covered with thick bristles.

The egg has an oval shape and is 6–7 mm (0.24–0.28 in) long. It is pink in the early stage, then darkens and turns black. The chorion of the egg has deep, thick, slightly faceted cells. The gaps between the cells are smaller than the cells themselves.

The pupa has a sturdy body, with antennae pressed to the sides. A narrow longitudinal groove runs in the middle of pronotum, and the abdomen is broad, strongly narrowed to the top, with protruding abdominal tergites which are covered in short thick spines.

== Lifestyle ==
Callipogon relictus inhabits mixed and deciduous forests. It is unknown whether it inhabits temperate coniferous forests, but the beetles were sometimes found in coniferous plantations. Larva feeds on rotten wood, and the adults drink juice, which protrudes from the trunks of linden, elm and other trees. In captivity, one female could drink up to 0.5 millilitres (0.018 imp fl oz; 0.017 US fl oz) of sugar syrup at once. Adults are active during the day; in the night they fly to the light sources. During the day, females fly more than males and therefore are encountered more frequently.

Larvae develop in such trees as Japanese elm, Manchurian Ash, Tilia amurensis and Populus maximowiczii; they rarely occupy Mongolian oak, sawtooth oak, Siberian elm, Japanese elm, Betula costata, Carpinus laxiflora and Manchurian maple.

Entomopathogenic fungi such as Metarhizium anisopliae (Clavicipitaceae family) are deadly for a variety of insects, including the adult Callipogon relictus.

== Reproduction ==
Females reach a length of 58–85 mm (2.3–3.3 in), and the males are 60–110 mm (2.4–4.3 in) long. Females emit a special secretion to attract a partner. Mating occurs on the tree which serves as a feeding ground for larvae, below the place where the female will lay eggs; copulation lasts up to an hour. After mating the male does not leave female. Instead, he places front legs on the elytra of the female and they together climb the tree up to where the female will lay eggs. Eggs are laid individually or in groups on the bark of trees with a trunk diameter of 30–100 cm (12–39 in). Over a lifetime (adult beetles live up to a month), a female can produce up to 28 eggs. After the female has laid eggs, the couple crawls down tree and dies on the ground.

Newborn larvae dig under the bark making corridors up to 40 cm (16 in) long and 2 cm (0.79 in) wide. They then delve into wood to a depth of 5 to 30 cm (2.0 to 11.8 in) creating a network of tunnels there. A single tree may be re-populated several times and therefore usually contains larvae of different ages; only completely dried-out trees are suitable for larva development. If a dry tree branch breaks from the tree with the larvae inside, the larvae stay inside the branch, but produce smaller adults than usual. Larvae live through 4–6 winters. After the last overwintering, they make large cradles (100–150 mm, 4–6 in) oriented perpendicular to the trunk, separated from the tree surface by about 2 cm (0.79 in). Then the larva turns in the cradle with its head toward the trunk surface and pupates. Pupation occurs in June–July during 20–35 days and the pupa grows up to 70–110 cm (28–43 in) long. Females exit cradles a few days before males.
