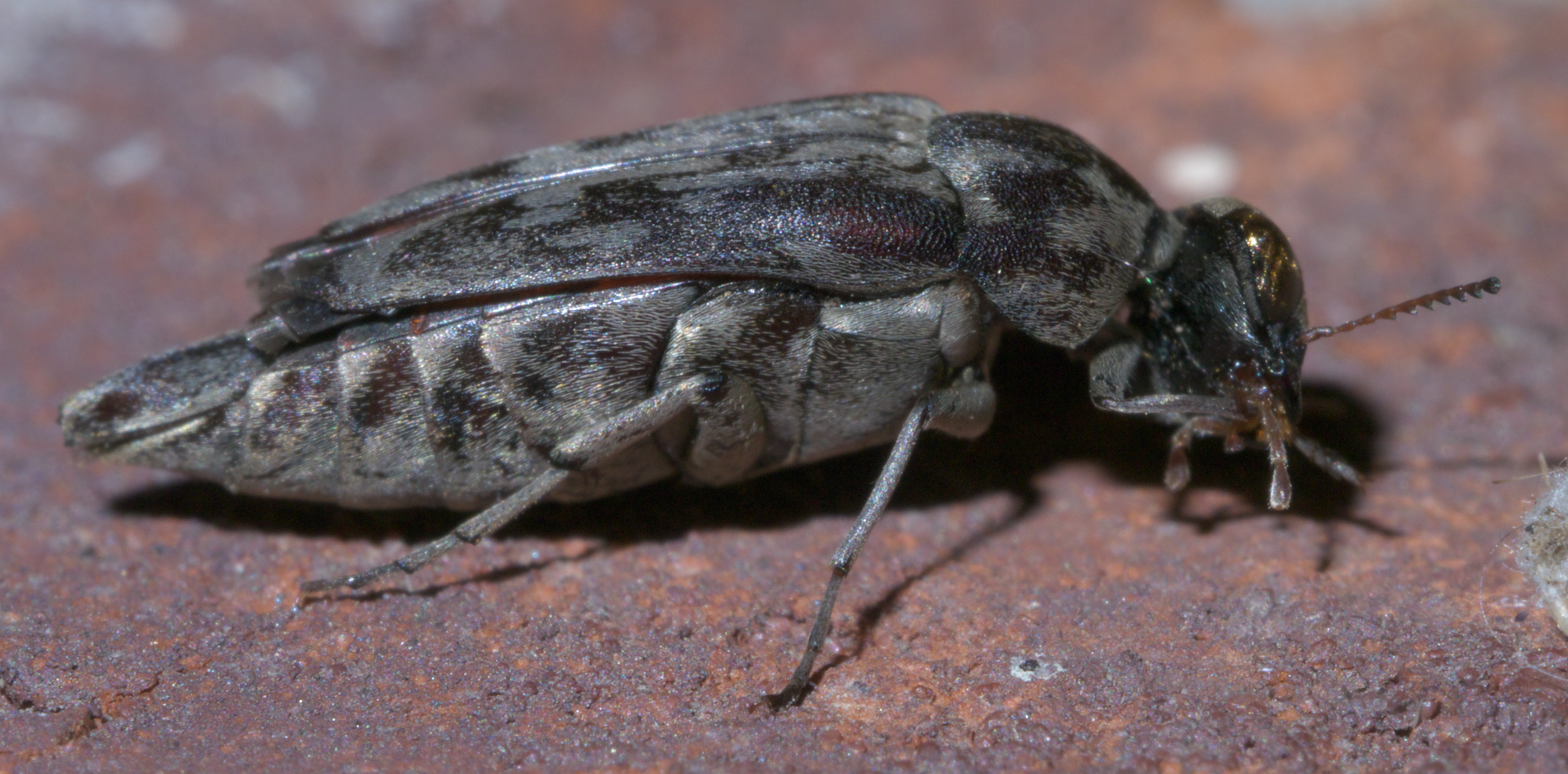
- Yakuhananomia bidentata

Scientific classification
- Domain: Eukaryota
- Kingdom: Animalia
- Phylum: Arthropoda
- Class: Insecta
- Order: Coleoptera
- Suborder: Polyphaga
- Infraorder: Cucujiformia
- Family: Mordellidae
- Subfamily: Mordellinae
- Tribe: Mordellini
- Genus: Yakuhananomia; Kôno, 1935

Synonyms
- Yukahananomia

= Yakuhananomia =

Genus of beetles

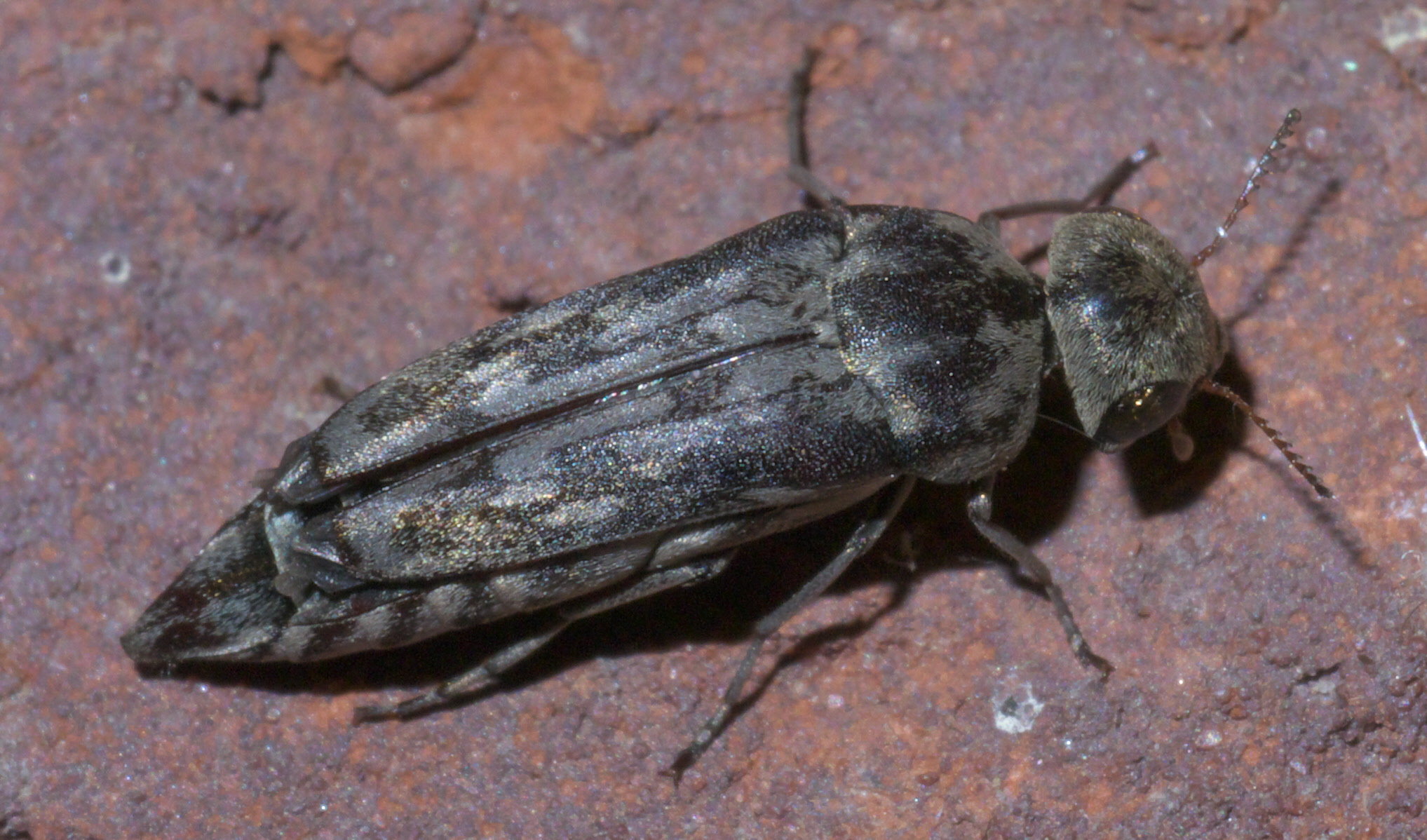
Yakuhananomia bidentata

Yakuhananomia is a genus of tumbling flower beetles in the family Mordellidae. There are at least seven described species in Yakuhananomia.

== Species ==
These species belong to the genus Yakuhananomia:

- Yakuhananomia bidentata (Say, 1824) (North America)
- Yakuhananomia ermischi Franciscolo, 1952 (São Tomé and Príncipe)
- Yakuhananomia fulviceps (Champion, 1891) (Mexico and Central America)
- Yakuhananomia interrupta (Champion, 1891)
- Yakuhananomia luteoguttata (Blanchard, 1843)
- Yakuhananomia uenoi Takakuwa, 1995 (Taiwan and east Asia)
- Yakuhananomia yakui (Kono 1930) (Japan and east Asia)
