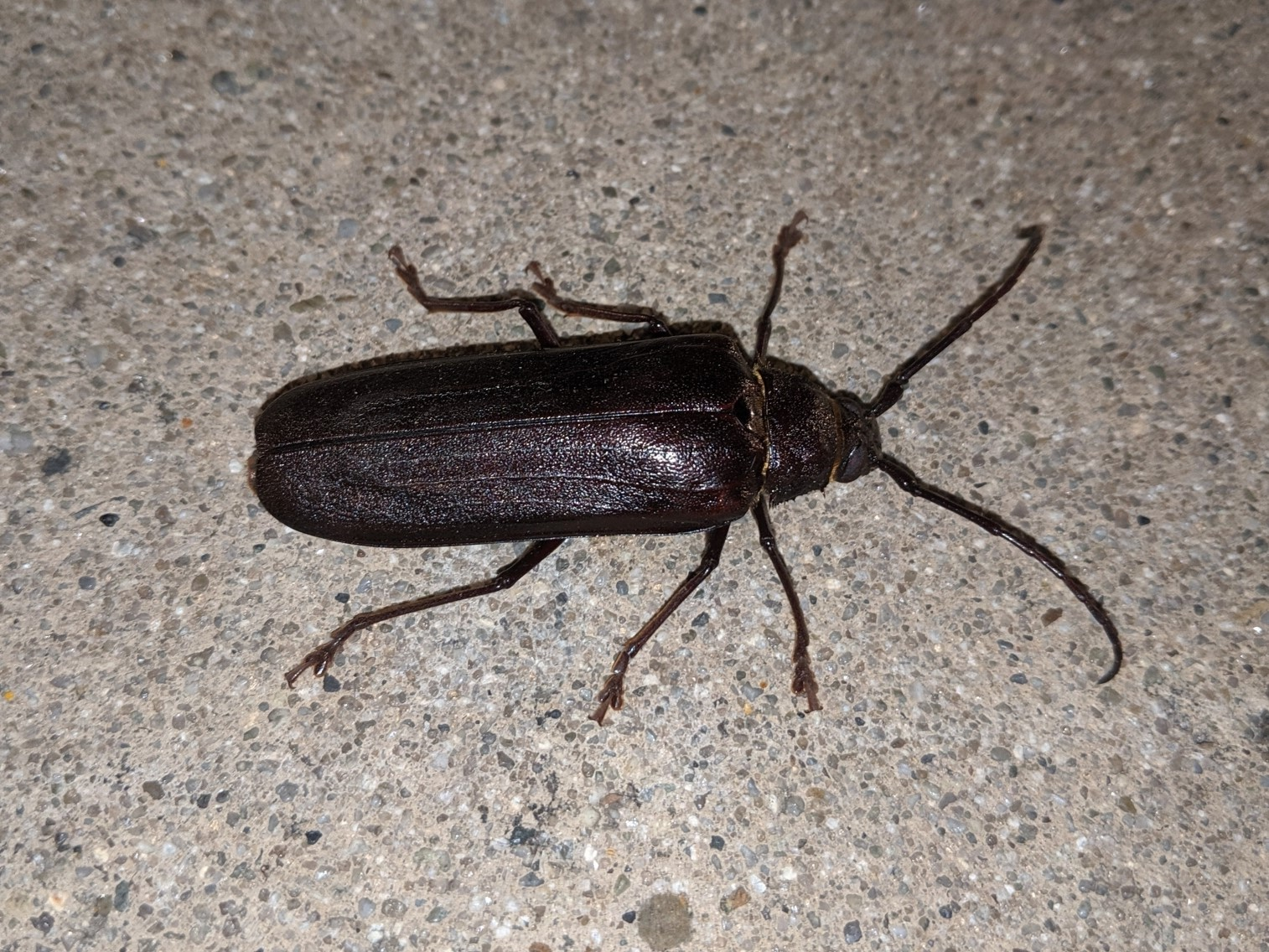
- Trichocnemis spiculatus

Scientific classification
- Kingdom: Animalia
- Phylum: Arthropoda
- Class: Insecta
- Order: Coleoptera
- Suborder: Polyphaga
- Infraorder: Cucujiformia
- Family: Cerambycidae
- Subfamily: Prioninae
- Tribe: Callipogonini
- Genus: Trichocnemis; LeConte, 1851

Species
- 2

= Trichocnemis =

Genus of beetles

Trichocnemis is a genus of beetles in the longhorn beetle family, Cerambycidae. Its species have often been treated as members of genus Ergates. Authors who separate the two genera differentiate Trichocnemis by a proportionally smaller head, the shape of the mandibles, the length of the antennae, and various other details in the morphology of the body and legs.

Beetles in genus Trichocnemis have large, elongated bodies in shades of brown, usually with lighter elytra. They have small heads with big eyes and relatively short antennae. The mandibles are less than half the length of the head and curve inward.

Trichocnemis species are distributed in western North America from Southwestern Canada to Baja California.

There are two species:

- Trichocnemis pauper
- Trichocnemis spiculatus – ponderosus borer
  - T. spiculatus neomexicanus
  - T. spiculatus spiculatus
