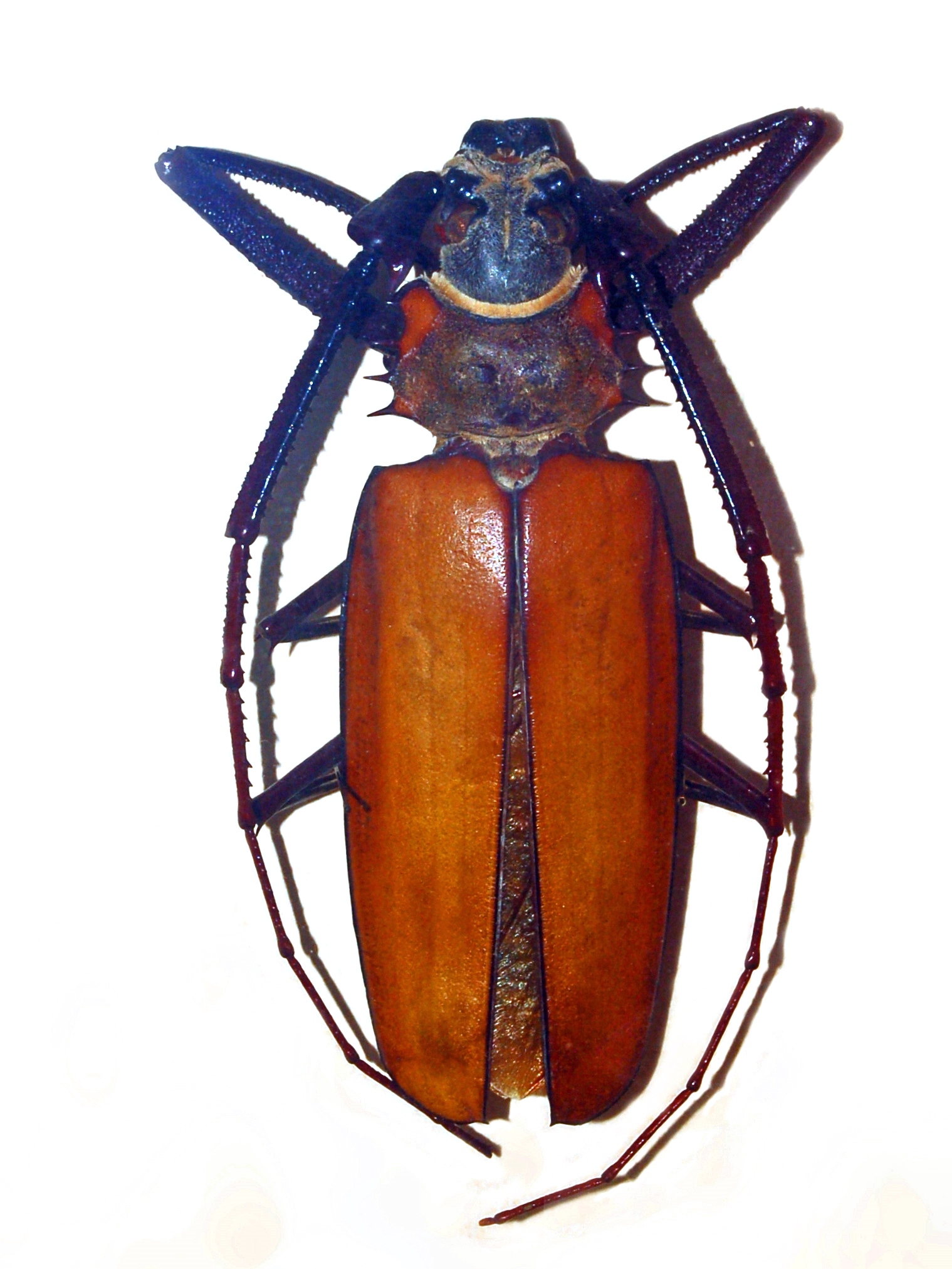
- From Guyana

Scientific classification
- Kingdom: Animalia
- Phylum: Arthropoda
- Clade: Pancrustacea
- Class: Insecta
- Order: Coleoptera
- Suborder: Polyphaga
- Infraorder: Cucujiformia
- Family: Cerambycidae
- Subfamily: Prioninae
- Tribe: Callipogonini
- Genus: Enoplocerus; Audinet-Serville, 1832
- Species: E. armillatus

Binomial name
- Enoplocerus armillatus (Linnaeus, 1767)

Synonyms
- Callipogon (Enoplocerus) armillatus Lameere, 1904; Callipogon armillatus (Linnaeus); Callipogon gigas Csiki, 1909; Cerambyx armillatus Linnaeus, 1767; Prionus armillatus Fabricius, 1775; Prionus octo-dentatus Schoenherr, 1817; Prionus octodentatus Schönherr, 1817; Callipogon armillatum (Linnaeus)

= Enoplocerus =

Enoplocerus armillatus

Species of beetle

Enoplocerus is a genus of longhorn beetles in the subfamily Prioninae of the family Cerambycidae. It is monotypic, being represented by the single species Enoplocerus armillatus, commonly known as the giant longhorn beetle or imperious sawyer.

== Description ==
Enoplocerus armillatus exhibits strong sexual dimorphism and is one of the largest Cerambycids. Females reach a length of 70–80 millimetres (2.8–3.1 in) and males 110–120 millimetres (4.3–4.7 in), but specimens up to 150 millimetres (5.9 in) have been captured. Males have impressive and large mandibles. This species is characterized by very long black antennae, pale brown elytra, quite thick forelegs, and four sharp spines on both sides of the prothorax. It has diurnal habits and it is frugivorous and attracted by tree exudates, while larvae are root borers, feeding on decaying materials.

== Distribution and habitat ==
Enoplocerus armillatus can be found from Costa Rica to Argentina and Brazil. It prefers dry or partially wet areas, at an elevation of about 0–1,200 metres (0–3,937 ft).

== Gallery ==
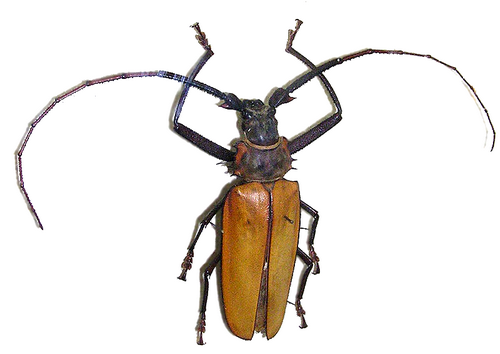
Enoplocerus armillatus at the Museum of Zoology (Saint Petersburg)

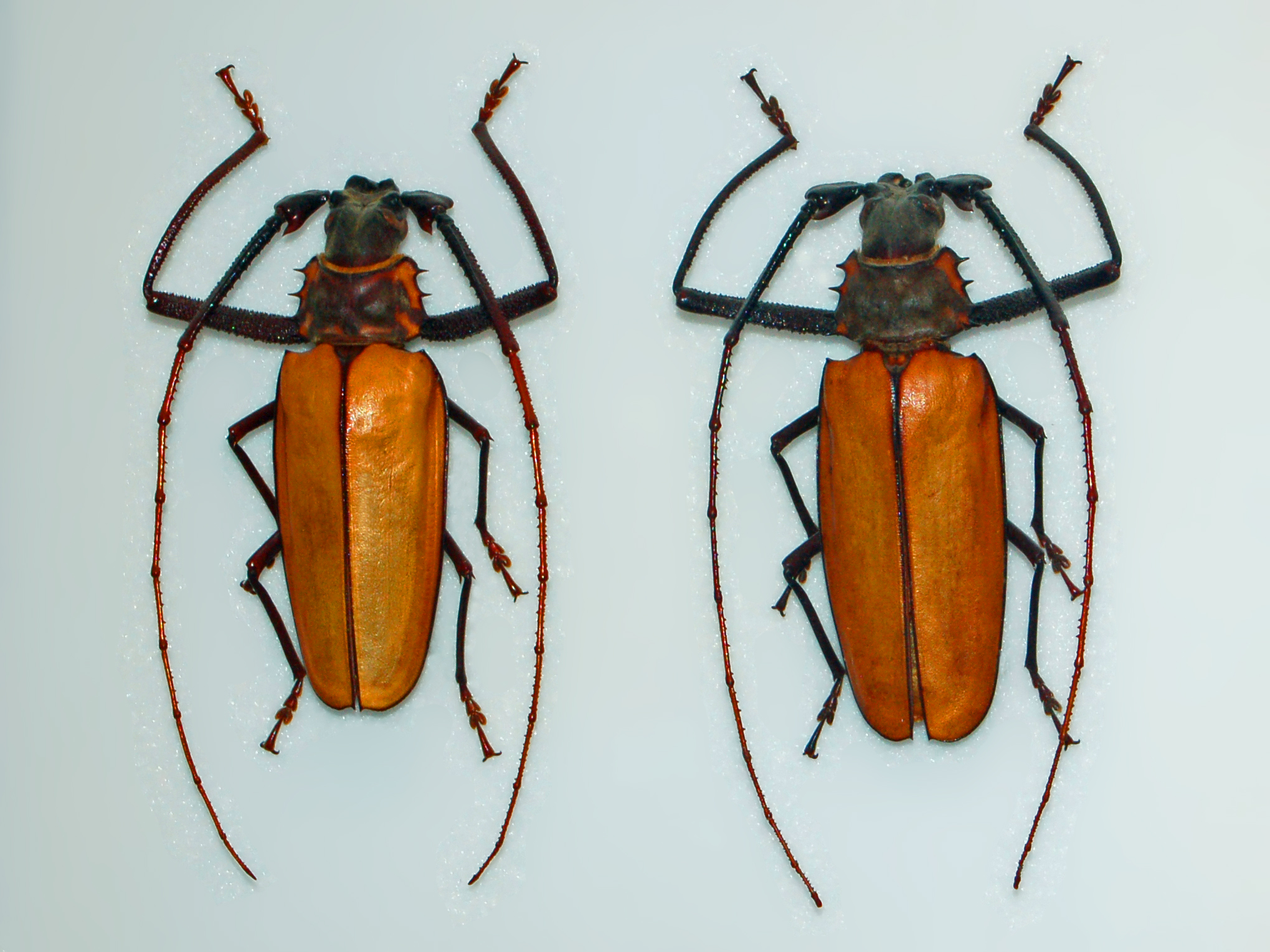
Enoplocerus armillatus at the Montréal Insectarium
