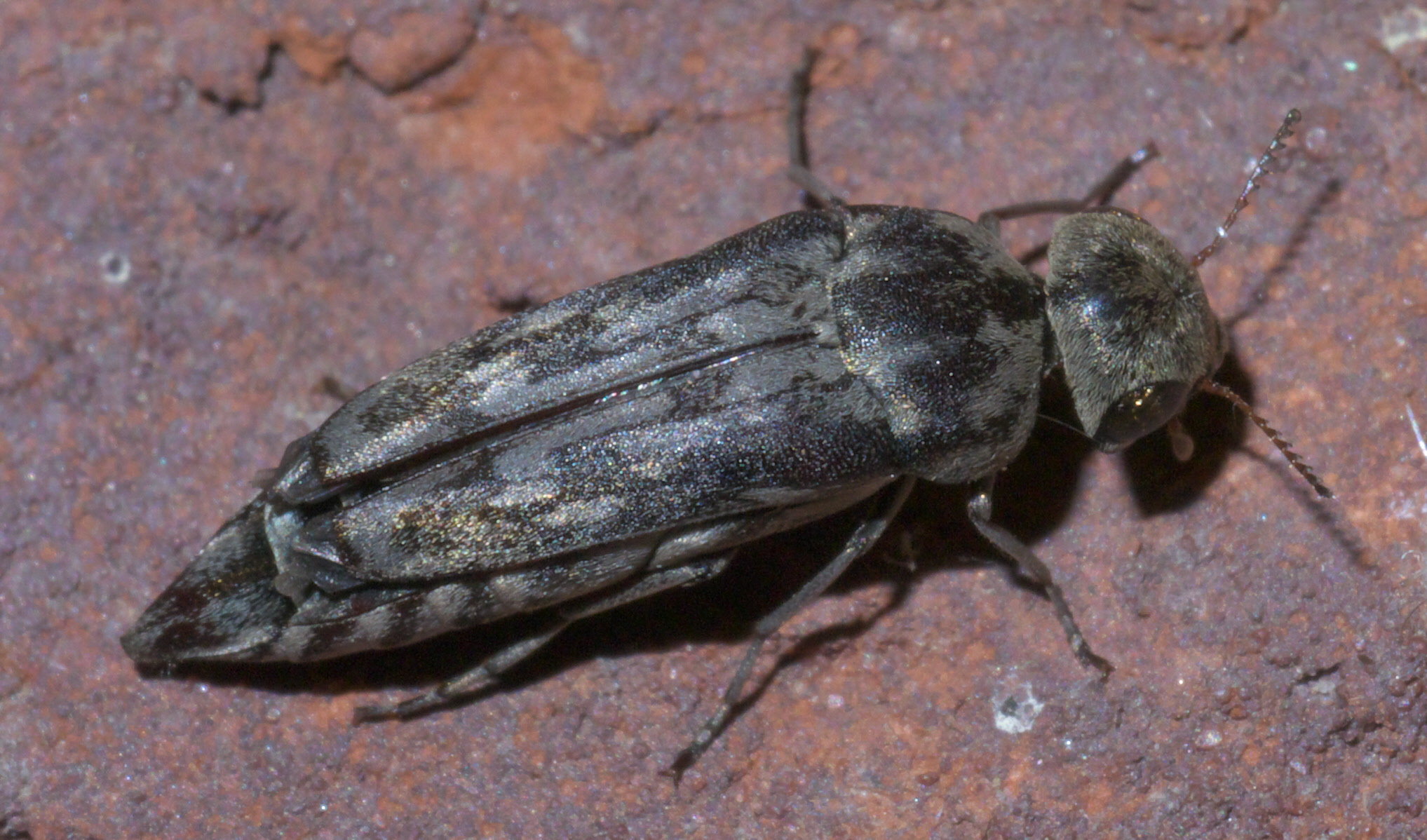

Scientific classification
- Domain: Eukaryota
- Kingdom: Animalia
- Phylum: Arthropoda
- Class: Insecta
- Order: Coleoptera
- Suborder: Polyphaga
- Infraorder: Cucujiformia
- Family: Mordellidae
- Genus: Yakuhananomia
- Species: Y. bidentata

Binomial name
- Yakuhananomia bidentata (Say, 1824)

Synonyms
- Mordella bidentata Say, 1824

= Yakuhananomia bidentata =

Species of beetle

Yakuhananomia bidentata is a species of beetle in the family Mordellidae. It was described in 1824 by Thomas Say. It is found in eastern North America.
