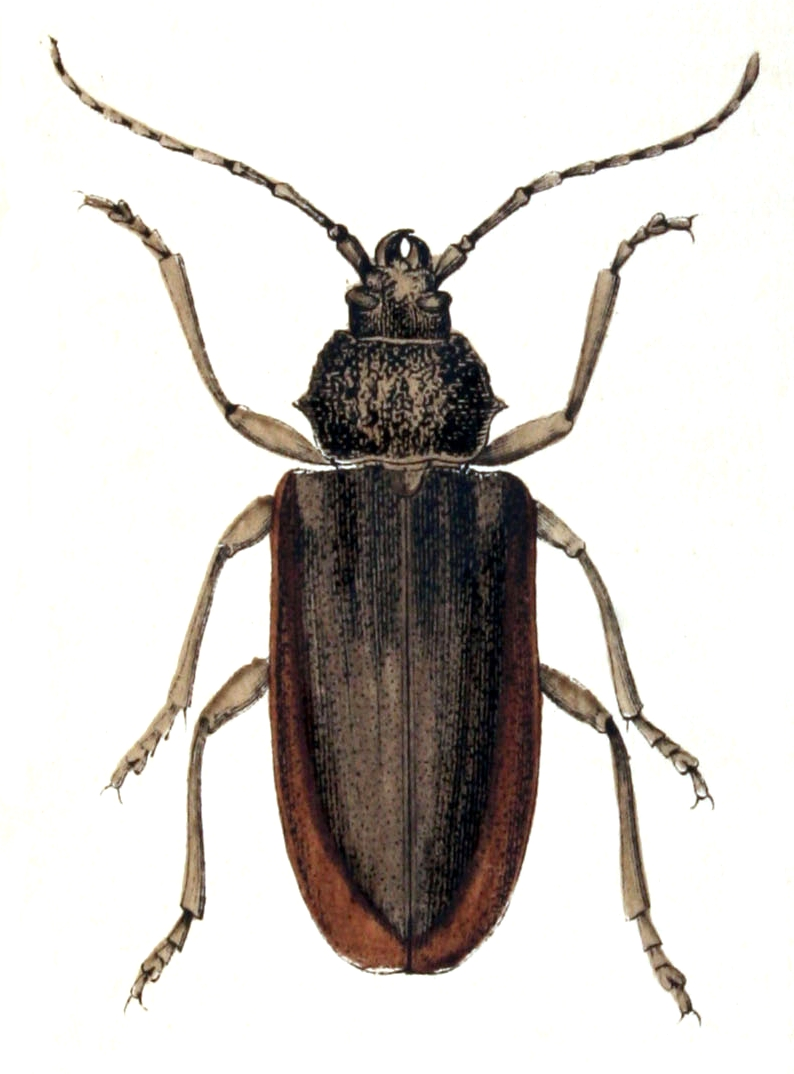

Scientific classification
- Kingdom: Animalia
- Phylum: Arthropoda
- Class: Insecta
- Order: Coleoptera
- Suborder: Polyphaga
- Infraorder: Cucujiformia
- Family: Cerambycidae
- Subfamily: Prioninae
- Tribe: Ergatini
- Genus: Ergates; Audinet-Serville, 1832
- Species: E. faber

Binomial name
- Ergates faber (Linnaeus, 1761)

Synonyms
- (Genus): Cerambyx Gistel 1848; Caratambyx Gistel 1956; (Species): Ergates alkani Demelt 1968; Prionus bulzanensis Laicharting 1784; Prionus crenatus Fabricius 1801; Ergates grandiceps Tournier 1872; Prionus obscurus Olivier 1795; Cerambyx portitor Schrank 1781; Prionus serrarius Panzer 1793

= Ergates faber =

Species of beetle

Ergates faber is a species of beetle belonging to the family Cerambycidae. It is the only species in the monotypic genus Ergates.

It is native to Europe. Larvae feed on sapwood. Development can take between three and twelve years, although pupation occurs over the course of a few weeks in June through July.
