= Macrodontia =

Macrodontia may refer to:

- Macrodontia (tooth), a tooth disorder where the teeth are larger than normal
- Macrodontia (beetle), a genus of beetles

== See also ==
- Macrodonta (disambiguation)
