= Acalodegma vidali =

Scientific classification
- Kingdom: Animalia
- Phylum: Arthropoda
- Clade: Pancrustacea
- Class: Insecta
- Order: Coleoptera
- Suborder: Polyphaga
- Infraorder: Cucujiformia
- Family: Cerambycidae
- Genus: Acalodegma
- Species: A. vidali

Binomial name
- Acalodegma vidali Elgueta & Cerda, 2002

Species of beetle

Acalodegma vidali is a species of beetle in the tribe Macrodontiini. It is native to Chile.
