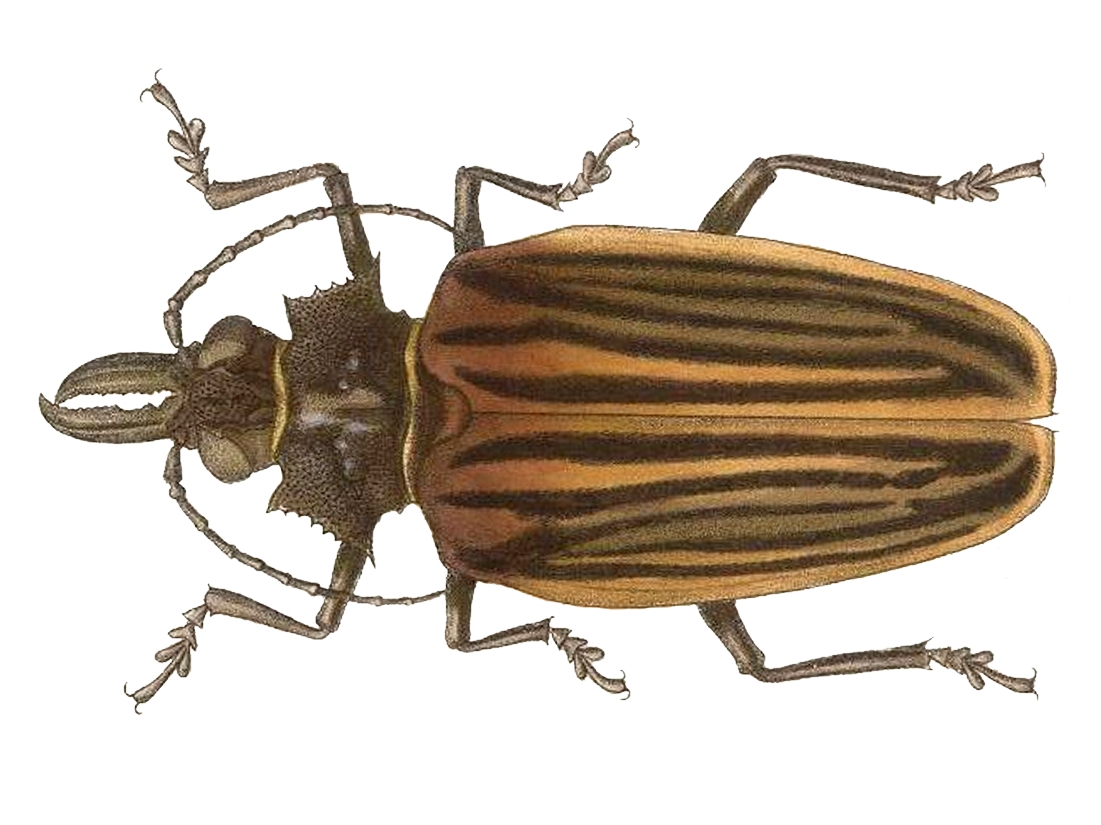

Scientific classification
- Domain: Eukaryota
- Kingdom: Animalia
- Phylum: Arthropoda
- Class: Insecta
- Order: Coleoptera
- Suborder: Polyphaga
- Infraorder: Cucujiformia
- Family: Cerambycidae
- Genus: Macrodontia
- Species: M. batesi

Binomial name
- Macrodontia batesi (Lameere, 1912)

= Macrodontia batesi =

Species of beetle

Macrodontia batesi is a species of long-horned beetle. This species is among the largest beetles, and specimens have been known to exceed 11 centimetres (4.3 in) in length. A fair bit of this length, however, is due to the enormous mandibles.

== Distribution ==
This species is known from the rain forests of Guatemala, Honduras, and Panama. Unconfirmed reports of beetles in the genus Macrodontia have also been recorded in southern Mexico.

Additional described species in the genus extend the overall range of the genus from Guatemala to Argentina.
