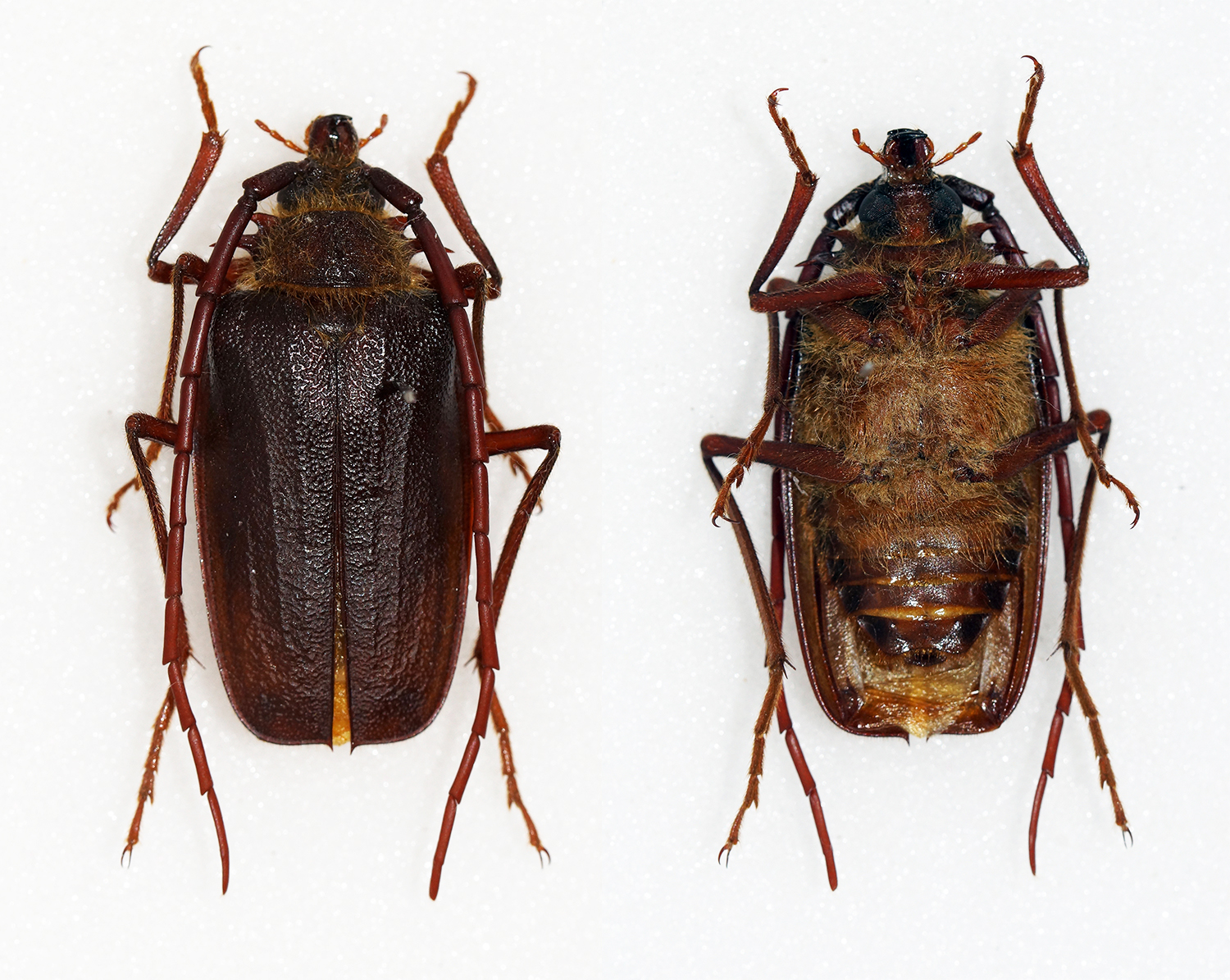
- Acalodegma servillei

Scientific classification
- Kingdom: Animalia
- Phylum: Arthropoda
- Clade: Pancrustacea
- Class: Insecta
- Order: Coleoptera
- Suborder: Polyphaga
- Infraorder: Cucujiformia
- Family: Cerambycidae
- Subfamily: Prioninae
- Tribe: Macrodontiini; Thomson, 1860

Genera
- Acalodegma Thomson, 1877; Acanthinodera Hope, 1835; Ancistrotus Audinet-Serville, 1832; Chalcoprionus Bates, 1875; Macrodontia Lacordaire, 1830

= Macrodontiini =

Tribe of beetles

Macrodontiini is a tribe of beetle in the family Cerambycidae.
