= Chalcoprionus =

Chalcoprionus badeni

Scientific classification
- Kingdom: Animalia
- Phylum: Arthropoda
- Clade: Pancrustacea
- Class: Insecta
- Order: Coleoptera
- Suborder: Polyphaga
- Infraorder: Cucujiformia
- Family: Cerambycidae
- Subfamily: Prioninae
- Tribe: Macrodontiini
- Genus: Chalcoprionus; Bates, 1875
- Species: C. badeni

Binomial name
- Chalcoprionus badeni Bates, 1875

Genus of beetles

Chalcoprionus is a genus of longhorn beetles in the family Cerambycidae. It is monotypic, being represented by the single species, Chalcoprionus badeni.
