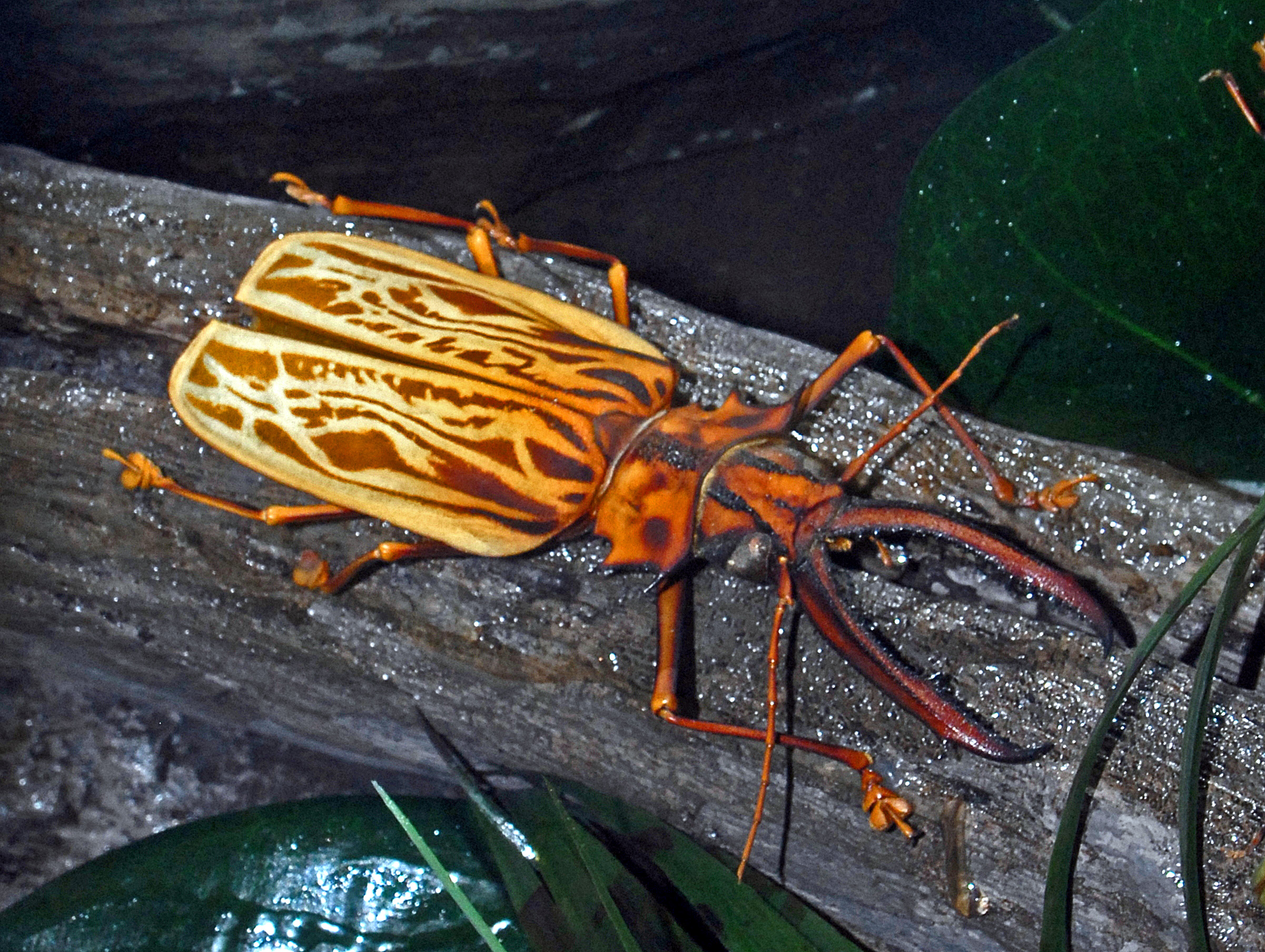
- Mounted specimen at the Museo Civico di Storia Naturale di Milano

Conservation status
- Vulnerable (IUCN 2.3)

Scientific classification
- Kingdom: Animalia
- Phylum: Arthropoda
- Class: Insecta
- Order: Coleoptera
- Suborder: Polyphaga
- Infraorder: Cucujiformia
- Family: Cerambycidae
- Genus: Macrodontia
- Species: M. cervicornis

Binomial name
- Macrodontia cervicornis (Linnaeus, 1758)

= Macrodontia cervicornis =

Species of beetle

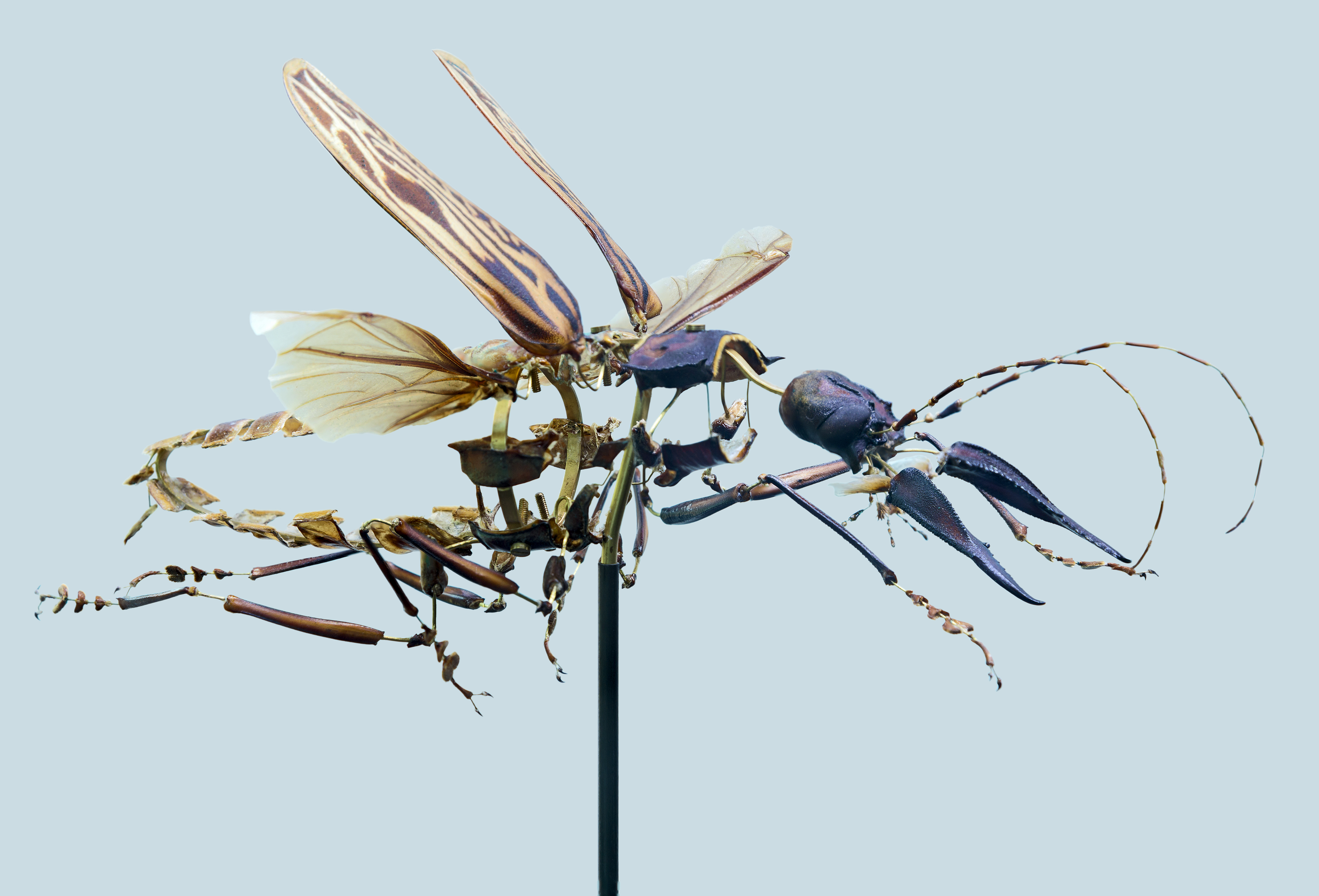
Male, Beauchêne disarticulation, MHNT

Macrodontia cervicornis (Linnaeus, 1758), also known as the sabertooth longhorn beetle, is one of the largest beetles, if one allows for the enormous mandibles of the males, from which it derives both of the names in its binomen: Macrodontia means "long tooth", and cervicornis means "deer antler". Measurements of insect length normally exclude legs, jaws, or horns, but if jaws are included, the longest known specimen of M. cervicornis is 17.7 cm; the longest known specimen of Dynastes hercules, a beetle species with enormous horns, is 17.5 cm, and the longest known beetle excluding either jaws or horns is Titanus giganteus, at 16.7 cm.

Most of this species' life is spent in the larval stage, which can last up to 10 years, while its adult phase is likely to last no more than a few months during which time dispersal and reproduction take place. The female lays eggs under the bark of dead or dying softwood trees, and once hatched, the larvae burrow into the rotting wood, creating extensive galleries over a metre long and 10 cm wide.

== Distribution ==
This species is known from the rain forests of Colombia, Ecuador, Peru, Bolivia, the Guianas, and Brazil.
