= Ancistrotus aduncus =

Scientific classification
- Kingdom: Animalia
- Phylum: Arthropoda
- Class: Insecta
- Order: Coleoptera
- Suborder: Polyphaga
- Infraorder: Cucujiformia
- Family: Cerambycidae
- Genus: Ancistrotus
- Species: A. aduncus

Binomial name
- Ancistrotus aduncus Buquet 1853

Species of beetle

Ancistrotus aduncus is a species of beetle in the family Cerambycidae. It is endemic to Brazil, specifically southeast Espírito Santo, Rio de Janeiro and Minas Gerais.
