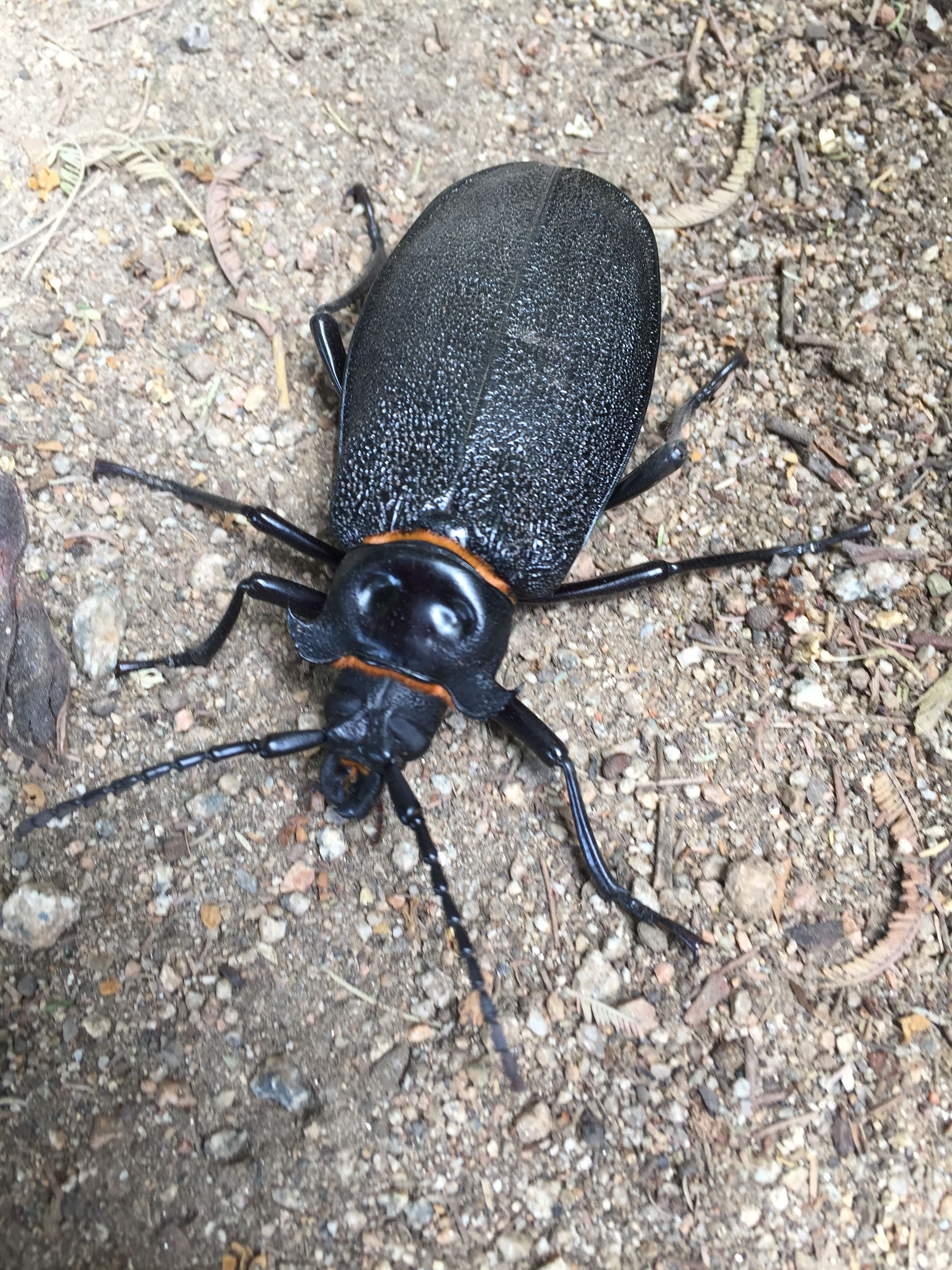

Scientific classification
- Kingdom: Animalia
- Phylum: Arthropoda
- Clade: Pancrustacea
- Class: Insecta
- Order: Coleoptera
- Suborder: Polyphaga
- Infraorder: Cucujiformia
- Family: Cerambycidae
- Subfamily: Prioninae
- Tribe: Macrodontiini
- Genus: Acanthinodera; Dupont 1835
- Species: A. cumingii

Binomial name
- Acanthinodera cumingii Hope, 1833

Synonyms
- List: Acanthinodera cumigii Jeniš; Acanthinodera cumingi Bleuzen; Acanthinodera cumingii Elgueta & Cerda; Acanthinodera cummingi Barriga & al., 1993; Acanthinodera cummingii Arias, 2000; Amallopodes scabrosus Blanchard, 1851; Ancistrotus cumingi Angulo & Weigart, 1974; Ancistrotus cummingi Cekalovic, 1967; Malloderes microcephalus Berge, 1844; Malloderus microcephalus Drapiez, 1841; Prionus cumingii Hope, 1833; Prionus mercurius Berge, 1844

= Acanthinodera =

Genus of beetle

Acanthinodera is a genus of longhorned beetles in the family Cerambycidae. It is monotypic, being represented by the single species Acanthinodera cumingii. It is the largest species of beetle in Chile. The beetle is endemic to central Chile and can be found from IV Coquimbo Region to IX La Araucanía Region.

== Description ==
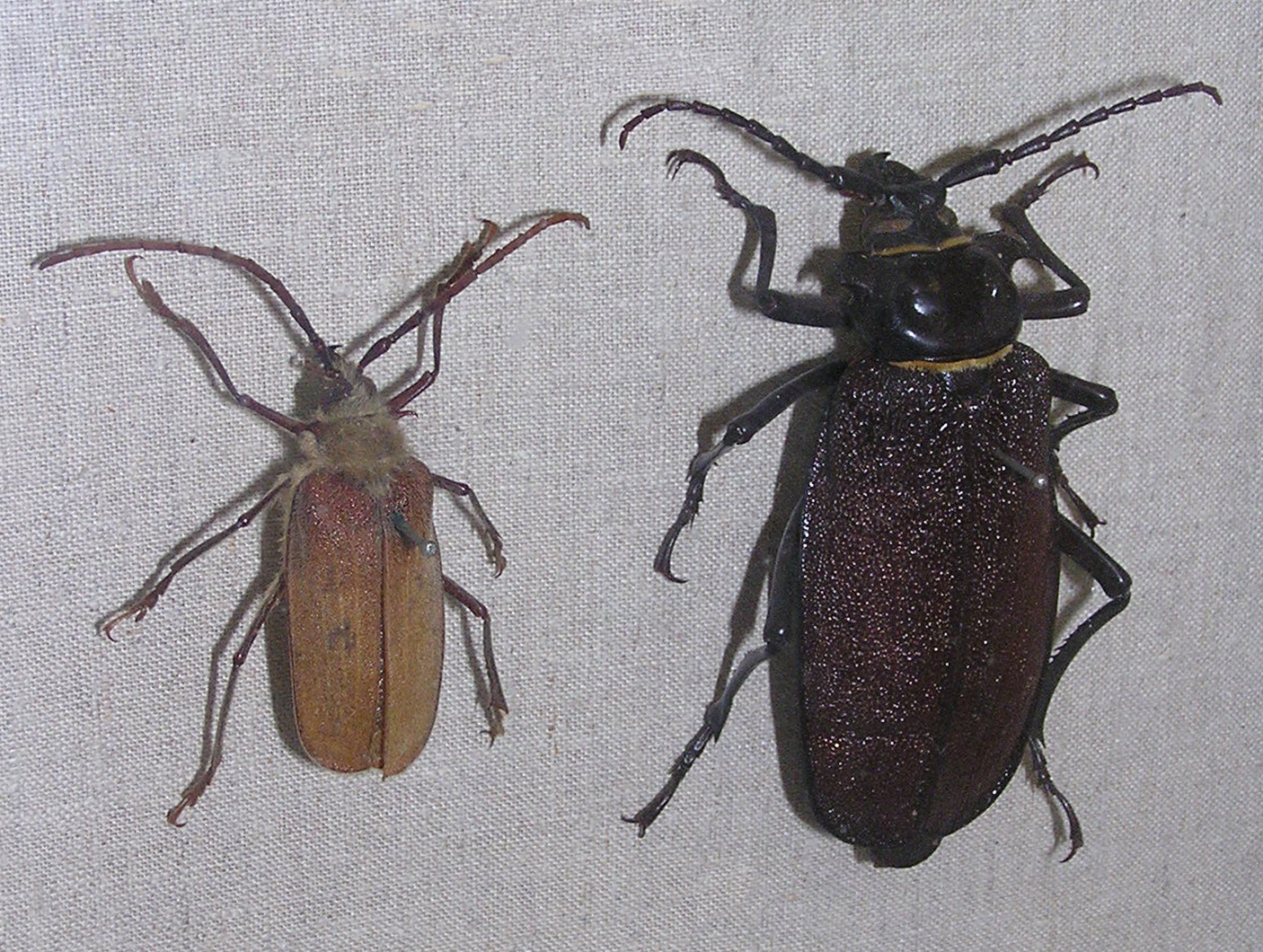
The male (left) is smaller and lighter colored than the female.

The species has a particularly marked sexual dimorphism, which originally led naturalists to classify the male and female as distinct species. The male measures 5–6 cm, is light brown and furry. The female is black and measures between 8–9 cm on average, although specimens exceeding 12 cm in length have also been found. The male is nocturnal and can fly, but the female is diurnal and does not fly.

The insects produce a hissing sound when disturbed that they generate by rubbing their rear legs along the edge of the wing covers. Although they are slow-moving and non-aggressive, they can deliver a powerful bite if provoked. Their legs are powerful and tipped with large claws, they are very difficult to remove from surfaces on which they can gain good purchase; this includes tree bark, clothes and skin.

== Distribution ==
The species is endemic to Chile, and can be found from the south of the Region of Coquimbo to the Malleco Province in the Region of Araucanía. It can be found from sea level to the Precordillera hills.

== Life cycle ==
The life cycle of A. cumingii has been little studied. The females lay more than 100 white eggs resembling grains of rice in the dry trunks of trees and in decomposing vegetation. The length of time between eggs and adulthood can take six years, depending on humidity and food availability. Larva can reach sizes as large as 13 cm in length. For this reason the common name of the insect is "the mother of the snake" in Spanish.

The insect plays an important ecosystem role in decomposition of dead wood. The larval stage has been found living in approximately 30 species of trees, both indigenous and invasive. This includes Eucalyptus which is an invasive tree in Chile.

== Threats ==
The insects are occasionally preyed upon by mammalian carnivores, such as foxes. However, the strong jaws of the insect, used for eating wood, may provide a defense.

== Conservation ==
In its native habitat in Chile the insect is vulnerable to habitat destruction from logging and construction. Due to its large size, the beetle is also vulnerable to being caught and killed by people, exacerbating the danger of extinction.
