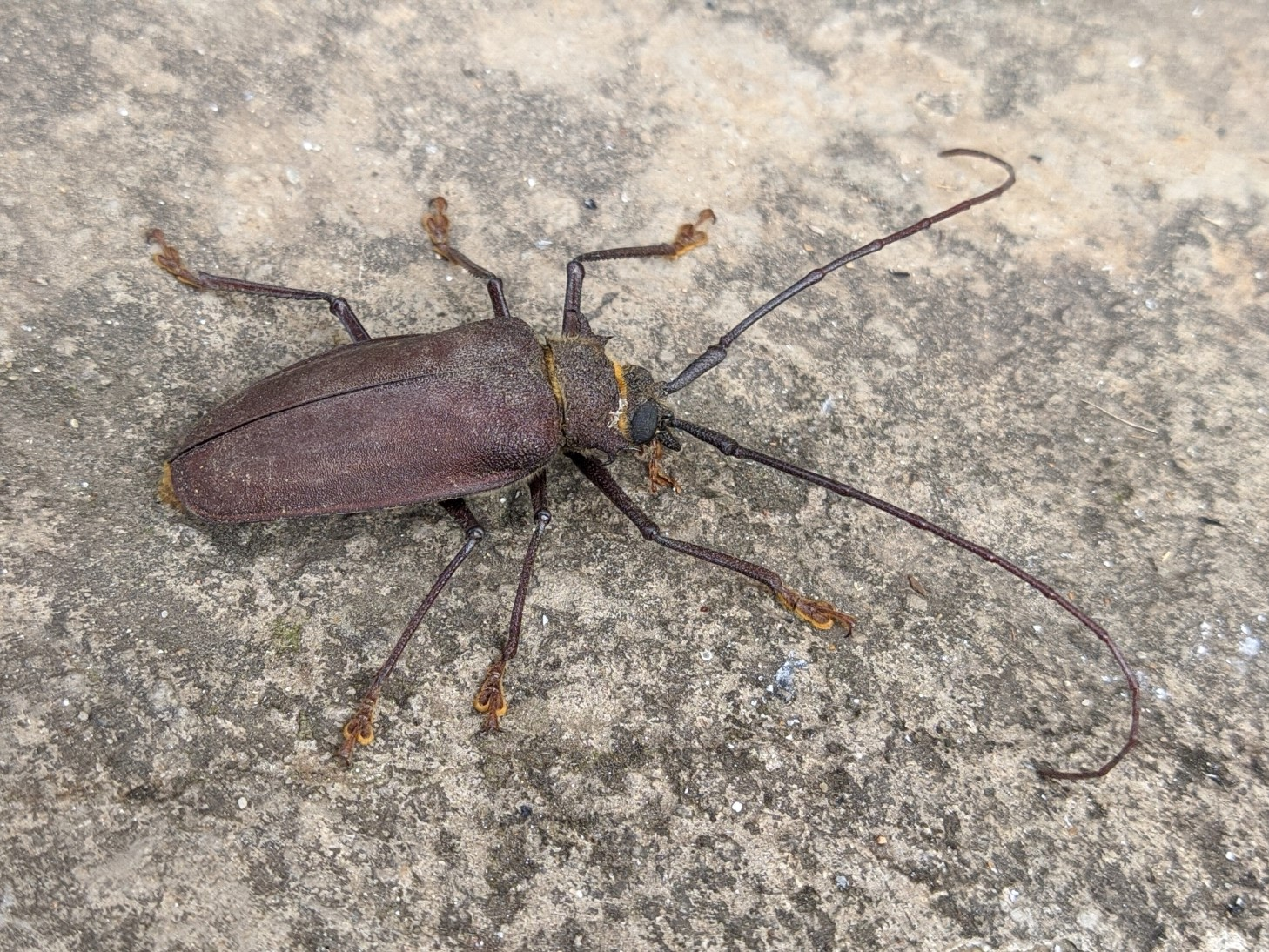

Scientific classification
- Kingdom: Animalia
- Phylum: Arthropoda
- Class: Insecta
- Order: Coleoptera
- Suborder: Polyphaga
- Infraorder: Cucujiformia
- Family: Cerambycidae
- Genus: Ancistrotus
- Species: A. uncinatus

Binomial name
- Ancistrotus uncinatus (Klug, 1825)

Synonyms
- Ancistrotus hamaticollis Audinet-Serville, 1832

= Ancistrotus uncinatus =

Species of beetle

Ancistrotus uncinatus is a species of beetle in the family Cerambycidae. It is endemic to Brazil, specifically southeast Minas Gerais and Santa Catarina.
