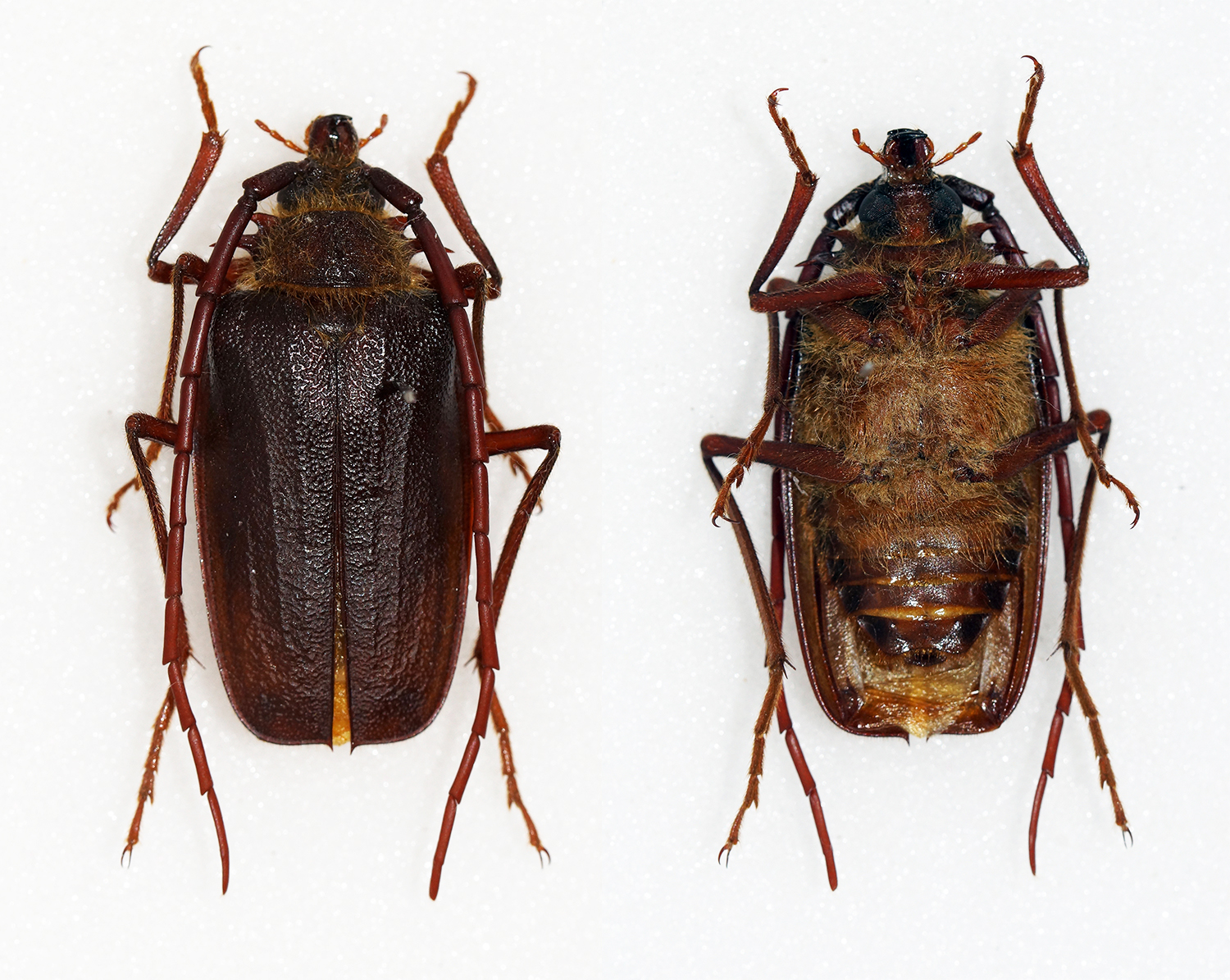
- Acalodegma servillei

Scientific classification
- Kingdom: Animalia
- Phylum: Arthropoda
- Clade: Pancrustacea
- Class: Insecta
- Order: Coleoptera
- Suborder: Polyphaga
- Infraorder: Cucujiformia
- Family: Cerambycidae
- Subfamily: Prioninae
- Tribe: Macrodontiini
- Genus: Acalodegma; Thomson, 1877

Species
- Acalodegma servillei (Blanchard, 1851); Acalodegma vidali Elgueta & Cerda, 2002

= Acalodegma =

Genus of beetles

Acalodegma is a genus of beetle in the family Cerambycidae.
