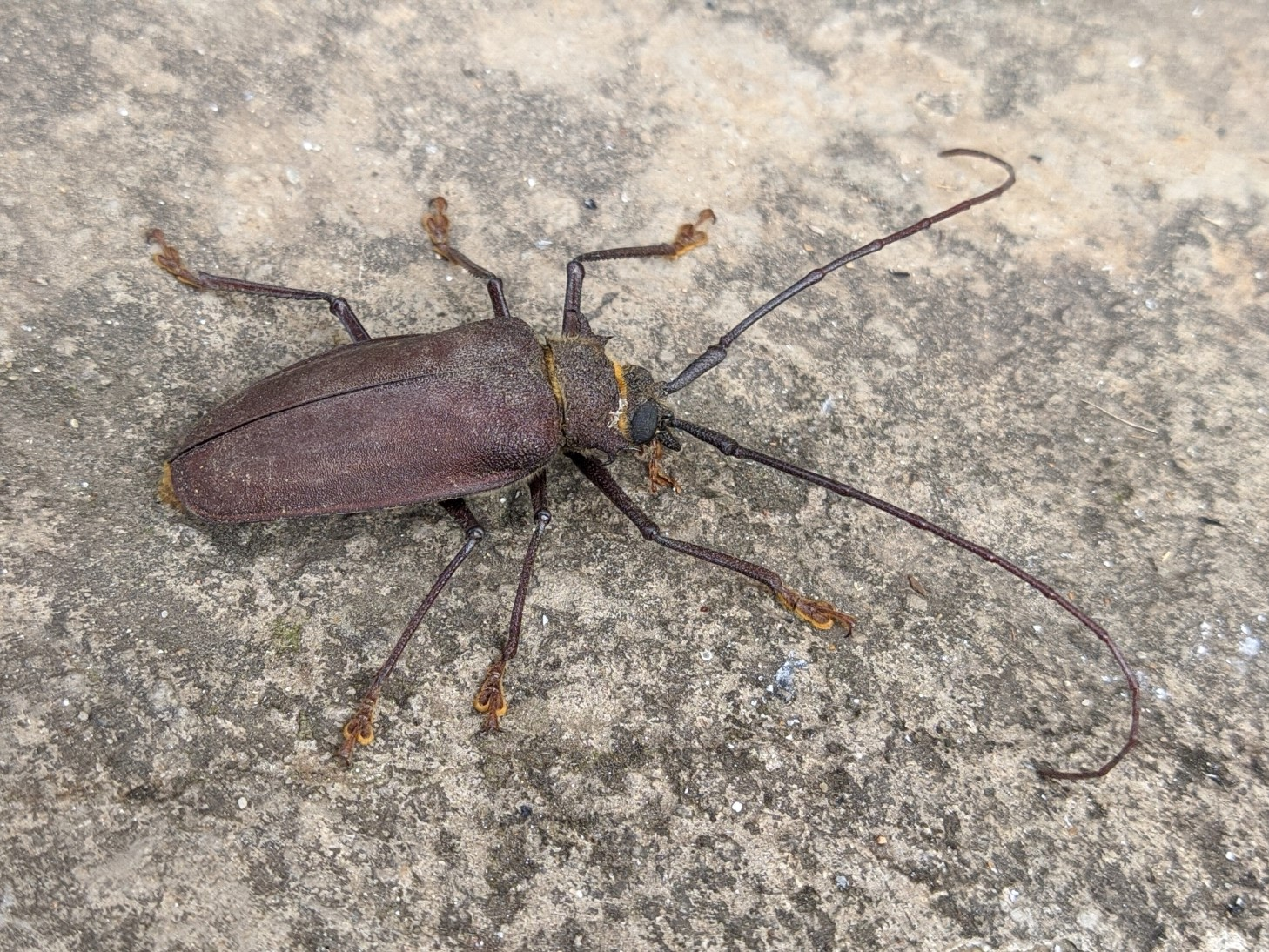
- Ancistrotus uncinatus

Scientific classification
- Kingdom: Animalia
- Phylum: Arthropoda
- Clade: Pancrustacea
- Class: Insecta
- Order: Coleoptera
- Suborder: Polyphaga
- Infraorder: Cucujiformia
- Family: Cerambycidae
- Tribe: Macrodontiini
- Genus: Ancistrotus; Audinet-Serville 1832

= Ancistrotus =

Genus of beetles

Ancistrotus is a genus of beetles in the family Cerambycidae, containing the following species:

- Ancistrotus aduncus Buquet, 1853
- Ancistrotus uncinatus (Klug, 1825)
