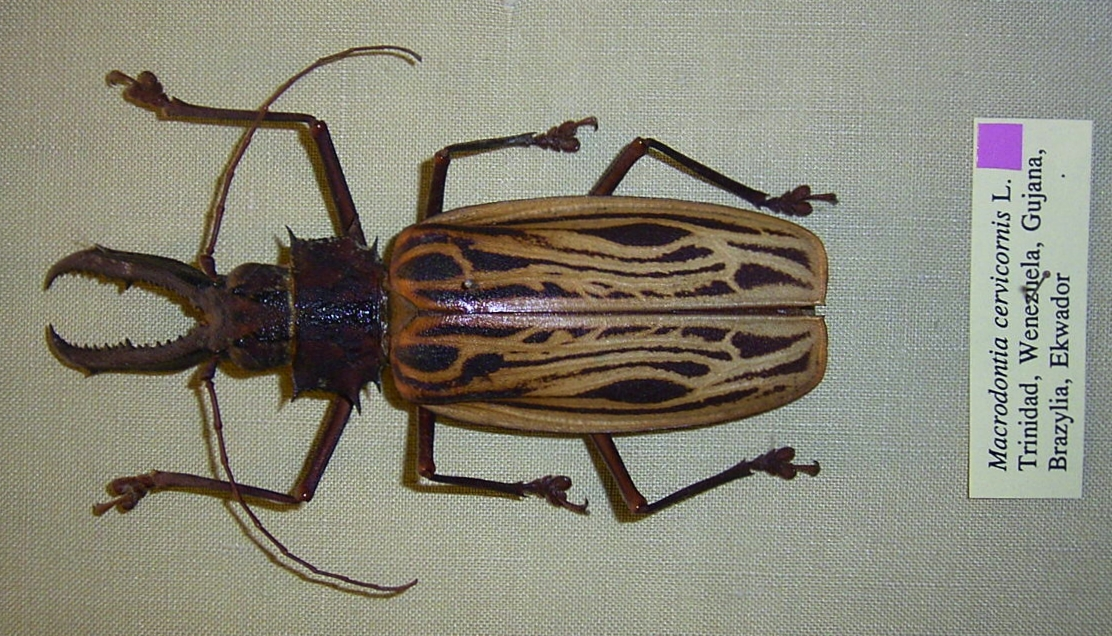

Scientific classification
- Kingdom: Animalia
- Phylum: Arthropoda
- Clade: Pancrustacea
- Class: Insecta
- Order: Coleoptera
- Suborder: Polyphaga
- Infraorder: Cucujiformia
- Family: Cerambycidae
- Subfamily: Prioninae
- Tribe: Macrodontiini
- Genus: Macrodontia; Lepeletier & Audinet-Serville, 1830

= Macrodontia (beetle) =

Genus of beetles

Macrodontia is an American genus of long-horned beetles remarkable for their large size and for the large mandibles of the males in particular.

== Taxonomy ==
The genus Macrodontia Lepeletier, Audinet-Serville & Lacordaire, 1830 is in some documents credited to Latreille as the authority, but this appears to be an error, possibly due to confusion arising from Latreille having been the authority for the subfamily Prioninae and the family Cerambycidae. It is a genus within the family Cerambycidae, subfamily Prioninae, tribe Macrodontiini.

The following species are recognised in the genus Macrodontia:

- Macrodontia antonkozlovi Santos-Silva, 2016
- Macrodontia batesi Lameere, 1912
- Macrodontia castroi Marazzi, Pavesi & Marazzi, 2008
- Macrodontia cervicornis (Linnaeus, 1758)
- Macrodontia crenata (Olivier, 1795)
- Macrodontia dejeanii Gory, 1839
- Macrodontia flavipennis Chevrolat, 1833
- Macrodontia itayensis Simoëns, 2006
- Macrodontia jolyi Bleuzen, 1994
- Macrodontia marechali Bleuzen, 1990
- Macrodontia mathani Pouillaude, 1915
- Macrodontia zischkai Tippmann, 1960

== Description ==
The species are large. Some are giants among insects, with occasional specimens more than 17 cm long. The habitus is fairly typical of the Cerambycidae, except for the enormous jaws of the males: elongated, more or less parallel-sided beetles with dorsiventrally flattened bodies, generally all brown or orange with longitudinal dark striping. The males are larger than the females and generally have enormous jaws, from which the generic name presumably derives: from the Greek μάκρος (makros) meaning "long or large" and ὀδόντος, (odontos) meaning "of a tooth".

In contrast, in proportion to the beetles' size, the antennae are shorter than those of typical Cerambycidae.

== Distribution ==
The genus was originally described from South America, but the 11 currently recognised species variously range from regions between Guatemala at the north of Central America, or even Southern Mexico, to Argentina in South America.
