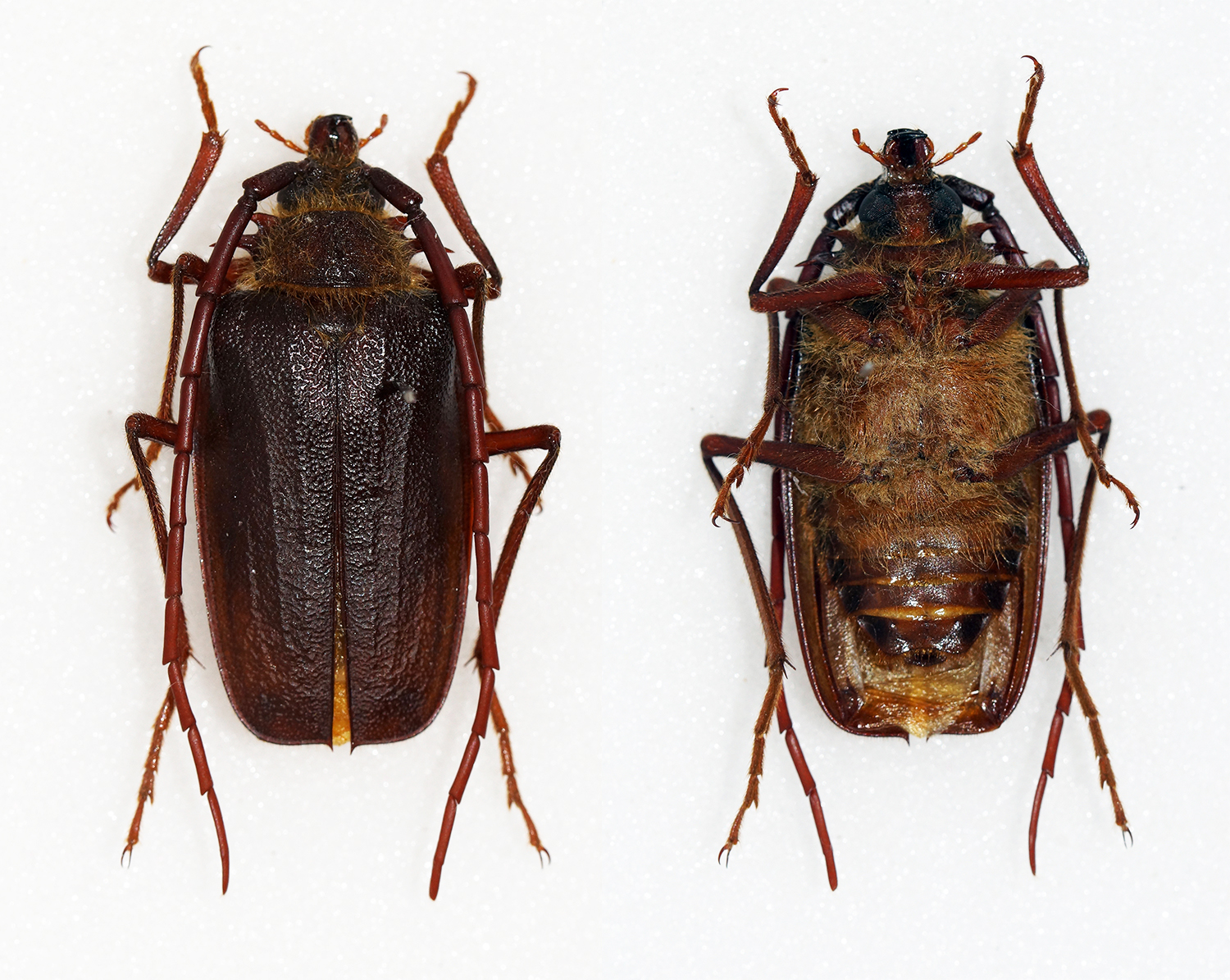
- Blanchard,1851 Sex: Male Data: 25-12-14 - San Alfonso 2500m - Chile Size: 28mm

Scientific classification
- Kingdom: Animalia
- Phylum: Arthropoda
- Clade: Pancrustacea
- Class: Insecta
- Order: Coleoptera
- Suborder: Polyphaga
- Infraorder: Cucujiformia
- Family: Cerambycidae
- Genus: Acalodegma
- Species: A. servillei

Binomial name
- Acalodegma servillei (Blanchard, 1851)

= Acalodegma servillei =

Species of beetles

Acalodegma servillei is a species of beetle in the family Cerambycidae.
