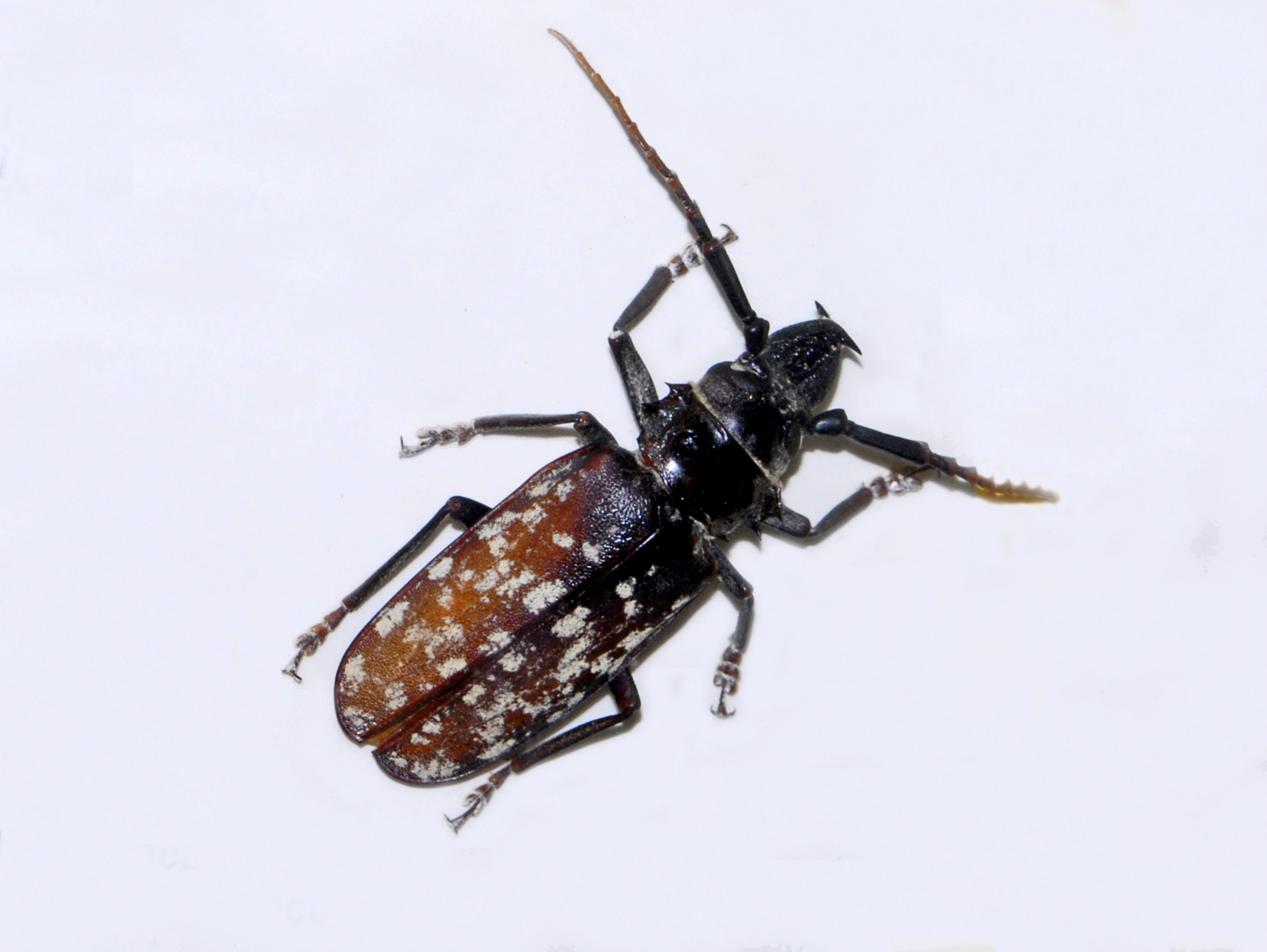
- Museum specimen

Scientific classification
- Kingdom: Animalia
- Phylum: Arthropoda
- Class: Insecta
- Order: Coleoptera
- Suborder: Polyphaga
- Infraorder: Cucujiformia
- Family: Cerambycidae
- Genus: Tithoes
- Species: T. maculatus

Binomial name
- Tithoes maculatus (Fabricius, 1793)

Synonyms
- List: Prionus maculatus Olivier in Fabricius, 1793; Prionus maculatus Olivier, 1795; Acanthophorus maculatus Audinet-Serville, 1832; Tithoes maculatus Thomson, 1864; Tithoës maculatus Harold, 1879; Acanthophorus (Tithoes) maculatus Lameere, 1903; Acanthophorus (Tithoes) maculatus subsp. yolofus Lepesme, 1953; Acanthophorus maculatus subsp. maculatus Basilewsky, 1955; Tithoes maculatus subsp. maculatus Adlbauer & Mourglia, 1995; Tithoes (Tithoes) maculatus subsp. maculatus Quentin & Villiers, 1983

= Tithoes maculatus =

Species of beetle

Tithoes maculatus is a species of beetle belonging to the family Cerambycidae.

== Description ==
Tithoes maculatus can reach a length of 38–88 millimetres (1.5–3.5 in). Head and thorax are blackish, while elytra are brown, with whitish blotches. Males of this longicorn beetle has a very large head and long, strong, falciform mandibles. Three spiny teeth are present on both lateral edges of prothorax.

== Distribution ==
This species is widespread in Angola, Benin, Burkina Faso, Cameroon, Central African Republic, Côte d'Ivoire, Gabon, Gambia, Guinea Bissau, Mali, Niger, Nigeria, Rwanda, Senegal, Sudan, Chad and Togo.

== Subspecies ==
- Tithoes maculatus centralus Lameere, 1903
- Tithoes maculatus maculatus Olivier, 1975
