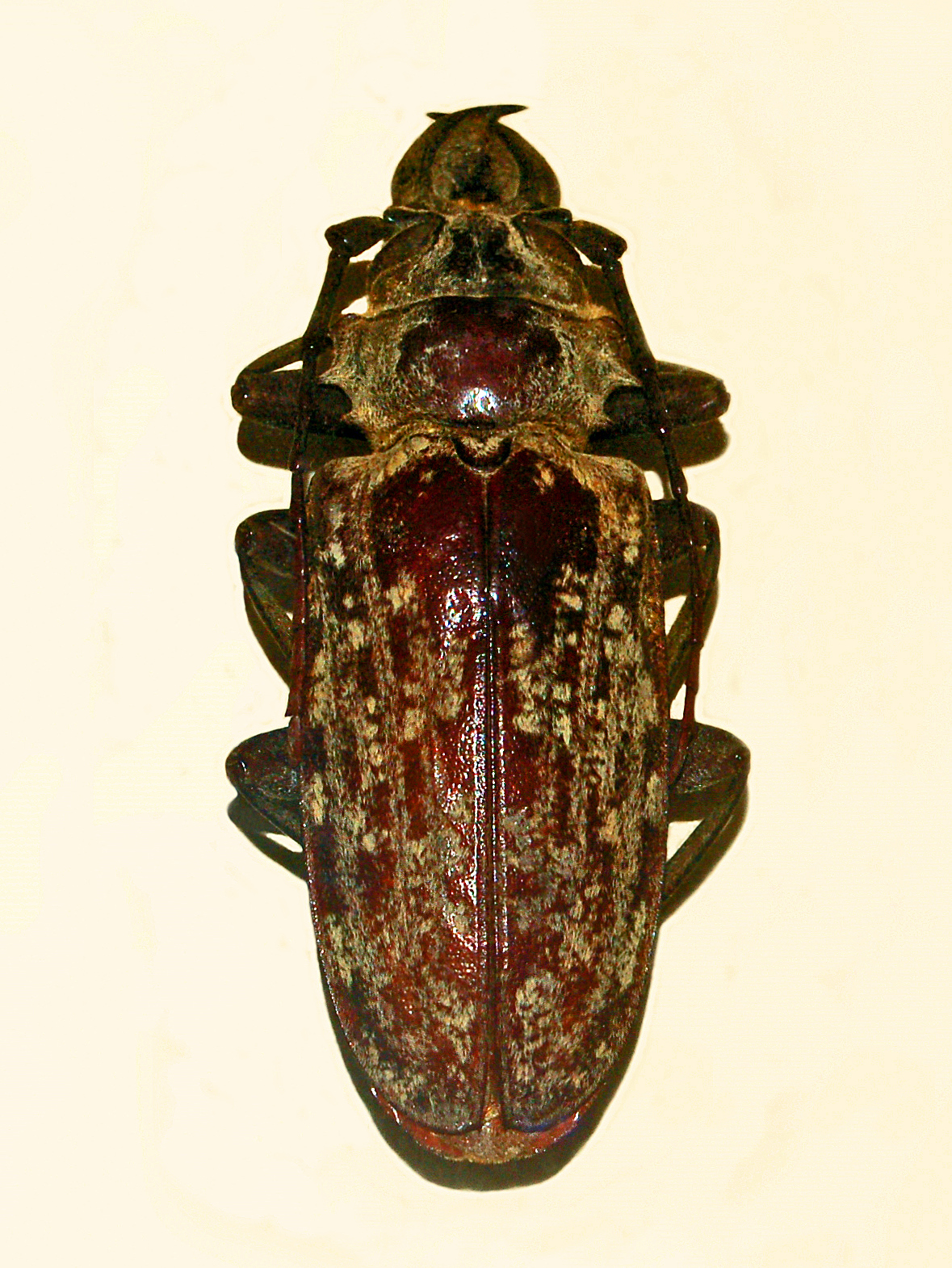
- From western Africa

Scientific classification
- Domain: Eukaryota
- Kingdom: Animalia
- Phylum: Arthropoda
- Class: Insecta
- Order: Coleoptera
- Suborder: Polyphaga
- Infraorder: Cucujiformia
- Family: Cerambycidae
- Genus: Tithoes
- Species: T. confinis

Binomial name
- Tithoes confinis (Laporte de Castelnau, 1840)

Synonyms
- List: Acanthophorus confinis Laporte de Castelnau, 1840; Tithoes crassipes Quedenfeldt, 1882; Tithoes falcatus Kolbe, 1898; Tithoes gnatho Kolbe, 1898; Tithoes gularis Kolbe, 1898; Tithoes intermedius Thomson, 1877; Tithoes longicornis Kolbe, 1898; Tithoes mandibularis Thomson, 1877; Acanthophorus maculatus (Fabricius) Gerstaecker, 1862

= Tithoes confinis =

Species of beetle

Tithoes confinis, common name giant longhorn beetle, is a species of beetle of the family Cerambycidae.

== Description ==
Tithoes confinis can reach a length of 55–100 millimetres (2.2–3.9 in). This beetle has a massive hairy body and strong mandibles. The basic colour is dark brown. Pronotum bears two spines on both edges. Adults are nocturnal. Larvae feed on cashew nut trees (Anacardium occidentale) and other trees of the family Anacardiaceae.

== Distribution ==
This widespread species can be found in forests through most of the continental Afrotropics (Djibouti, Ethiopia, Kenya, Malawi, Mozambique, Somalia, South Africa, Tanzania, Uganda, Zambia and Zimbabwe).
