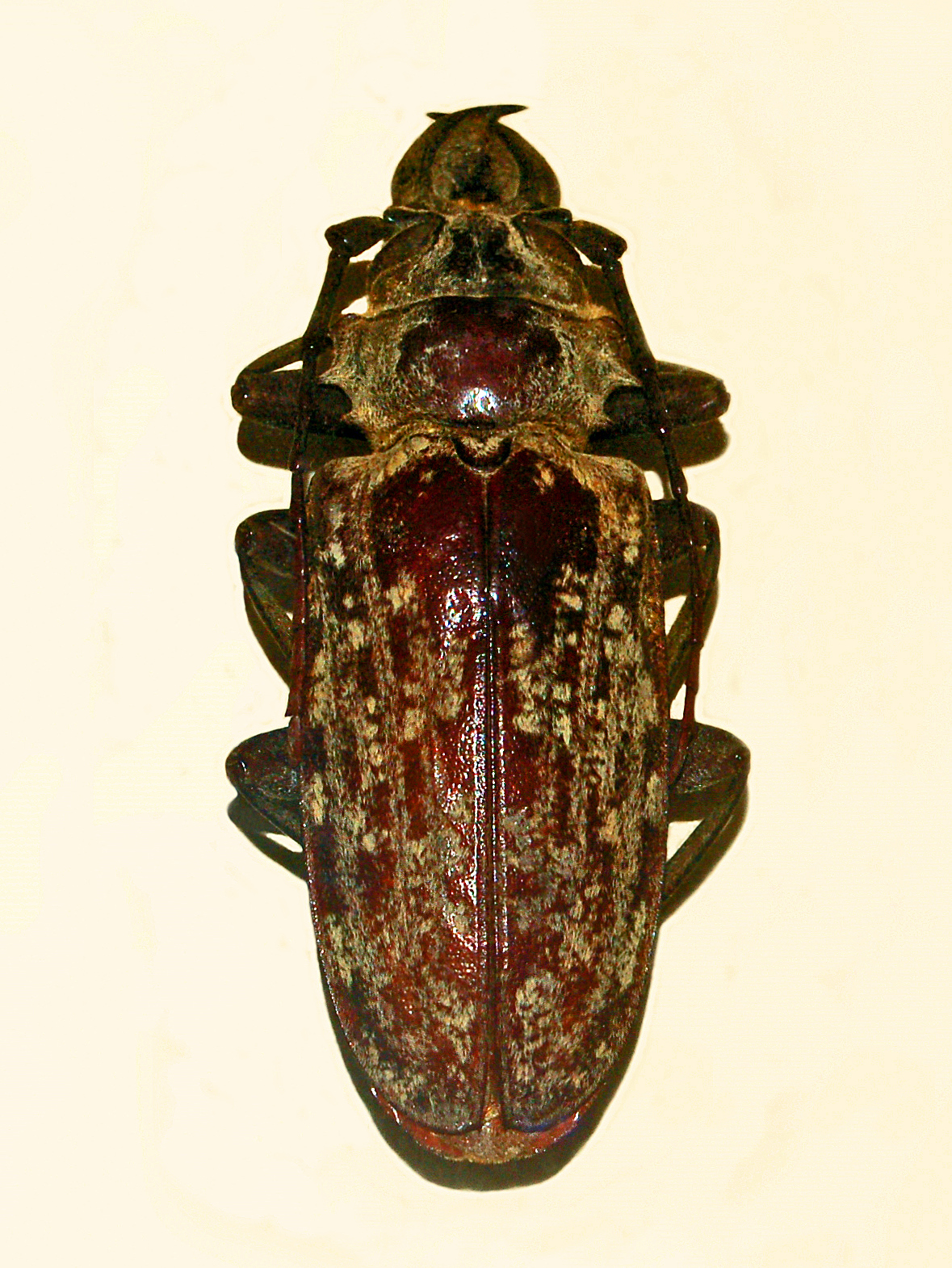
- Tithoes confinis

Scientific classification
- Domain: Eukaryota
- Kingdom: Animalia
- Phylum: Arthropoda
- Class: Insecta
- Order: Coleoptera
- Suborder: Polyphaga
- Infraorder: Cucujiformia
- Family: Cerambycidae
- Subfamily: Prioninae
- Tribe: Acanthophorini
- Genus: Tithoes; Thomson, 1864

= Tithoes =

Genus of beetles

Tithoes is a genus of beetles belonging to the family Cerambycidae.

== Species ==
The following species are recognised in the genus Tithoes:

- Tithoes confinis (Laporte de Castelnau, 1840)
- Tithoes congolanus (Lameere, 1903)
- Tithoes digennaroi Bouyer, 2016
- Tithoes drumonti Bouyer, 2016
- Tithoes frontalis Harold, 1879
- Tithoes hassoni Bouyer, 2016
- Tithoes maculatus (Fabricius, 1792)
- Tithoes morettoi Bouyer, 2016
- Tithoes orientalis (Lameere, 1903)
- Tithoes somalius (Lameere, 1903)
- Tithoes yolofus (Dalman, 1817)
