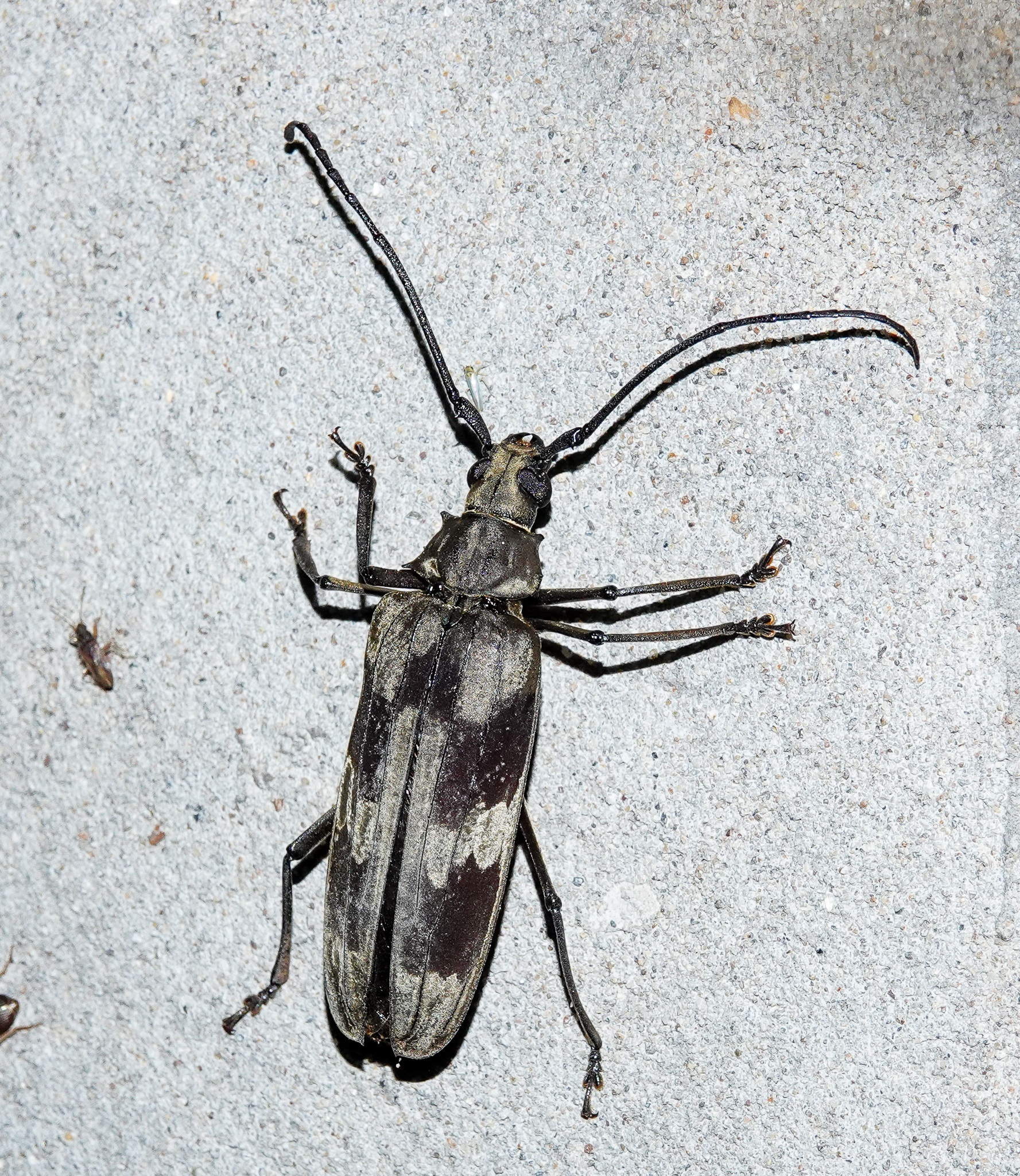
- Baralipton maculosum, India

Scientific classification
- Domain: Eukaryota
- Kingdom: Animalia
- Phylum: Arthropoda
- Class: Insecta
- Order: Coleoptera
- Suborder: Polyphaga
- Infraorder: Cucujiformia
- Family: Cerambycidae
- Subfamily: Prioninae
- Tribe: Aegosomatini
- Genus: Baralipton; Thomson, 1857

Type species
- Baralipton maculosum Thomson, 1857

= Baralipton (beetle) =

Genus of beetles

Baralipton is a genus of prionine beetles in the family Cerambycidae. There are at least four described species in Baralipton.

== Species ==
These four species belong to the genus Baralipton:

- Baralipton cheworum Komiya, 2003 (Borneo)
- Baralipton dohrni (Lameere, 1909) (Sri Lanka)
- Baralipton maculosum Thomson, 1857 (China, India, southern Asia)
- Baralipton severini (Lameere, 1909) (Indonesia, Sumatra, Malaysia)
