= Baralipton dohrni =

Scientific classification
- Kingdom: Animalia
- Phylum: Arthropoda
- Class: Insecta
- Order: Coleoptera
- Suborder: Polyphaga
- Infraorder: Cucujiformia
- Family: Cerambycidae
- Subfamily: Prioninae
- Tribe: Aegosomatini
- Genus: Baralipton
- Species: B. dohrni

Binomial name
- Baralipton dohrni (Lameere, 1909)

Synonyms
- Megopis dohrni Lameere, 1909

Species of beetle

Baralipton dohrni is a species of longhorn beetle endemic to Sri Lanka.

Maximum size recorded is 24 mm.
