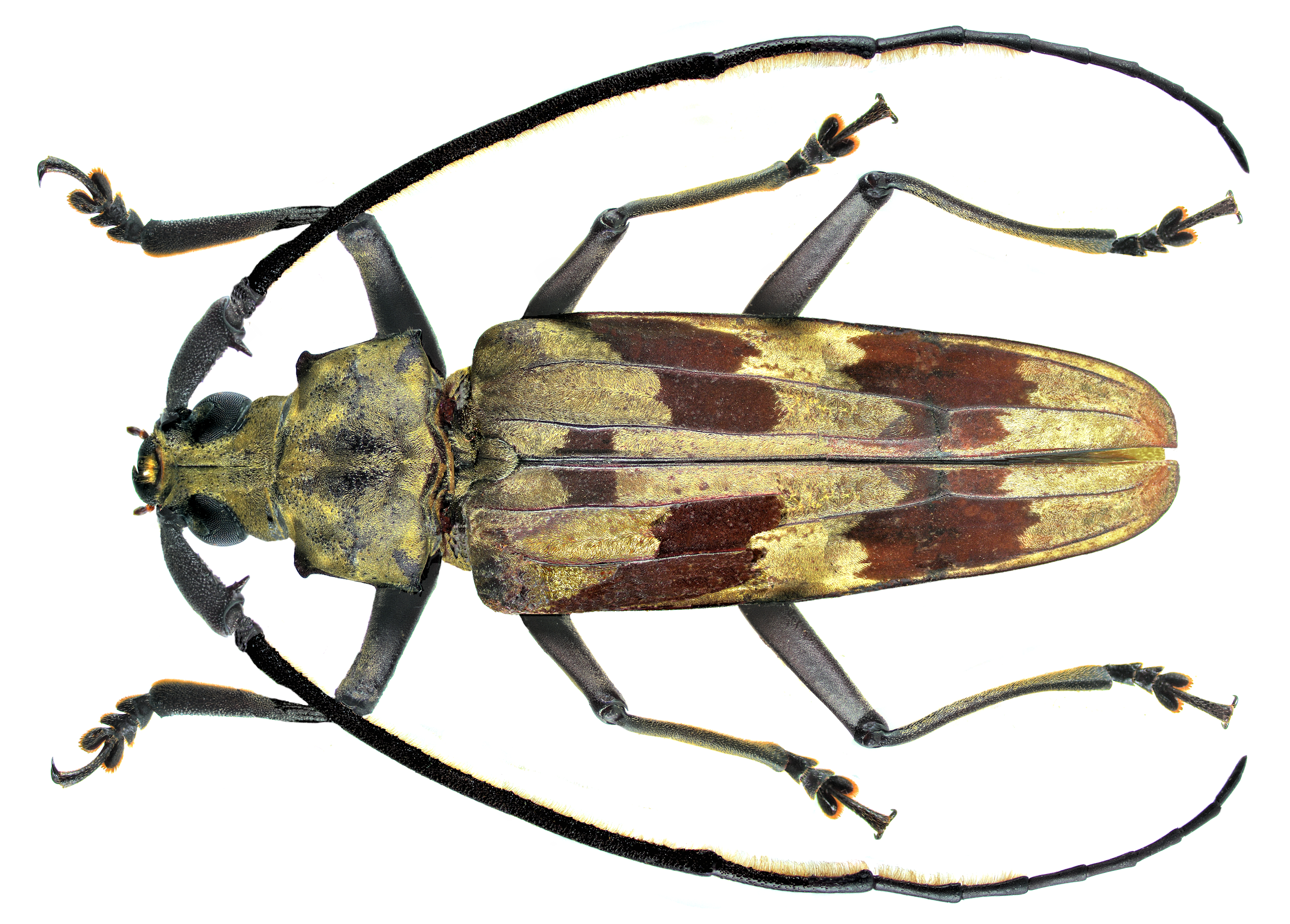

Scientific classification
- Domain: Eukaryota
- Kingdom: Animalia
- Phylum: Arthropoda
- Class: Insecta
- Order: Coleoptera
- Suborder: Polyphaga
- Infraorder: Cucujiformia
- Family: Cerambycidae
- Genus: Baralipton
- Species: B. maculosum

Binomial name
- Baralipton maculosum J. Thomson, 1857

= Baralipton maculosum =

Species of beetle

Baralipton maculosum is a species of long-horn beetle found in the Indomalayan Realm. They have been recorded from northeast India and Southeast Asia (China, Laos, Myanmar, Thailand and Vietnam). A large beetle, it grows to more than 5 cm long.

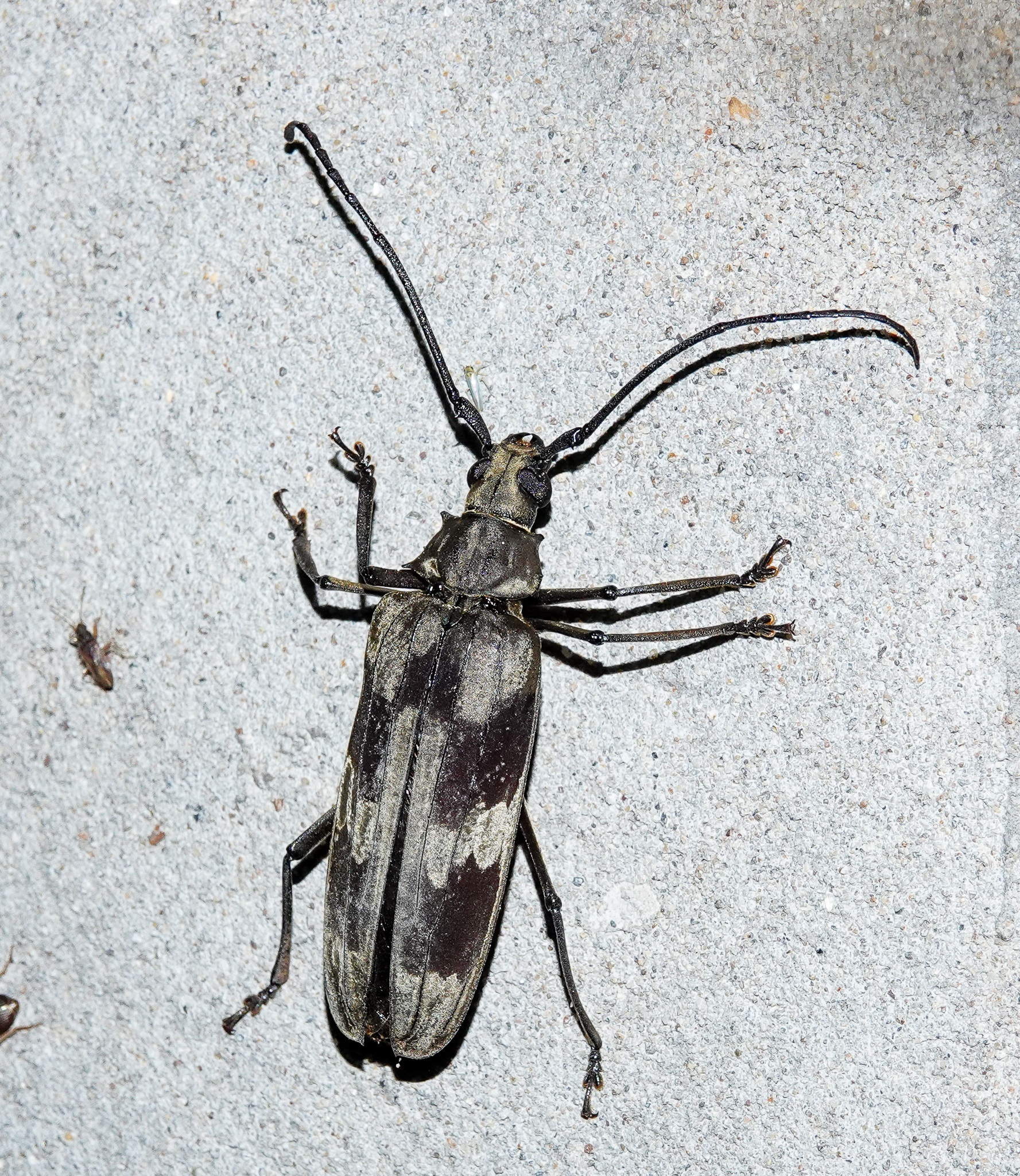
Photo in life from India

The upperside is brownish and covered in dull ashy-grey pubescence giving it a sheen on the elytra. There are dark spots which appear velvet-like. One spot is behind the scutellum and two large irregular spots extend from the outer elytral margin to the inner costa which are staggered. The elytra are rounded at the tip but armed at the suture with a short spine. Two raised ridges runs along each of the elytra, the inner extending from the base to two thirds of the length while the outer one stops short of the apex. The long antenna is 11-segmented with the 3rd being the longest. Each segment has the terminal part black.
