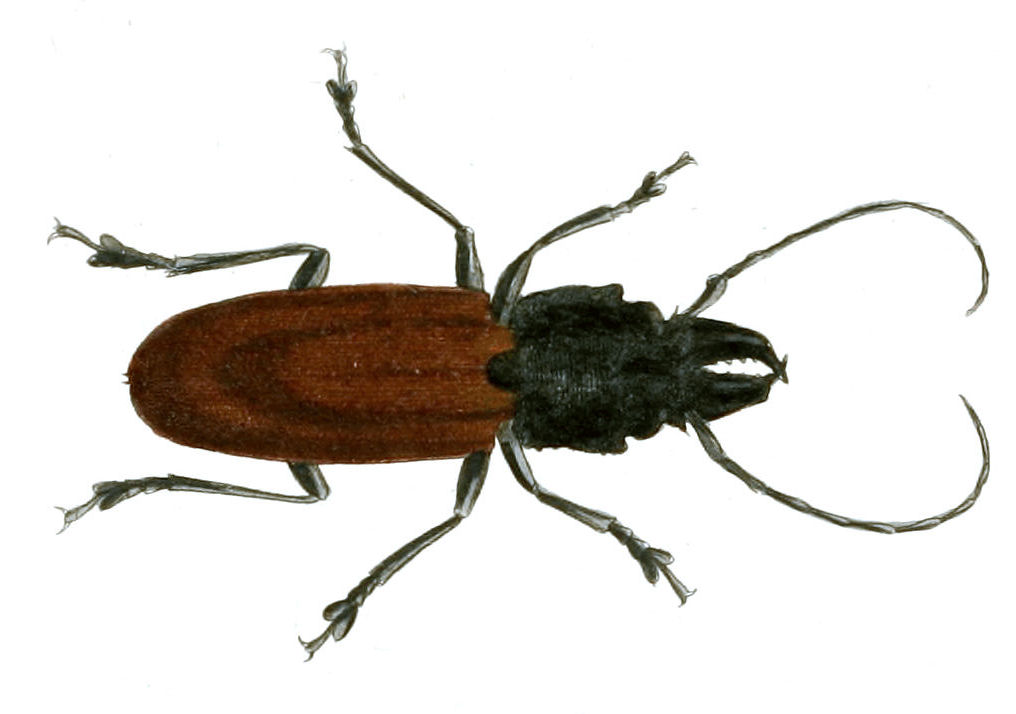
- Hovorodon maxillosum

Scientific classification
- Kingdom: Animalia
- Phylum: Arthropoda
- Clade: Pancrustacea
- Class: Insecta
- Order: Coleoptera
- Suborder: Polyphaga
- Infraorder: Cucujiformia
- Family: Cerambycidae
- Subfamily: Prioninae
- Tribe: Mallodonini
- Genus: Hovorodon; Santos-Silva, Swift & Nearns, 2010

= Hovorodon =

Genus of beetles

Hovorodon is a genus of beetles in the family Cerambycidae. It was established in 2010 by division of the genus Nothopleurus and contains the following species:

- Hovorodon bituberculatum (Palisot de Beauvois, 1805)
- Hovorodon maxillosum (Drury, 1773)
- Hovorodon santacruzensis (Hovore & Santos-Silva, 2004)
- Hovorodon subcancellatum (Thomson, 1867)
