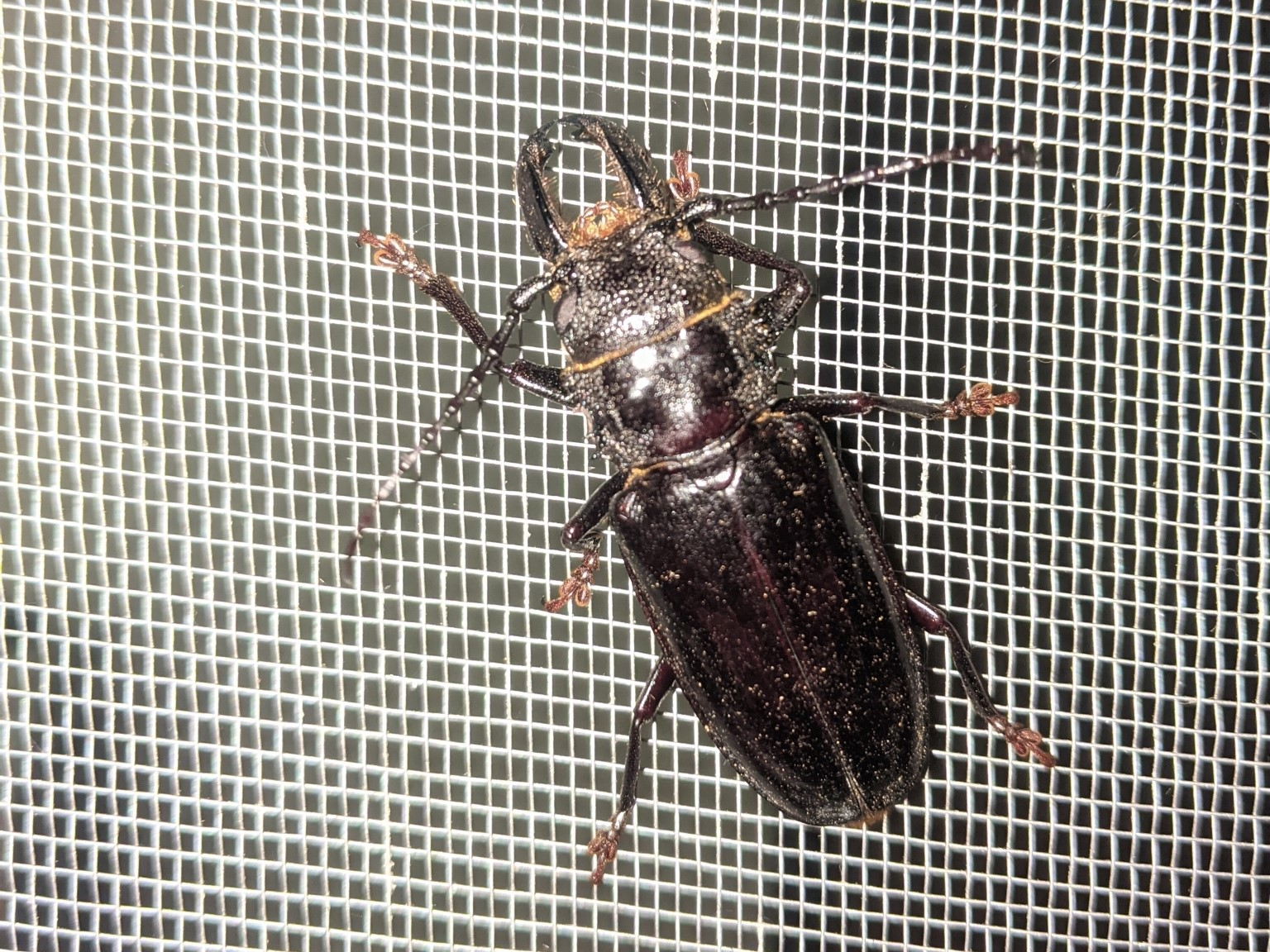

Scientific classification
- Kingdom: Animalia
- Phylum: Arthropoda
- Clade: Pancrustacea
- Class: Insecta
- Order: Coleoptera
- Suborder: Polyphaga
- Infraorder: Cucujiformia
- Family: Cerambycidae
- Genus: Nothopleurus
- Species: N. lobigenis

Binomial name
- Nothopleurus lobigenis Bates, 1884

Synonyms
- Nothopleurus castaneum (Casey, 1924)

= Nothopleurus lobigenis =

Species of beetle

Nothopleurus lobigenis, the southwestern stump borer, is a species of long-horned beetle in the family Cerambycidae. It is found in Central America and North America.
