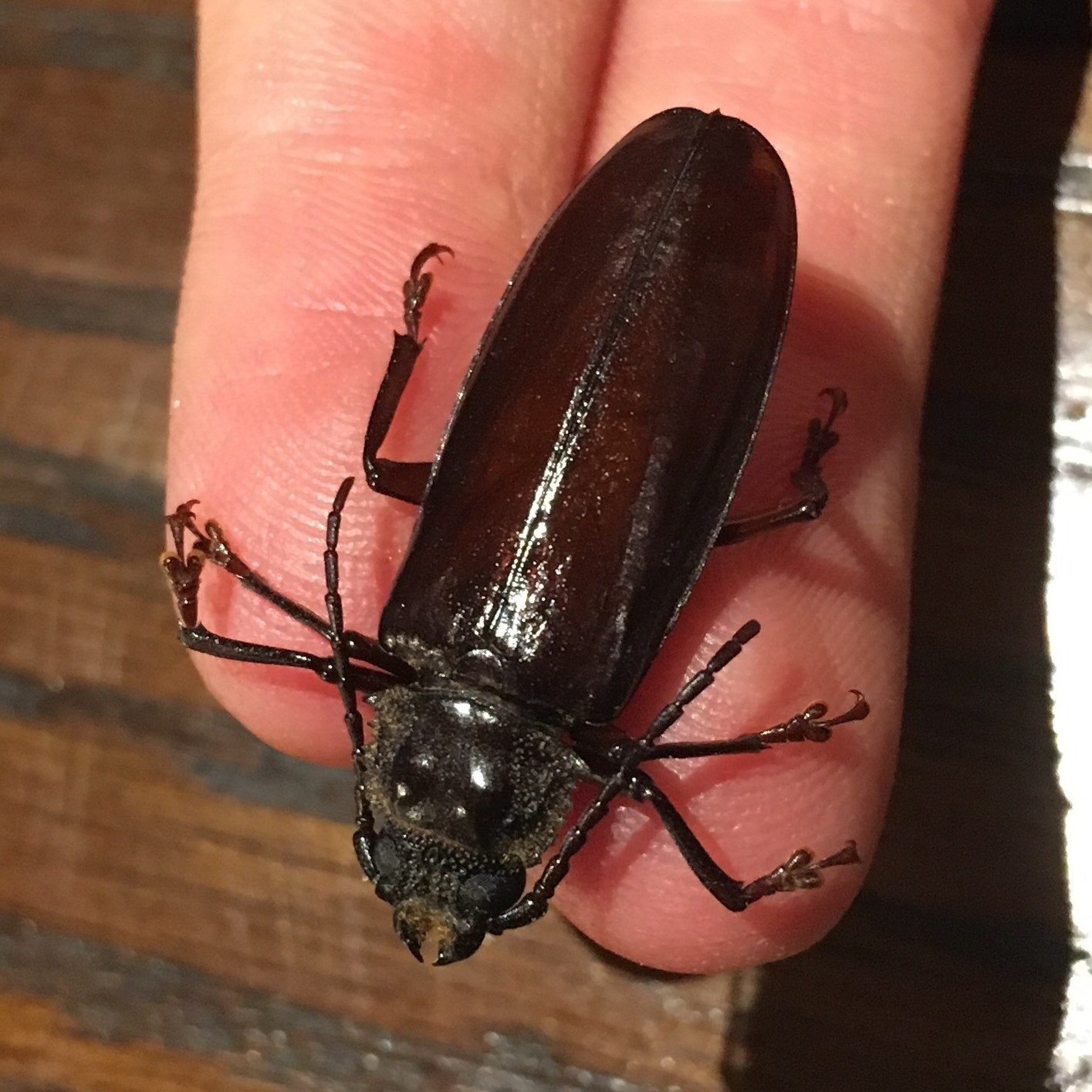

Scientific classification
- Kingdom: Animalia
- Phylum: Arthropoda
- Clade: Pancrustacea
- Class: Insecta
- Order: Coleoptera
- Suborder: Polyphaga
- Infraorder: Cucujiformia
- Family: Cerambycidae
- Genus: Nothopleurus
- Species: N. madericus

Binomial name
- Nothopleurus madericus (Skiles, 1978)

= Nothopleurus madericus =

Species of beetle

Nothopleurus madericus is a species of long-horned beetle in the family Cerambycidae. It is found in Central America and North America.
