= Nothopleurus =

Scientific classification
- Kingdom: Animalia
- Phylum: Arthropoda
- Clade: Pancrustacea
- Class: Insecta
- Order: Coleoptera
- Suborder: Polyphaga
- Infraorder: Cucujiformia
- Family: Cerambycidae
- Subfamily: Prioninae
- Tribe: Macrotomini
- Genus: Nothopleurus; Lacordaire, 1869

Genus of beetles

Nothopleurus is a genus of beetles in the family Cerambycidae, containing the following species:

- Nothopleurus arabicus (Buquet, 1843)
- Nothopleurus castaneum (Casey, 1924)
- Nothopleurus lobigenis Bates, 1884
- Nothopleurus madericus (Skiles, 1978)
- Nothopleurus subsulcatus (Dalman, 1823)
