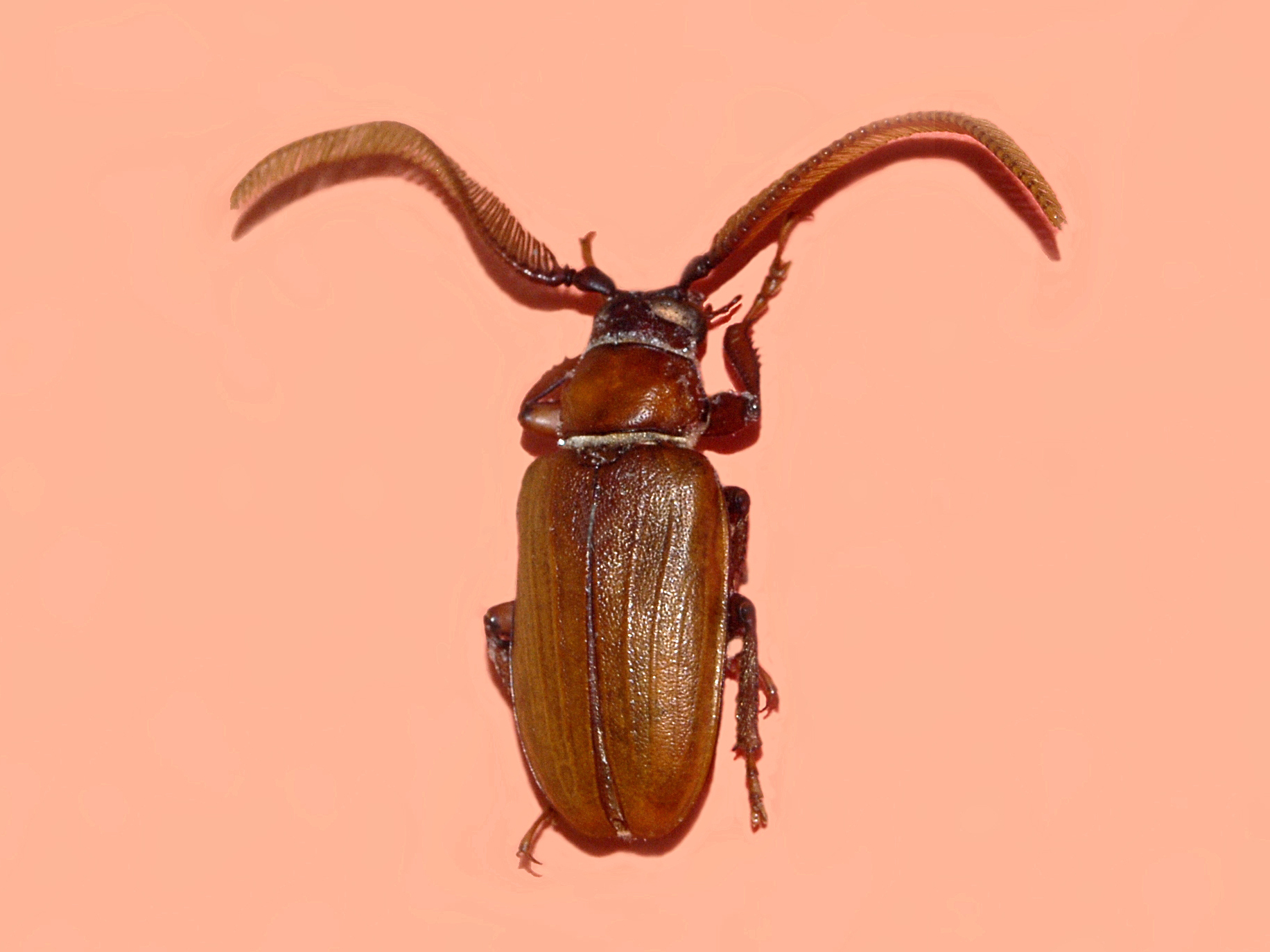
- Museum specimen of Cantharocnemis antennatus

Scientific classification
- Domain: Eukaryota
- Kingdom: Animalia
- Phylum: Arthropoda
- Class: Insecta
- Order: Coleoptera
- Suborder: Polyphaga
- Infraorder: Cucujiformia
- Family: Cerambycidae
- Subfamily: Prioninae
- Tribe: Cantharocnemini
- Genus: Cantharocnemis; Audinet-Serville, 1832

Synonyms
- Acmene Gistel, 1848; Cantharofoedus Gilmour, 1956; Hoploscelis Audinet-Serville, 1832

= Cantharocnemis =

Genus of beetles

Cantharocnemis is a genus of longhorn beetles of the subfamily Prioninae. The species in the genus are mainly found in Africa with a few species in Asia.

== Species ==
- Cantharocnemis antennatus Franz, 1938
- Cantharocnemis burchelli Westwood, 1866
- Cantharocnemis downesi Pascoe, 1858
- Cantharocnemis durantoni Drumont, 2006
- Cantharocnemis fairmairei Lameere, 1902
- Cantharocnemis felderi Westwood, 1866
- Cantharocnemis filippovi Plavilstshikov, 1933
- Cantharocnemis kraatzi Thomson, 1860
- Cantharocnemis lameerei Gilmour, 1956
- Cantharocnemis livingstonei Westwood, 1866
- Cantharocnemis minor Kolbe, 1898
- Cantharocnemis occidentalis Gilmour, 1956
- Cantharocnemis plicipennis Fairmaire, 1887
- Cantharocnemis somalius Gahan, 1894
- Cantharocnemis spondyloides Audinet-Serville, 1832
- Cantharocnemis strandi Plavilstshikov, 1933
