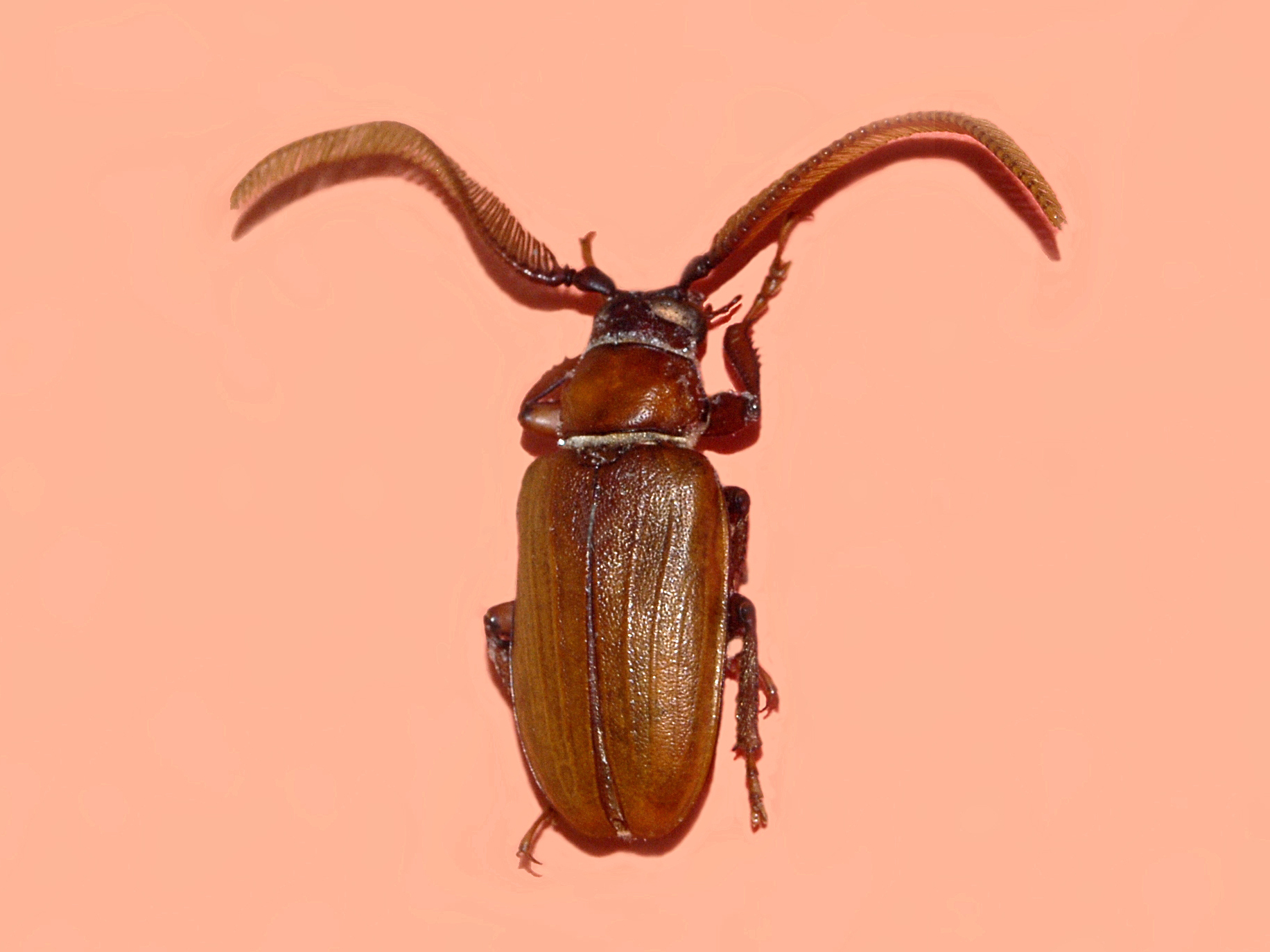
- Museum specimen of Cantharocnemis antennatus

Scientific classification
- Domain: Eukaryota
- Kingdom: Animalia
- Phylum: Arthropoda
- Class: Insecta
- Order: Coleoptera
- Suborder: Polyphaga
- Infraorder: Cucujiformia
- Family: Cerambycidae
- Genus: Cantharocnemis
- Species: C. antennatus

Binomial name
- Cantharocnemis antennatus Franz, 1938

Synonyms
- Cantharocnemis filippovi antennatus (Franz) Quentin & Simonetta, 1993; Cantharocnemis mainardii Capra 1939

= Cantharocnemis antennatus =

Species of beetle

Cantharocnemis antennatus is a species of longhorn beetles of the subfamily Prioninae.

== Description ==
Cantharocnemis antennatus can reach a body length of about 37 millimetres (1.5 in),

== Distribution ==
This species can be found in Kenya and Somalia.
