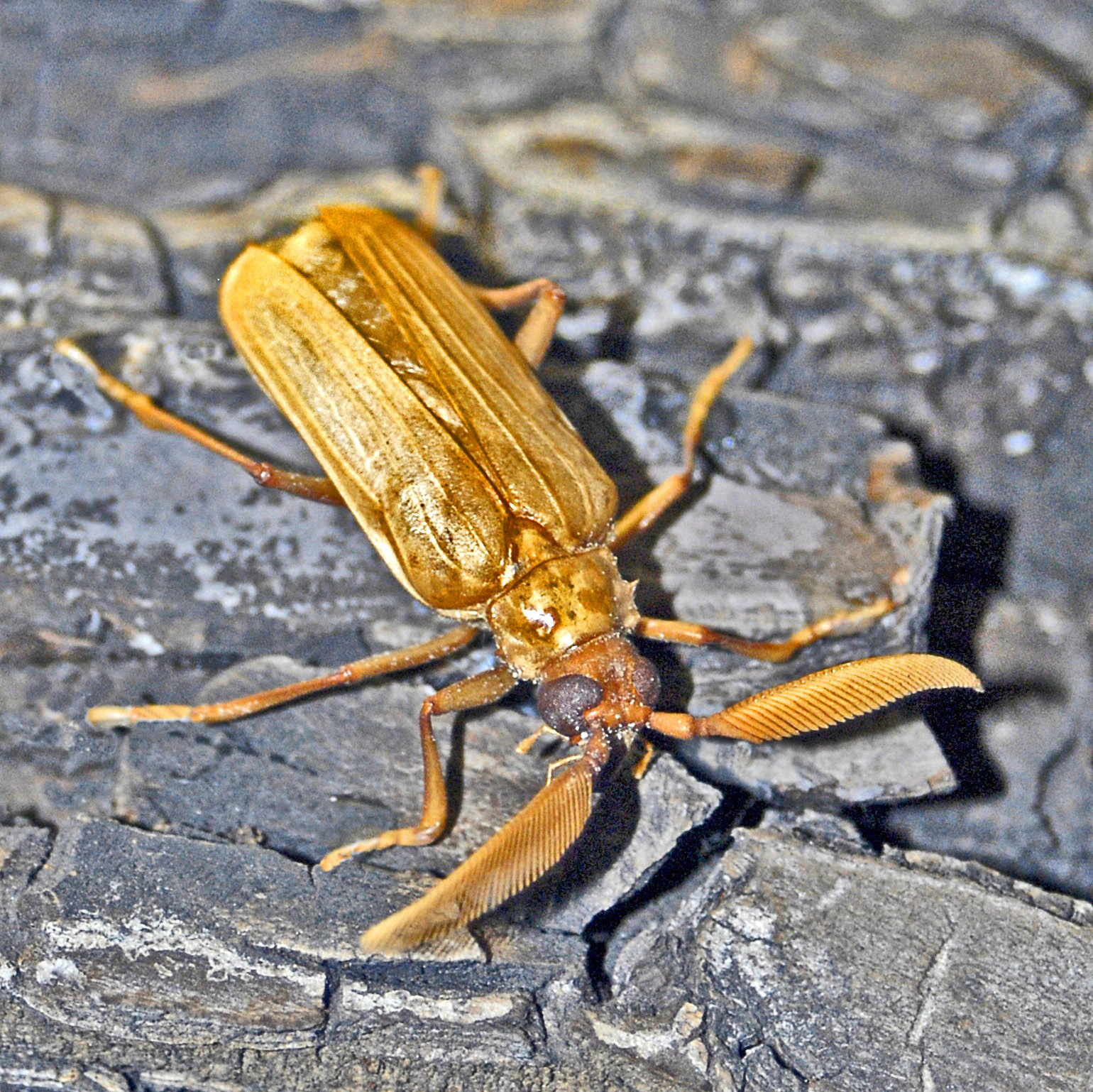
- Polyarthron pectinicorne

Scientific classification
- Kingdom: Animalia
- Phylum: Arthropoda
- Clade: Pancrustacea
- Class: Insecta
- Order: Coleoptera
- Suborder: Polyphaga
- Infraorder: Cucujiformia
- Family: Cerambycidae
- Subfamily: Prioninae
- Tribe: Prionini
- Genus: Polyarthron; Audinet-Serville, 1832

= Polyarthron =

Genus of beetles

Polyarthron is a genus of beetle in the family Cerambycidae.

== Species ==
- Polyarthron pectinicorne (Fabricius, 1792)
- Polyarthron philbyi Villiers, 1968
