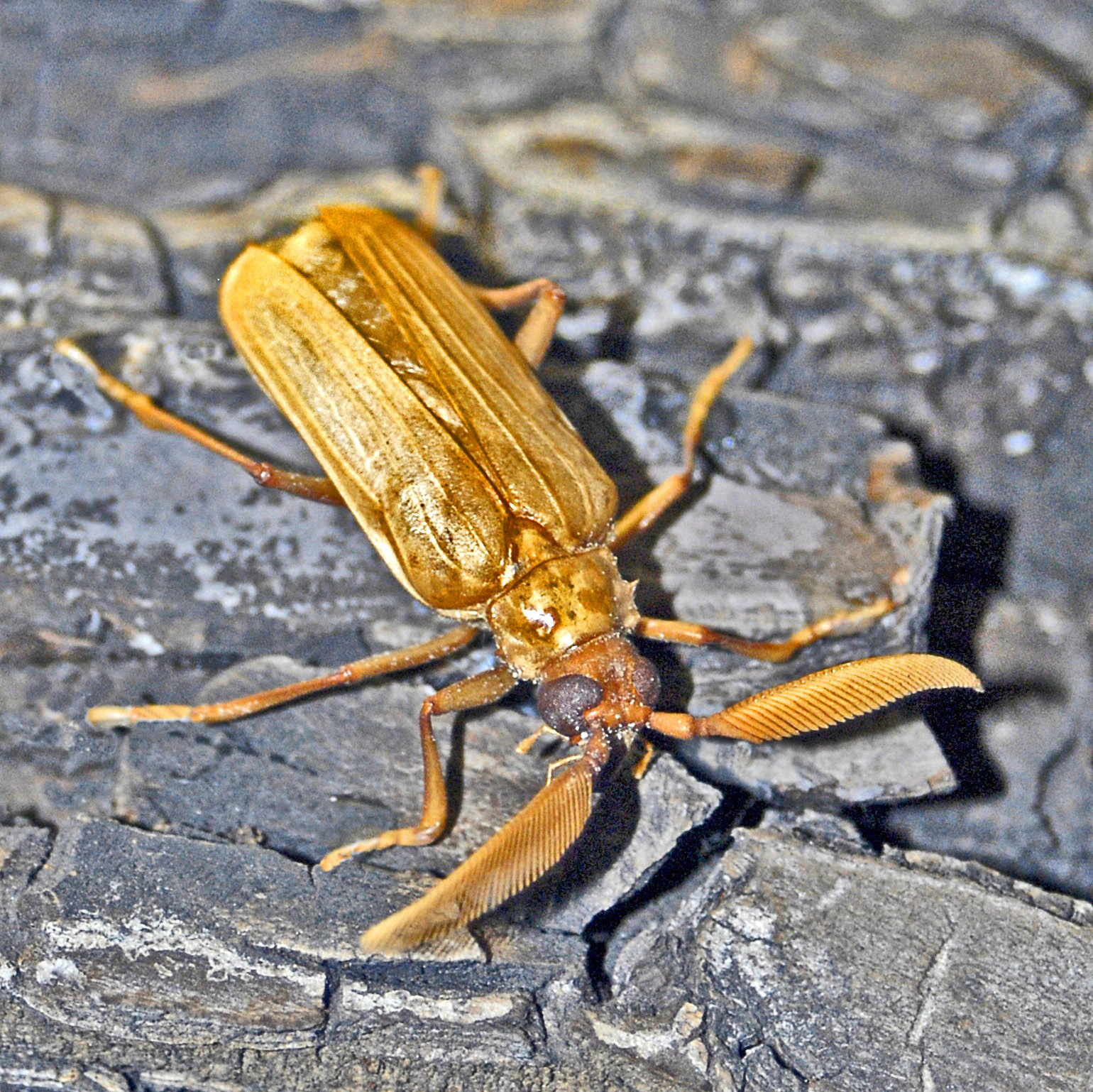

Scientific classification
- Kingdom: Animalia
- Phylum: Arthropoda
- Clade: Pancrustacea
- Class: Insecta
- Order: Coleoptera
- Suborder: Polyphaga
- Infraorder: Cucujiformia
- Family: Cerambycidae
- Genus: Polyarthron
- Species: P. pectinicorne

Binomial name
- Polyarthron pectinicorne Fabricius, 1793

Synonyms
- List: Polyarthron barbarum (Fairmaire & Coquerel, 1866); Polyarthron fairmairei (Pic, 1893); Prionus pectinicornis fairmairei (Lameere, 1912); Prionus Polyarthron pectinicornis subsp. fairmairei (Lameere, 1913); Polyarthron pectinicornis chatanayi (Lameere, 1915); Prionus Polyarthron chatanayi (Quentin, 1956); Polyarthron pectinicornis subsp. chatanayi (Breuning & Villiers, 1960)

= Polyarthron pectinicorne =

Species of beetle

Polyarthron pectinicorne is a species of beetle in the family Cerambycidae.

== Subspecies ==
The following subspecies are recognised:

- Polyarthron pectinicorne desvauxi Fairmaire, 1868
- Polyarthron pectinicorne fairmairei Pic, 1893
- Polyarthron pectinicorne jolyi Pic, 1895
- Polyarthron pectinicorne pectinicorne (Fabricius, 1792)

== Description ==
Polyarthron pectinicorne can reach a length of 20–36 millimetres (0.79–1.42 in) in males, of 25–44 millimetres (0.98–1.73 in) in females. Thorax and elytra may be pale or dark brown. Elytra show three costae. Mandibles are quite long. Antennae are longer in males than in females. They are composed by 47 articles.

These beetles feed on Phoenix dactylifera. Larvae feed on roots. Adults can be seen from July to September.

== Distribution ==
This species is present in North Africa (Algeria, Mauritania, Senegal, Libya, Tchad, Niger and Tunisia).
