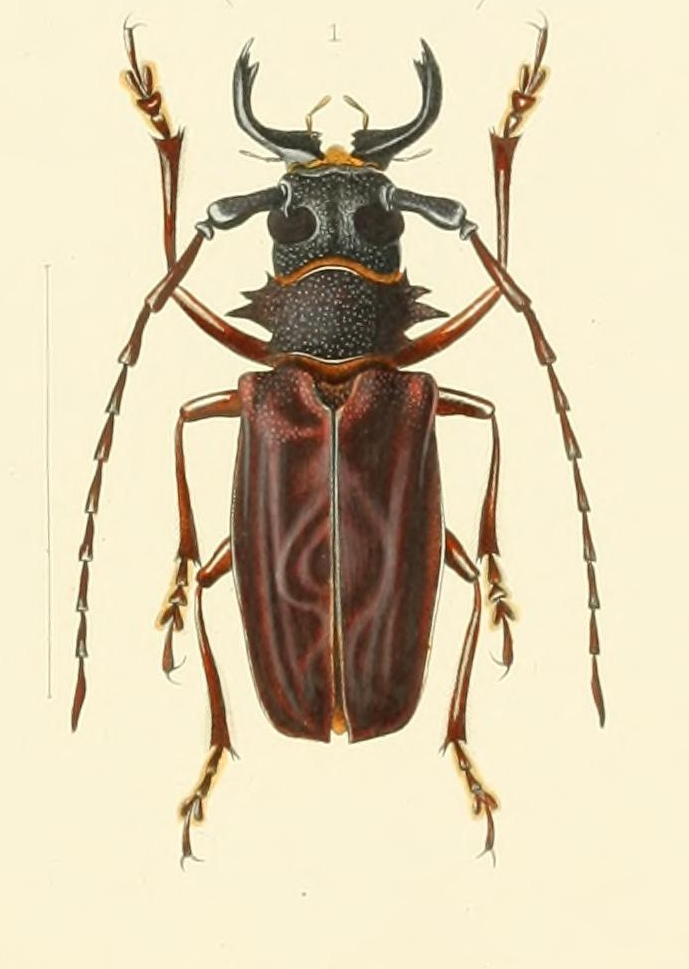
- P. mordax male

Scientific classification
- Domain: Eukaryota
- Kingdom: Animalia
- Phylum: Arthropoda
- Class: Insecta
- Order: Coleoptera
- Suborder: Polyphaga
- Infraorder: Cucujiformia
- Family: Cerambycidae
- Subfamily: Prioninae
- Genus: Priotyrannus; Thomson, 1857

Type species
- Prionus mordax White, 1853

= Priotyrannus =

Genus of beetles

Priotyrannus is a genus of long-horned beetles in the subfamily Prioninae found in the Old World tropics within the Indo-Malayan Realm. Species in the genus include:

- Priotyrannus mordax
- Priotyrannus closteroides
  - Priotyrannus closteroides lutauensis
- Priotyrannus hueti
- Priotyrannus megalops
