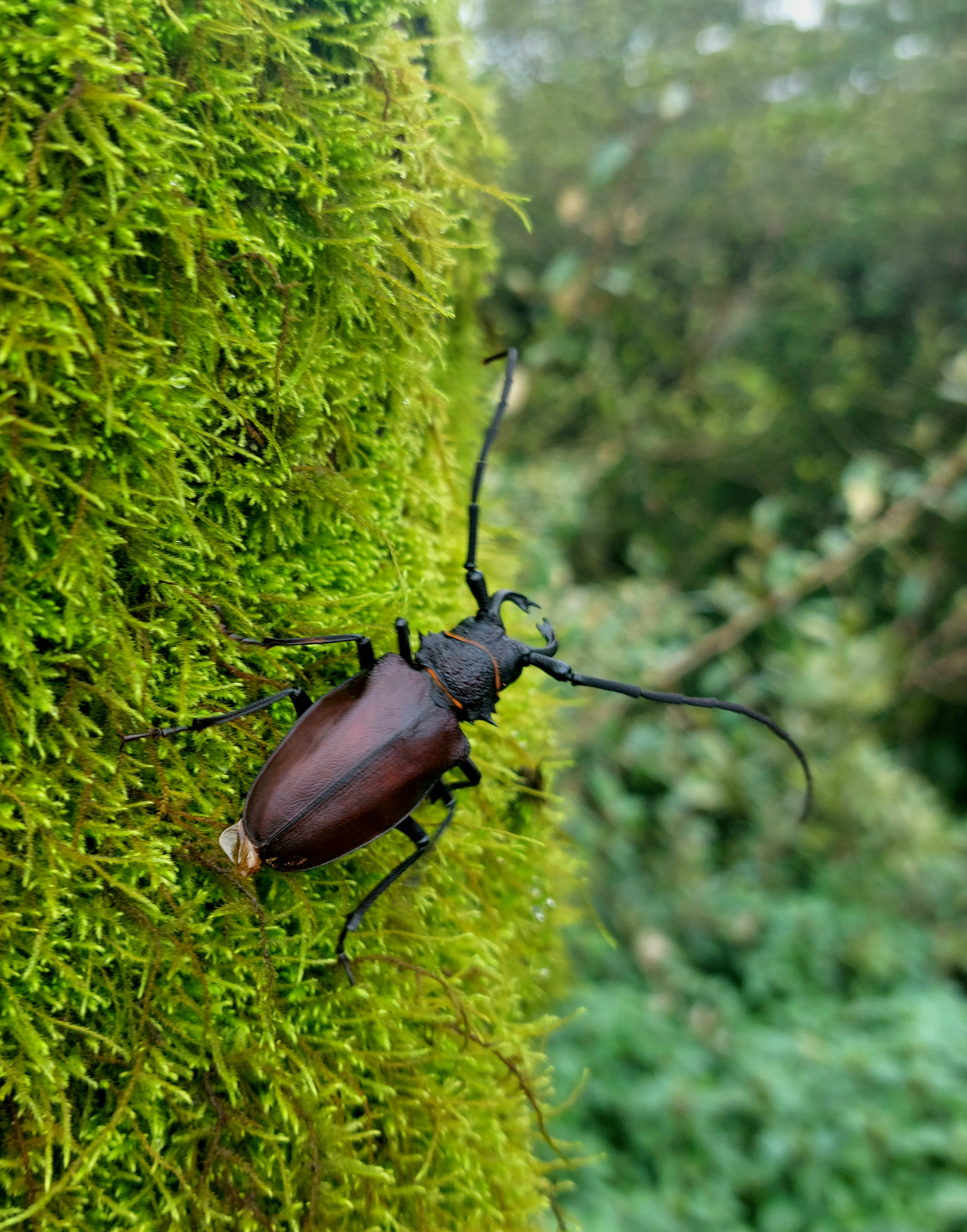
- Male of the typical form from Kemmangundi, Karnataka

Scientific classification
- Domain: Eukaryota
- Kingdom: Animalia
- Phylum: Arthropoda
- Class: Insecta
- Order: Coleoptera
- Suborder: Polyphaga
- Infraorder: Cucujiformia
- Family: Cerambycidae
- Genus: Priotyrannus; Thomson, 1857
- Species: P. mordax

Binomial name
- Priotyrannus mordax (White 1853)

= Priotyrannus mordax =

Species of beetle

Priotyrannus mordax is a species of long-horned beetle in the subfamily Prioninae endemic to the forests of southern India.

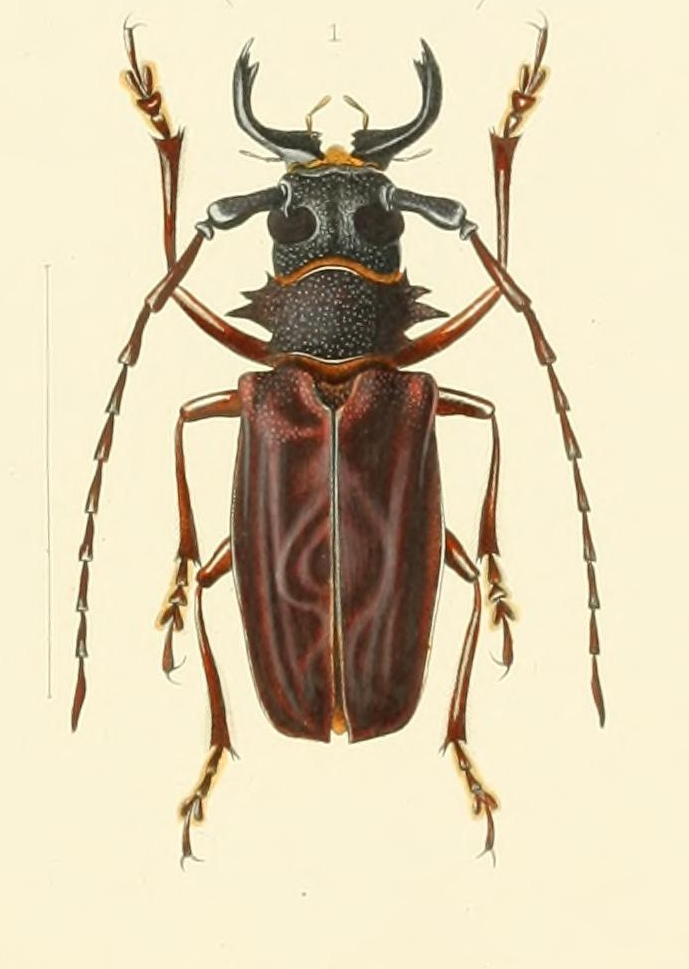

The females have the 11-segmented antennae shorter than the length of the body and the mandibles are not curved. Some individuals have reddish coloured elytra (and termed as variety rufescens) while others have the elytra dark brown. The mandibles of the male are found in two forms, the usual is a long and curved to form a heart shaped space when the tips meet and with one large and a few smaller teeth near the apex. The other form resembles the mandibles of the female with the inner edges of the mandible touching each other with no space in between and toothed all along the inner edge.
