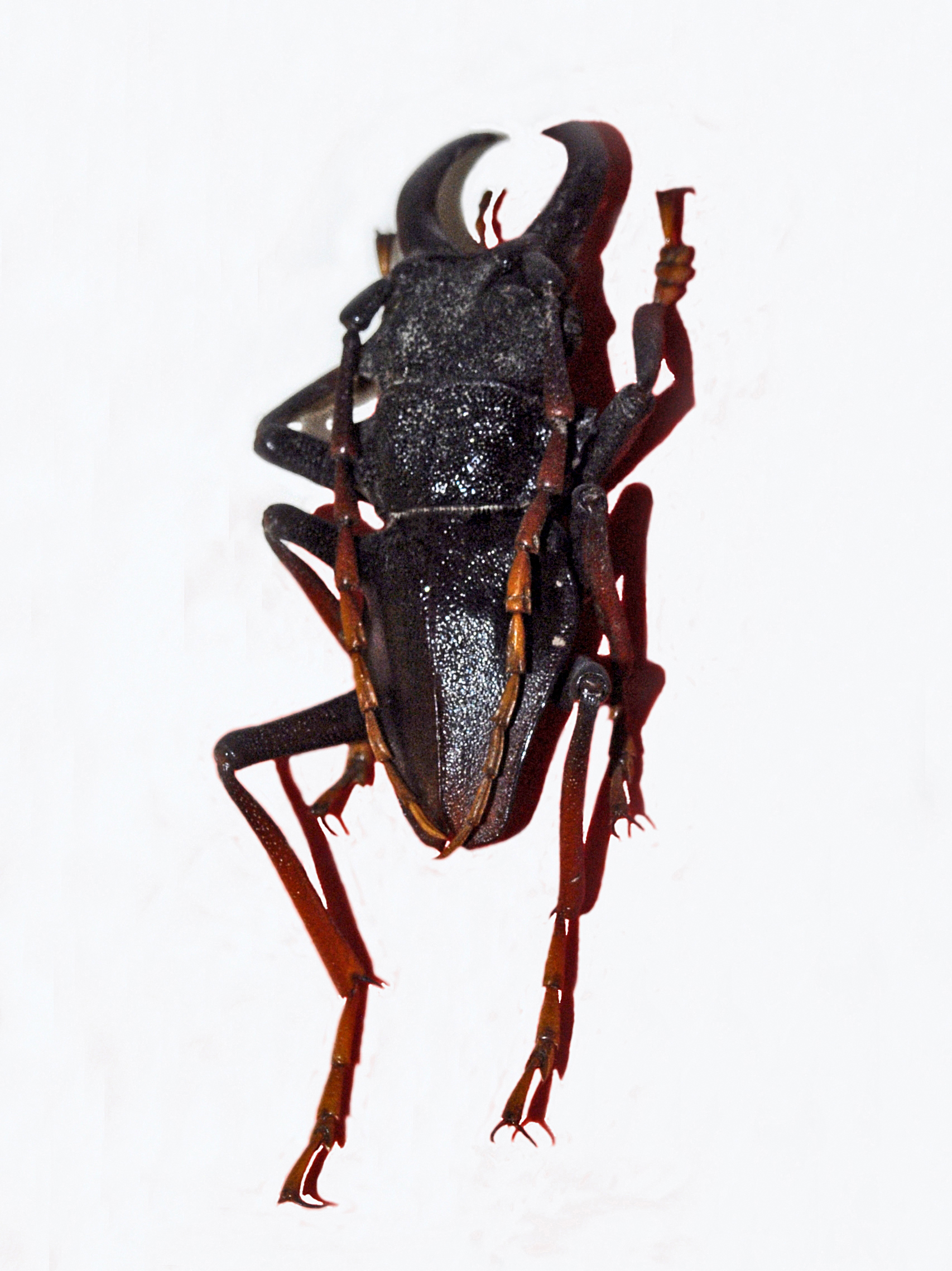
- Museum specimen

Scientific classification
- Kingdom: Animalia
- Phylum: Arthropoda
- Class: Insecta
- Order: Coleoptera
- Suborder: Polyphaga
- Infraorder: Cucujiformia
- Family: Cerambycidae
- Genus: Prionacalus
- Species: P. iphis

Binomial name
- Prionacalus iphis Waterhouse, 1872

Synonyms
- Prionacalus whymperi Bates, 1891; Prionocalus trigonoides Bates in Whymper, 1891; Psalidognathus (Prionocalus) buckleyi (Waterhouse) Lameere, 1910; Psalidognathus buckleyi Waterhouse, 1872; Prionacalus buckleyi Waterhouse, 1872; Prionacalus emmae Kolbe 1901

= Prionacalus iphis =

Species of beetle

Prionacalus iphis is a species of longhorn beetle of the subfamily Prioninae.

== Description ==
Prionacalus iphis can reach a body length of about 44–55 millimetres (1.7–2.2 in). This species has mostly black body, large mouthparts and long antennae.

== Distribution ==
This species is found in Ecuador and Peru.
