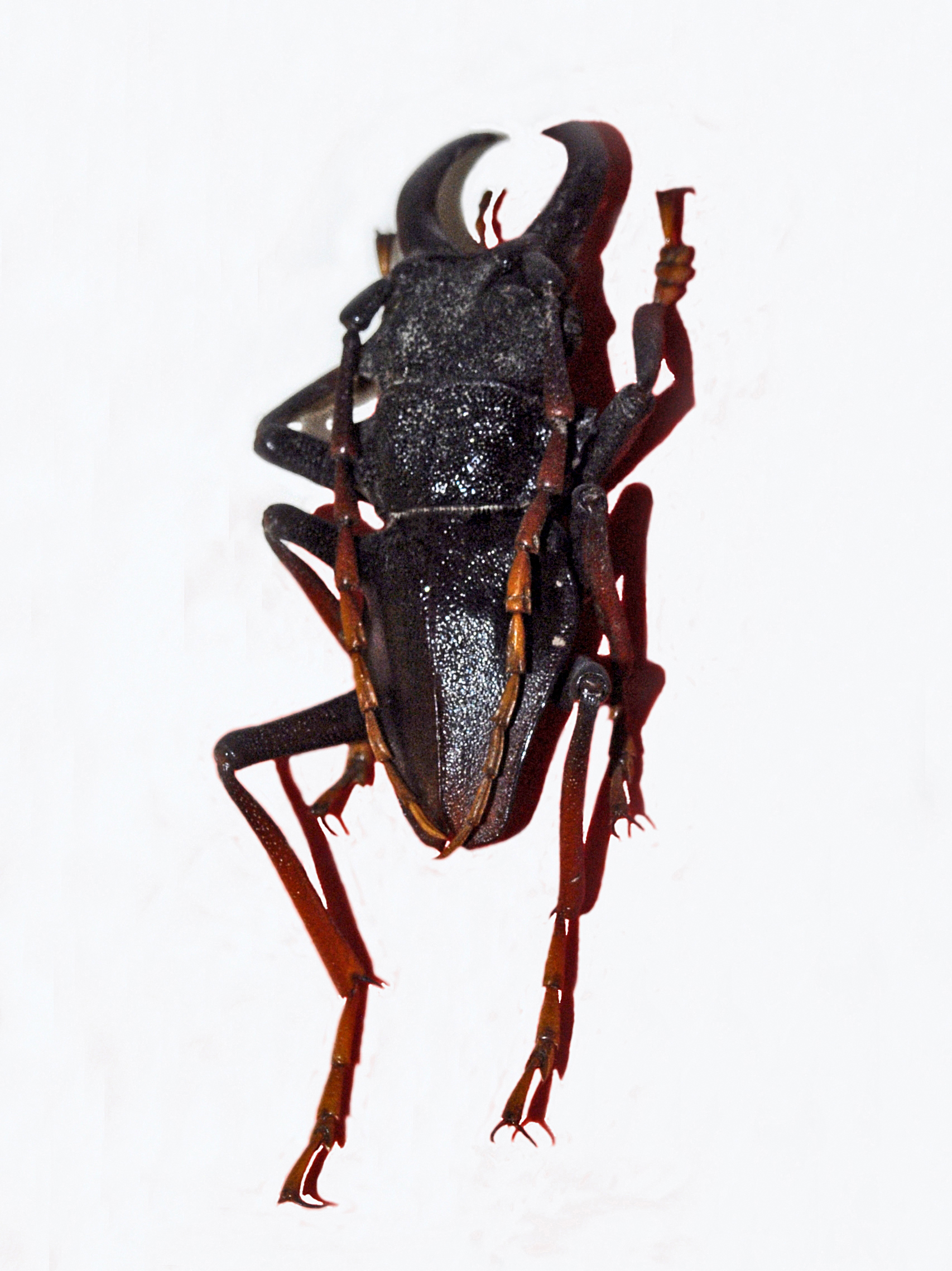
- Museum specimen of Prionacalus iphis

Scientific classification
- Kingdom: Animalia
- Phylum: Arthropoda
- Clade: Pancrustacea
- Class: Insecta
- Order: Coleoptera
- Suborder: Polyphaga
- Infraorder: Cucujiformia
- Family: Cerambycidae
- Subfamily: Prioninae
- Tribe: Prionini
- Genus: Prionacalus; White, 1845

Synonyms
- Prionocalus Thomson, 1864

= Prionacalus =

Genus of beetles

Prionacalus is a genus of beetles in the family Cerambycidae, containing the following species:

== Species ==
- Prionacalus atys White, 1850
- Prionacalus cacicus White, 1845
- Prionacalus demelti Quentin & Villiers, 1983
- Prionacalus inermus Komiya & Santos-Silva, 2018
- Prionacalus iphis White, 1850
- Prionacalus uniformis Waterhouse, 1900
- Prionacalus whymperi Bates in Whymper, 1892
- Prionacalus woytkowskii (Heyrovsky, 1960)

== Distribution ==
This genus is restricted to western South America from Colombia to northern Argentina.
