= Solenoptera vittatus =

Scientific classification
- Kingdom: Animalia
- Phylum: Arthropoda
- Clade: Pancrustacea
- Class: Insecta
- Order: Coleoptera
- Suborder: Polyphaga
- Infraorder: Cucujiformia
- Family: Cerambycidae
- Genus: Solenoptera
- Species: S. vittatus

Binomial name
- Solenoptera vittatus (Olivier, 1795)

Synonyms
- Derancistrodes vittatus (Olivier, 1795); Prosternodes oberthuri Gahan 1895

Genus of beetles

Solenoptera vittatus is a species of beetle in the family Cerambycidae.
