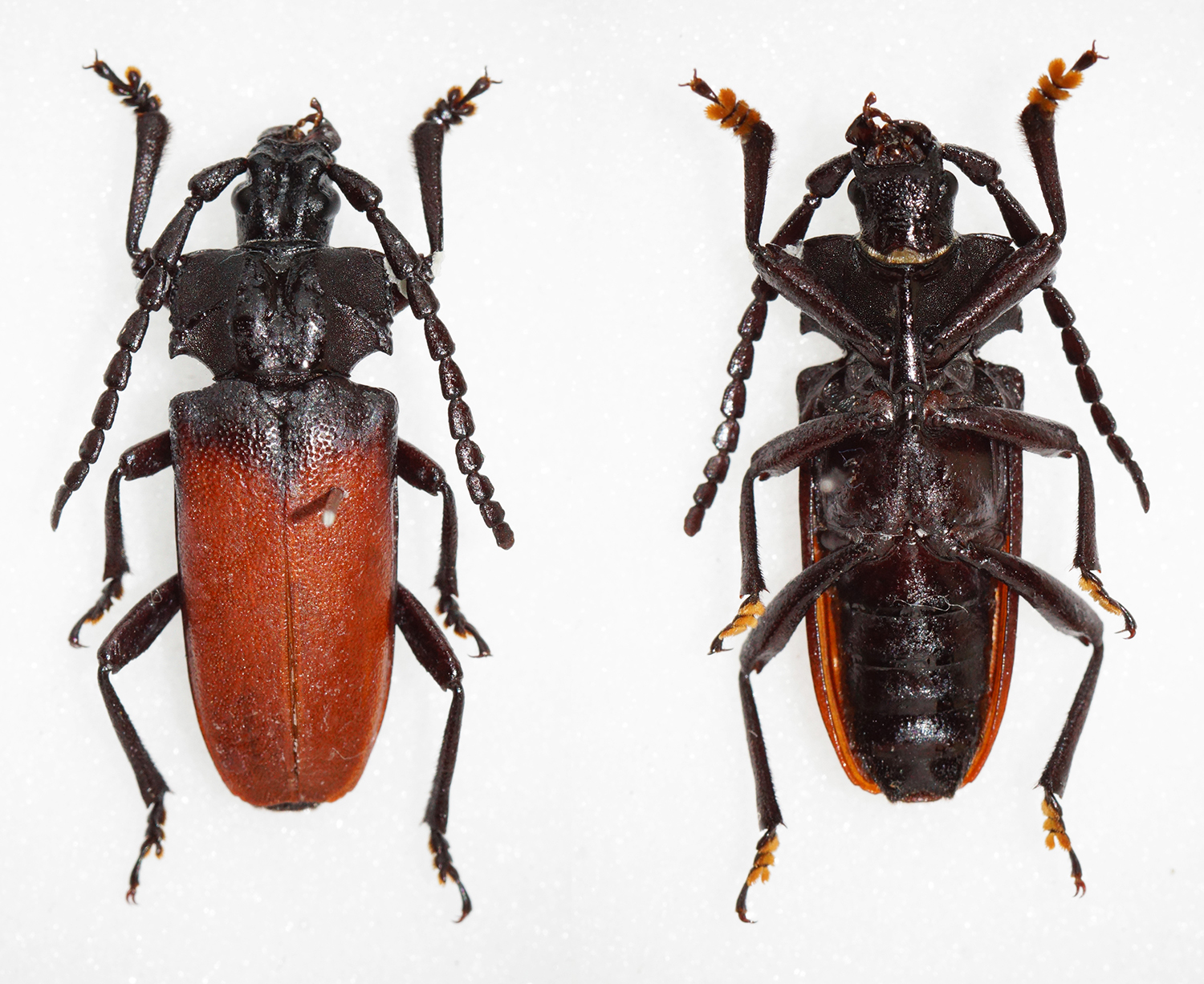
- Solenoptera dominicensis

Scientific classification
- Domain: Eukaryota
- Kingdom: Animalia
- Phylum: Arthropoda
- Class: Insecta
- Order: Coleoptera
- Suborder: Polyphaga
- Infraorder: Cucujiformia
- Family: Cerambycidae
- Subfamily: Prioninae
- Tribe: Solenopterini
- Genus: Solenoptera; Audinet-Serville, 1832

Type species
- Prionus canaliculatus Fabricius, 1787

Synonyms
- Derancistrodes Galileo & Martins, 1993

= Solenoptera =

Genus of beetles

Solenoptera is a genus of beetles in the family Cerambycidae. As of 2018, it contains the following species:

- Solenoptera adusta Galileo & Martins, 1993
- Solenoptera bilineata (Fabricius, 1775)
- Solenoptera canaliculata (Fabricius, 1787)
- Solenoptera chalumeaui Villiers, 1979
- Solenoptera cubana (Zayas, 1975)
- Solenoptera dominicensis (Gahan, 1890)
- Solenoptera furfurosa (Galileo & Martins, 1993)
- Solenoptera helbi Lingafelter, 2015
- Solenoptera intermedia Gahan, 1890
- Solenoptera luciae (Lameere, 1912)
- Solenoptera metallescens Thomson, 1861
- Solenoptera michelii (Chemsak, 1979)
- Solenoptera parandroides Lameere, 1885
- Solenoptera quadrilineata (Olivier, 1795)
- Solenoptera rugosa Lingafelter, 2015
- Solenoptera scutellata (Gahan, 1890)
- Solenoptera sulcicollis Thomson, 1861
- Solenoptera thomae (Linnaeus, 1767)
- Solenoptera tomentosa Lingafelter, 2015
- Solenoptera touroulti Dalens & Delahaye, 2007
- Solenoptera vittata (Olivier, 1795)
- Solenoptera zayasi Devesa et al., 2016
