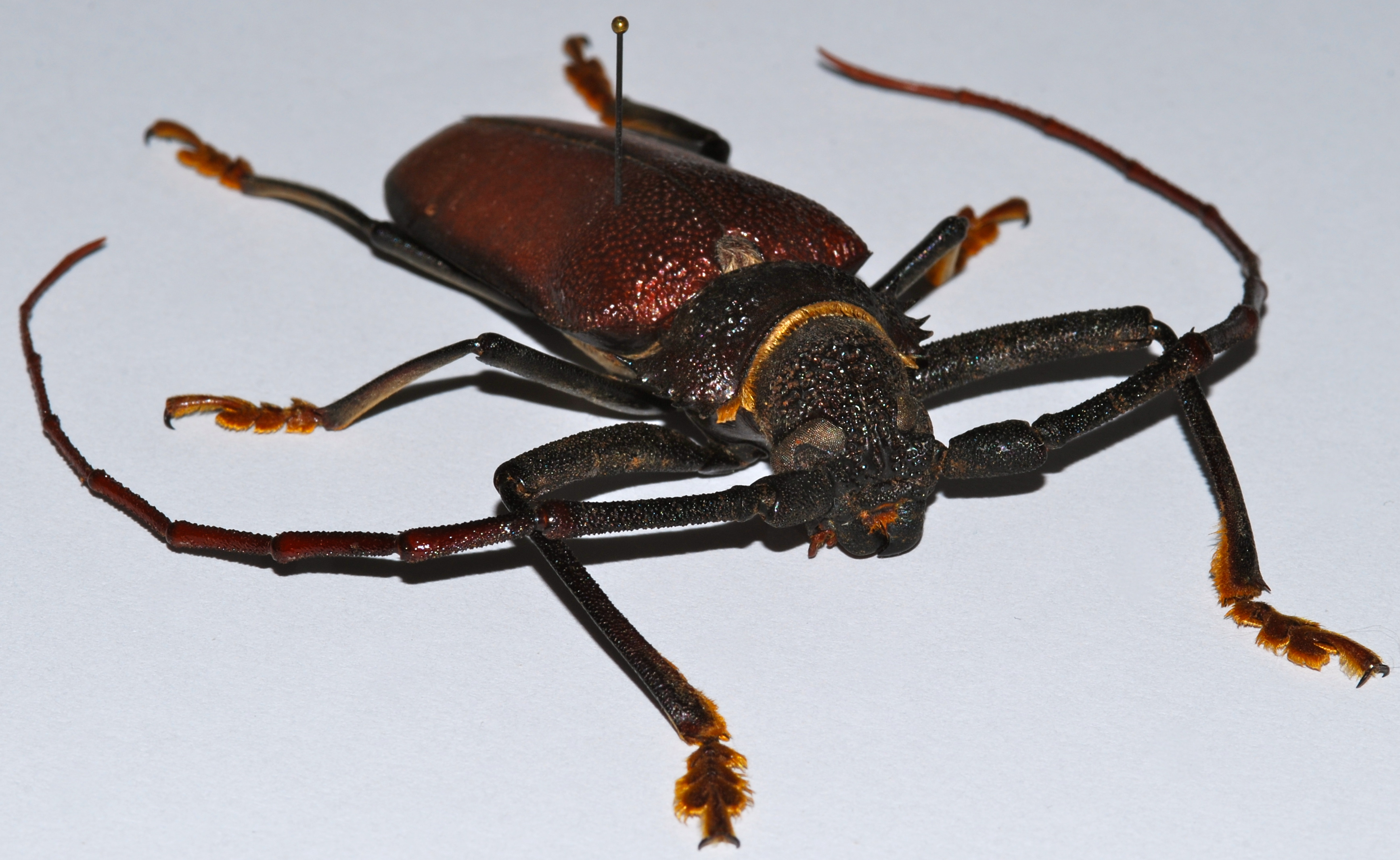

Scientific classification
- Kingdom: Animalia
- Phylum: Arthropoda
- Clade: Pancrustacea
- Class: Insecta
- Order: Coleoptera
- Suborder: Polyphaga
- Infraorder: Cucujiformia
- Family: Cerambycidae
- Subfamily: Prioninae
- Genus: Hoplideres; Audinet-Serville, 1832

= Hoplideres =

Genus of beetles

Hoplideres is a genus of beetles in the family Cerambycidae.

== Selected species ==
- Hoplideres aquilus Coquerel, 1859
- Hoplideres spinipennis Audinet-Serville, 1832
