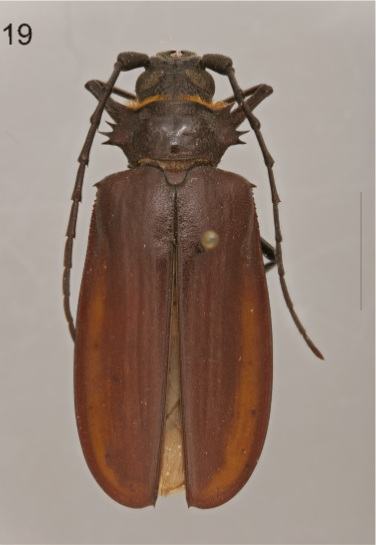
- Hoplideres spinipennis nitidior

Scientific classification
- Kingdom: Animalia
- Phylum: Arthropoda
- Class: Insecta
- Order: Coleoptera
- Suborder: Polyphaga
- Infraorder: Cucujiformia
- Family: Cerambycidae
- Genus: Hoplideres
- Species: H. spinipennis

Binomial name
- Hoplideres spinipennis Audinet-Serville, 1832

Synonyms
- Hoplideres rugicollis Waterhouse, 1878; Hoploderes boppei Lameere, 1920; Hoplideres neclarus Gilmour, 1962

= Hoplideres spinipennis =

Species of beetle

Hoplideres spinipennis is a species of beetle of the Cerambycidae family. It is found in Madagascar.

== Subspecies ==
- Hoplideres spinipennis spinipennis
- Hoplideres spinipennis nitidior (Lameere, 1906)
- Hoplideres spinipennis parallelus (Lameere, 1920)
