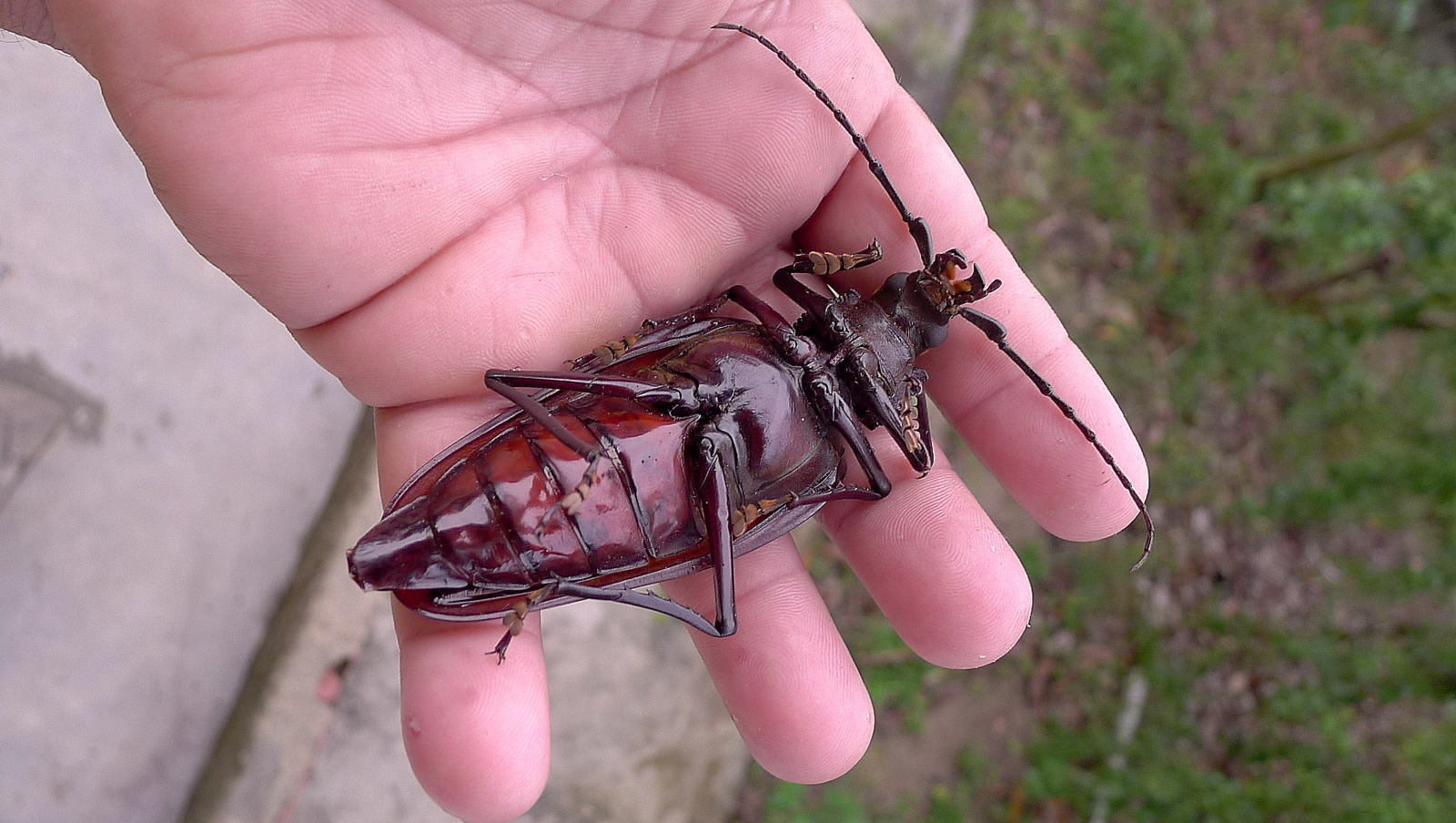
- Ctenoscelis coeus

Scientific classification
- Kingdom: Animalia
- Phylum: Arthropoda
- Clade: Pancrustacea
- Class: Insecta
- Order: Coleoptera
- Suborder: Polyphaga
- Infraorder: Cucujiformia
- Family: Cerambycidae
- Subfamily: Prioninae
- Tribe: Callipogonini
- Genus: Ctenoscelis; Audinet-Serville, 1832

= Ctenoscelis =

Genus of beetles

Ctenoscelis is a genus of beetles in the family Cerambycidae, containing the following species:

- Ctenoscelis acanthopus (Germar, 1824)
- Ctenoscelis ater (Olivier, 1795)
- Ctenoscelis coeus (Perty, 1832)
- Ctenoscelis simplicicollis (Bates, 1875)
