= Ctenoscelis simplicicollis =

Scientific classification
- Kingdom: Animalia
- Phylum: Arthropoda
- Clade: Pancrustacea
- Class: Insecta
- Order: Coleoptera
- Suborder: Polyphaga
- Infraorder: Cucujiformia
- Family: Cerambycidae
- Genus: Ctenoscelis
- Species: C. simplicicollis

Binomial name
- Ctenoscelis simplicicollis (Bates, 1875)

Synonyms
- Apotrophus simplicicollis Bates, 1875; Paranaecus olivieri Thomson 1877

Genus of beetles

Ctenoscelis simplicicollis is a species of beetle in the family Cerambycidae.
