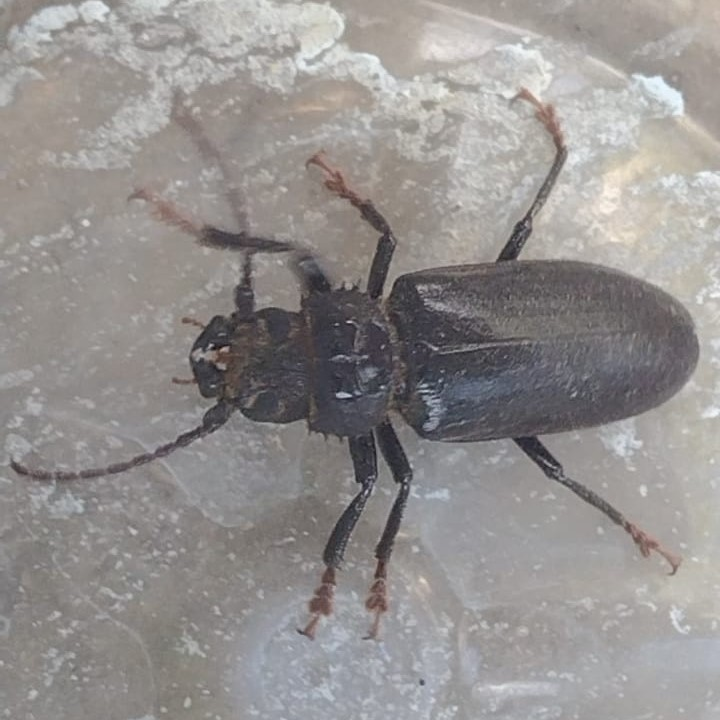

Scientific classification
- Domain: Eukaryota
- Kingdom: Animalia
- Phylum: Arthropoda
- Class: Insecta
- Order: Coleoptera
- Suborder: Polyphaga
- Infraorder: Cucujiformia
- Family: Cerambycidae
- Genus: Aplagiognathus
- Species: A. spinosus

Binomial name
- Aplagiognathus spinosus Newman, 1840

= Aplagiognathus spinosus =

Species of beetle

Aplagiognathus spinosus is a species of longhorn beetle. It is endemic to Honduras and the Mexican states of Puebla, Oaxaca and Veracruz.
