= Aplagiognathus hybostoma =

Scientific classification
- Domain: Eukaryota
- Kingdom: Animalia
- Phylum: Arthropoda
- Class: Insecta
- Order: Coleoptera
- Suborder: Polyphaga
- Infraorder: Cucujiformia
- Family: Cerambycidae
- Genus: Aplagiognathus
- Species: A. hybostoma

Binomial name
- Aplagiognathus hybostoma Bates, 1879

Species of beetle

Aplagiognathus hybostoma is a species of longhorn beetle in the genus Aplagiognathus. It is endemic to Guatemala and Honduras.
