= Aplagiognathus =

Scientific classification
- Kingdom: Animalia
- Phylum: Arthropoda
- Clade: Pancrustacea
- Class: Insecta
- Order: Coleoptera
- Suborder: Polyphaga
- Infraorder: Cucujiformia
- Family: Cerambycidae
- Subfamily: Prioninae
- Tribe: Macrotomini
- Genus: Aplagiognathus; Thomson 1860

Genus of beetles

Aplagiognathus is a genus of beetles in the family Cerambycidae, containing the following species:

- Aplagiognathus hybostoma Bates, 1879
- Aplagiognathus spinosus (Newman, 1840)
