= Plectiscidea =

Scientific classification
- Kingdom: Animalia
- Phylum: Arthropoda
- Class: Insecta
- Order: Hymenoptera
- Family: Ichneumonidae
- Subfamily: Orthocentrinae
- Genus: Plectiscidea; Viereck, 1914

Genus of wasps

Plectiscidea is a genus of parasitoid wasps belonging to the family Ichneumonidae.

The genus has almost cosmopolitan distribution.

Species:

- Plectiscidea abdita (Forster, 1871)
- Plectiscidea agitator (Forster, 1871)
