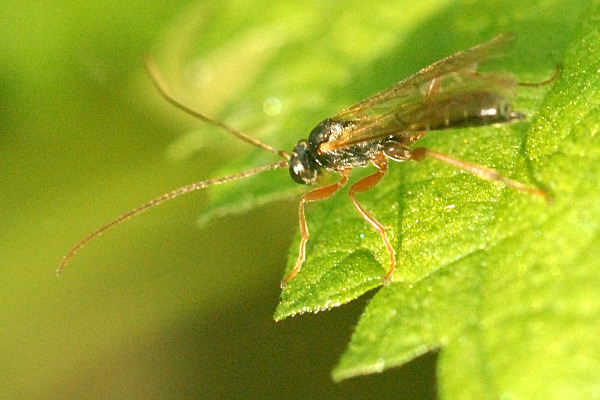
- Plectiscus ridibundus

Scientific classification
- Domain: Eukaryota
- Kingdom: Animalia
- Phylum: Arthropoda
- Class: Insecta
- Order: Hymenoptera
- Family: Ichneumonidae
- Subfamily: Orthocentrinae
- Genus: Plectiscus; Gravenhorst, 1829

= Plectiscus =

Genus of wasps

Plectiscus is a genus of parasitoid wasps belonging to the family Ichneumonidae.

The genus has almost cosmopolitan distribution.

Species:

- Plectiscus agilis (Holmgren, 1858)
- Plectiscus agilitor Aubert, 1981
