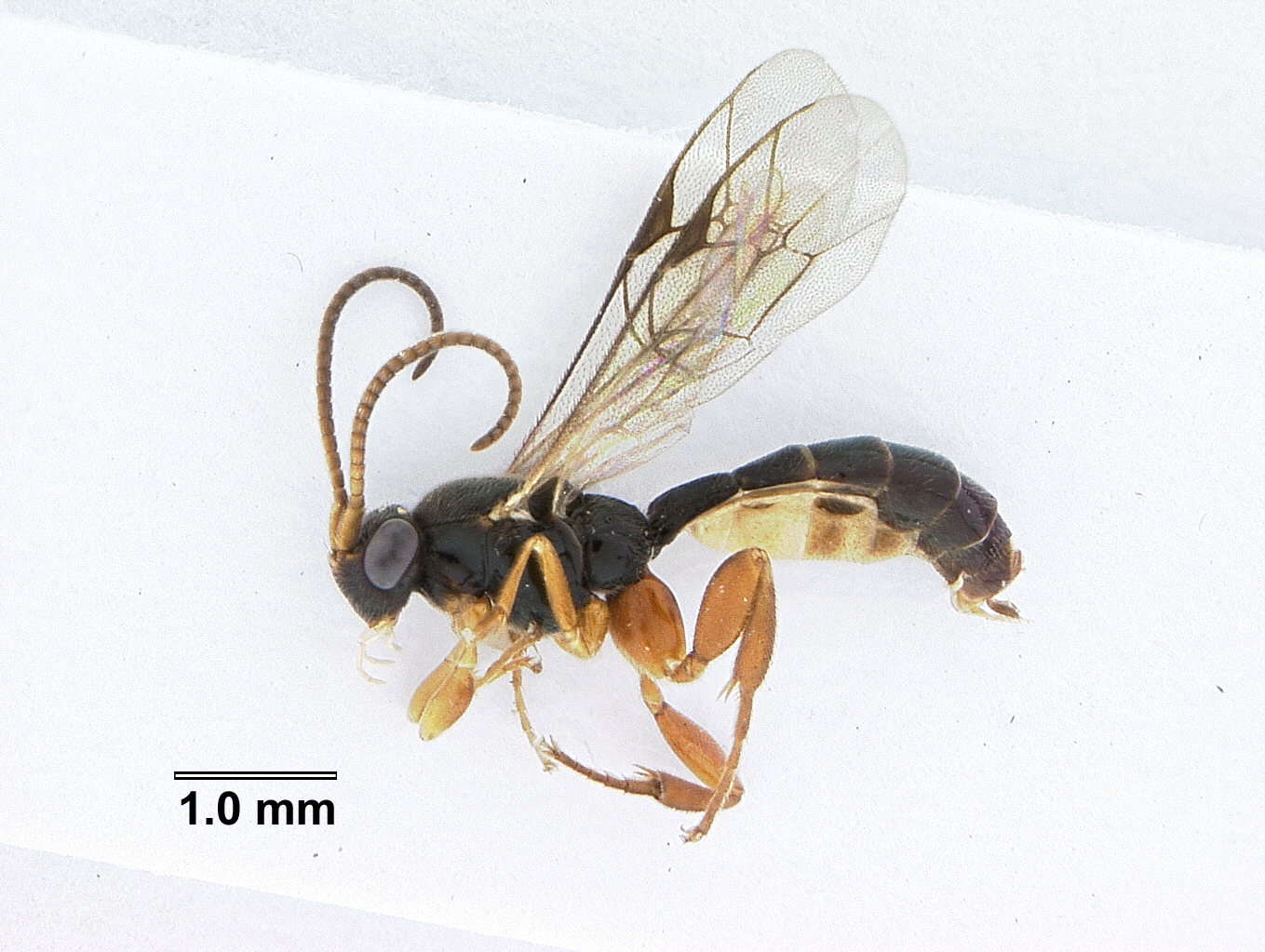

Scientific classification
- Kingdom: Animalia
- Phylum: Arthropoda
- Class: Insecta
- Order: Hymenoptera
- Family: Ichneumonidae
- Subfamily: Orthocentrinae
- Genus: Orthocentrus; Gravenhorst, 1829

= Orthocentrus =

Genus of wasps

Orthocentrus is a genus of ichneumon wasps in the family Ichneumonidae. There are at least 90 described species in Orthocentrus.

== Species ==
These 90 species belong to the genus Orthocentrus:

- Orthocentrus albihumerus Broad^{g}
- Orthocentrus alboscutellum Broad^{g}
- Orthocentrus ambiguus Holmgren, 1858^{c g}
- Orthocentrus anguillae Broad^{g}
- Orthocentrus anomalus Gravenhorst, 1829^{c g}
- Orthocentrus asper (Gravenhorst, 1829)^{c g}
- Orthocentrus attenuatus Holmgren, 1858^{c g}
- Orthocentrus bicoloratus Veijalainen^{g}
- Orthocentrus bilineator Aubert, 1959^{c g}
- Orthocentrus brevipilus Broad^{g}
- Orthocentrus broadi Veijalainen^{g}
- Orthocentrus canariensis Hellen, 1949^{c g}
- Orthocentrus castellanus Ceballos, 1963^{c g}
- Orthocentrus compressicoxis Benoit, 1954^{c g}
- Orthocentrus concrispus Veijalainen^{g}
- Orthocentrus corrugatus Holmgren, 1858^{c g}
- Orthocentrus daucus Gauld, 1984^{c g}
- Orthocentrus decoratus Townes, 1945^{c g}
- Orthocentrus defossus Brues, 1910^{c g}
- Orthocentrus deletus Morley, 1912^{c}
- Orthocentrus elongaticornis (Benoit, 1954)^{c g}
- Orthocentrus excalibur Gauld, 1984^{c g}
- Orthocentrus exiguus Cresson, 1865^{g}
- Orthocentrus facialis Brischke, 1878^{c g}
- Orthocentrus flavifrons Veijalainen^{g}
- Orthocentrus frontator (Zetterstedt, 1838)^{c g}
- Orthocentrus fulvipes Gravenhorst, 1829^{c g}
- Orthocentrus harlequinus Veijalainen^{g}
- Orthocentrus hirsutor Aubert, 1969^{c g}
- Orthocentrus hirtus Benoit, 1955^{c g}
- Orthocentrus hispidus Veijalainen^{g}
- Orthocentrus immundus Seyrig, 1934^{c g}
- Orthocentrus indistinctus Benoit, 1954^{c g}
- Orthocentrus insularis Ashmead, 1894^{c}
- Orthocentrus intermedius Förster, 1850^{c g}
- Orthocentrus lativalvis Benoit, 1954^{c g}
- Orthocentrus limpidus Seyrig, 1935^{c g}
- Orthocentrus lineatus Brischke, 1871^{c g}
- Orthocentrus longiceps Seyrig, 1935^{c g}
- Orthocentrus longicornis Holmgren, 1858^{c g}
- Orthocentrus lucens Provancher, 1879^{c}
- Orthocentrus luteoclypeus Veijalainen^{g}
- Orthocentrus macrocerus Strobl, 1903^{c g}
- Orthocentrus maculae Veijalainen^{g}
- Orthocentrus marginatus Holmgren, 1858^{c g}
- Orthocentrus mediocris Seyrig, 1934^{c g}
- Orthocentrus mishana Veijalainen^{g}
- Orthocentrus monilicornis Holmgren, 1858^{c g}
- Orthocentrus neglectus Förster, 1850^{c g}
- Orthocentrus nicaraguensis Veijalainen^{g}
- Orthocentrus nigricornis Boheman, 1866^{c g}
- Orthocentrus nigristernus Rondani, 1877^{c g}
- Orthocentrus onkonegare Broad^{g}
- Orthocentrus orbitator Aubert, 1963^{c g}
- Orthocentrus pallidifrons (Morley, 1913)^{c g}
- Orthocentrus pallidus Veijalainen^{g}
- Orthocentrus palpalis Brischke, 1892^{c g}
- Orthocentrus patulus Holmgren, 1858^{c g}
- Orthocentrus pentagonum Broad^{g}
- Orthocentrus petiolaris Thomson, 1897^{c g}
- Orthocentrus primus Brues, 1906^{c g}
- Orthocentrus protervus Holmgren, 1858^{c g}
- Orthocentrus pulcher Seyrig, 1934^{c g}
- Orthocentrus punctatissimus Benoit, 1954^{c g}
- Orthocentrus quercus Veijalainen^{g}
- Orthocentrus radialis Thomson, 1897^{c g}
- Orthocentrus rectus Veijalainen^{g}
- Orthocentrus rovensis Seyrig, 1934^{c g}
- Orthocentrus rufescens Brischke, 1871^{c g}
- Orthocentrus rufipes Brischke, 1871^{c g}
- Orthocentrus rugulosus (Provancher, 1883)^{c g}
- Orthocentrus saaksjarvii Veijalainen^{g}
- Orthocentrus sannio Holmgren, 1858^{c g}
- Orthocentrus scurra Veijalainen^{g}
- Orthocentrus semiflavus Seyrig, 1935^{c g}
- Orthocentrus shieldsi Broad^{g}
- Orthocentrus spurius Gravenhorst, 1829^{c g}
- Orthocentrus strigatus Holmgren, 1858^{c g}
- Orthocentrus tenuiflagellum Veijalainen^{g}
- Orthocentrus testaceipes Brischke, 1878^{c}
- Orthocentrus tetrazonatus (Ashmead, 1896)^{c g}
- Orthocentrus thomsoni Roman, 1936^{c g}
- Orthocentrus trichomma Gauld, 1984^{c g}
- Orthocentrus trifasciatus Walsh, 1873^{c g}
- Orthocentrus tuberculatus Brischke, 1891^{c g}
- Orthocentrus umbrocciput Veijalainen^{g}
- Orthocentrus urbanus Seyrig, 1934^{c g}
- Orthocentrus wahlbergi Veijalainen^{g}
- Orthocentrus winnertzii Förster, 1850^{c}
- Orthocentrus zebra Veijalainen^{g}

Data sources: i = ITIS, c = Catalogue of Life, g = GBIF, b = Bugguide.net
