= Allomacrus =

Scientific classification
- Domain: Eukaryota
- Kingdom: Animalia
- Phylum: Arthropoda
- Class: Insecta
- Order: Hymenoptera
- Family: Ichneumonidae
- Subfamily: Cylloceriinae
- Genus: Allomacrus; Förster, 1869

Genus of insects

Allomacrus is a genus of parasitoid wasps belonging to the family Ichneumonidae.

The species of this genus are found in Europe and North America.

Species:

- Allomacrus arcticus (Holmgren, 1880)
- Allomacrus jakuticus Humala, 2002
- Allomacrus longecaudatus (Strobl, 1903)
- Allomacrus subtilis Humala, 2002
- Allomacrus volcanus Humala, 2002
