= Astiphromma =

Scientific classification
- Domain: Eukaryota
- Kingdom: Animalia
- Phylum: Arthropoda
- Class: Insecta
- Order: Hymenoptera
- Family: Ichneumonidae
- Subfamily: Mesochorinae
- Genus: Astiphromma; Förster, 1869

Genus of wasps

Astiphromma is a genus of parasitoid wasps belonging to the family Ichneumonidae.

The genus was first described by Förster in 1869.

The species of this genus are found in Eurasia and North America.

Species:

- Astiphromma anale
- Astiphromma aggressor (Fabricius, 1804)
- Astiphromma buccatum (Thomson, 1886)
- Astiphromma flagellator
- Astiphromma italicum Schwenke, 1999
- Astiphromma tenuicorne
