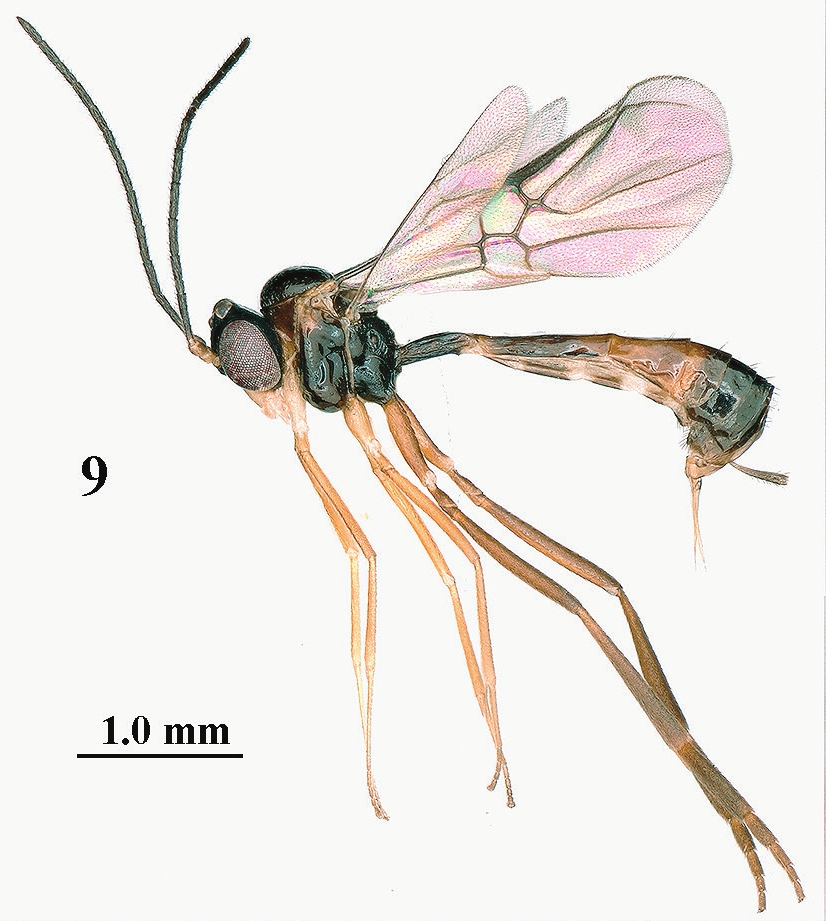
- Hybrizon buccatus

Scientific classification
- Kingdom: Animalia
- Phylum: Arthropoda
- Clade: Pancrustacea
- Class: Insecta
- Order: Hymenoptera
- Family: Ichneumonidae
- Subfamily: Hybrizontinae
- Genus: Hybrizon; Fallén, 1813

= Hybrizon =

Genus of wasps

Hybrizon is a genus in the subfamily Hybrizontinae of ichneumonid parasitoid wasps.

== Description and distribution ==
Hybrizon lacks the 2m-cu crossvein present in most other ichneumonids. It is a small and slender wasp with short palpi and fused 2nd and 3rd metasomal segments.

This genus has a holarctic distribution.

== Biology ==
Hybrizon is unusual in that it is an endoparasitoid of ants. Female wasps oviposit into larval ants while they are being transported outside the nest by worker ants. Oviposition occurs very quickly, in less than one second. Immature Hybrizon pupate within the ant nest without spinning a cocoon.
