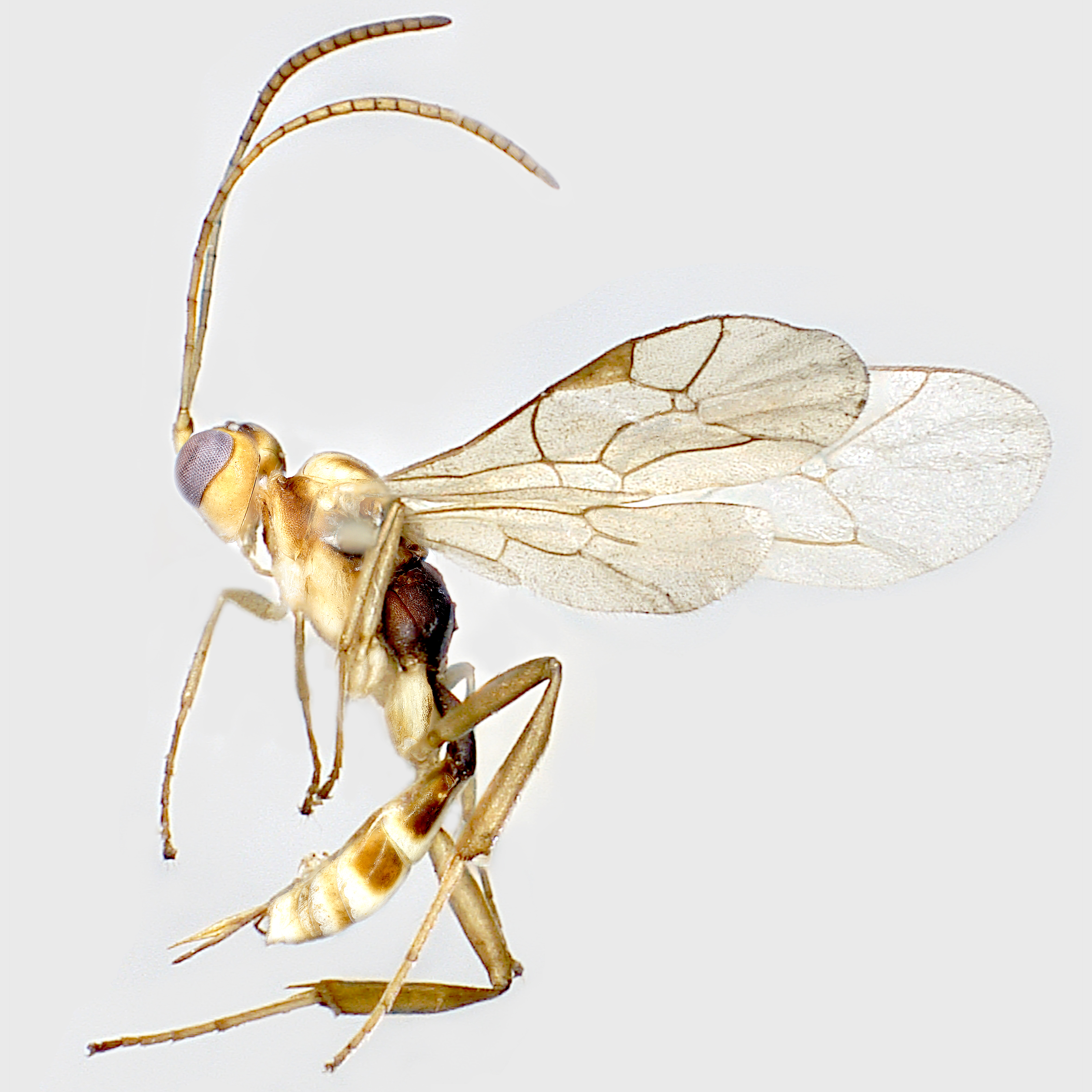
- Lateral view of the specimen

Scientific classification
- Kingdom: Animalia
- Phylum: Arthropoda
- Clade: Pancrustacea
- Class: Insecta
- Order: Hymenoptera
- Family: Ichneumonidae
- Subfamily: Pedunculinae
- Genus: Attenboroughnculus; De Ketelaere & Broad, 2026

Type species
- Attenboroughnculus tau De Ketelaere & Broad, 2026

= Attenboroughnculus =

Genus of parasitic wasps

Attenboroughnculus is a genus of ichneumon parasitic wasps in the subfamily Pedunculinae. The genus was erected by De Ketelaere, Pullar, and Broad in 2026, based on a single female specimen found in Chile. Attenboroughnculus is a monotypic genus, containing the sole species Attenboroughnculus tau. It is one of the four newest described genera of Pedunculinae, the other three being Adelphion, Monganella, and Pedunculus.

== Etymology ==
The insect's metasoma, showing its T-shaped markings

The name Attenboroughculus is a portmanteau and an eponym, named after Sir David Attenborough and merged with the subfamily type genus Pedunculus. The genus was named in celebration of Attenborough's 100th birthday, and to honour his work inspiring generations to appreciate nature and pursue natural history.

The specific epithet of the sole species, A. tau, is a reference to the insect's two T-shaped markings on its abdomen.

== Description ==
The body length of the specimen is ~3.5 mm (~0.14 in) long. Its prominent features are its strongly curved abdominal segment, polished groove on its hind legs, and subtle, teethlike structures on its ovipositor. It's front wing has a span of 3.9 mm (0.15 in).

== History ==
The type specimen was collected in 1983 in Valdivia Province, Chile and found its way in the Natural History Museum in London, where it went unsorted for over 40 years. Augustijn De Ketelaere, a volunteer and graduate student from Ghent University, discovered the insect while examining various unidentified ichneumon wasps in the museum's collection. The principle curator of insects at the museum, Dr. Gavin Broad, corroborated the distinctiveness of the specimen, leading to the erection of the new genus with the help of De Ketelaere and Jennifer Pullar, the science communications manager of the museum.

As of 2026, there is only one known specimen recorded of Attenboroughnculus tau.

== See also ==
- List of things named after David Attenborough and his works
