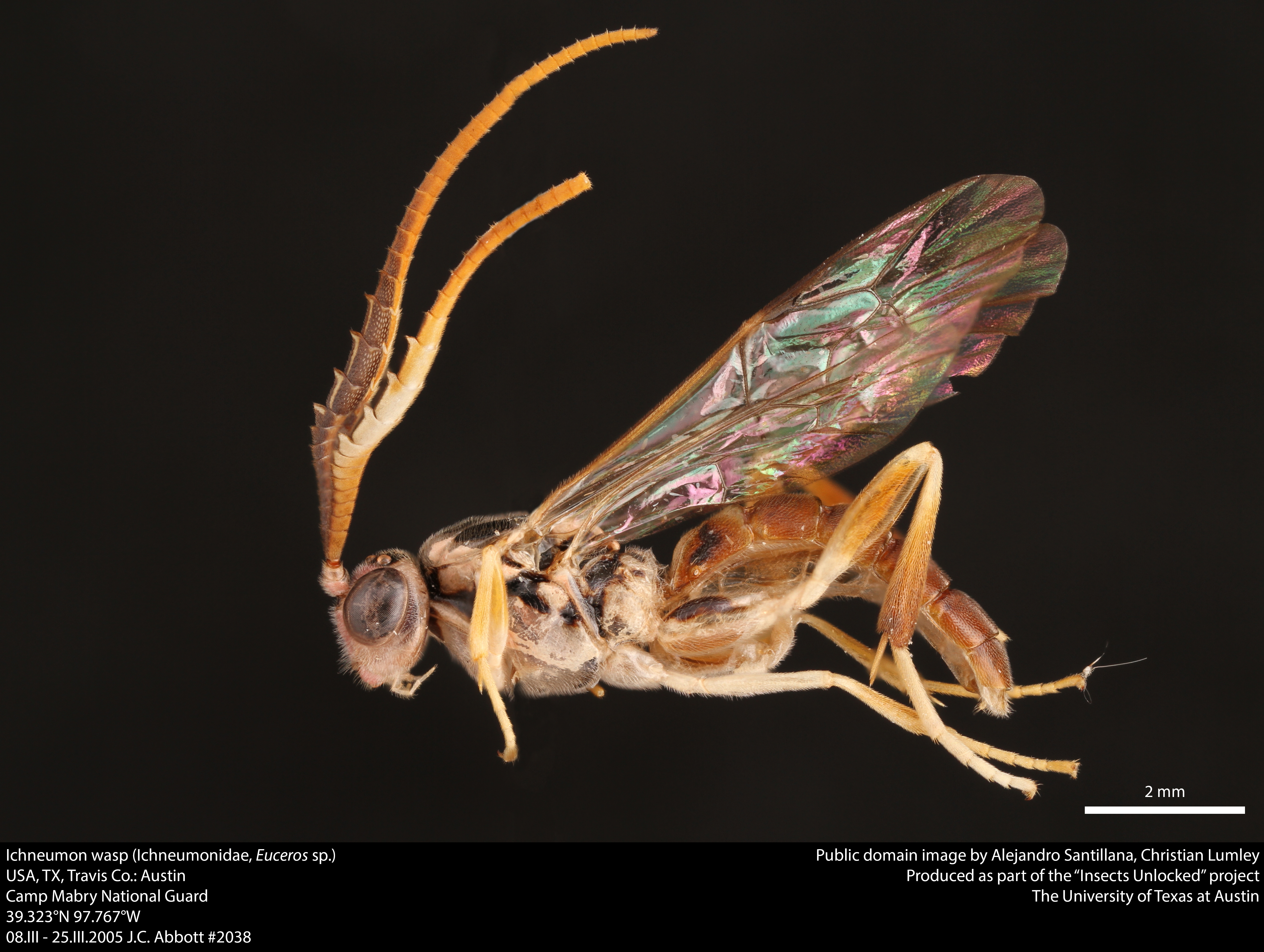

Scientific classification
- Kingdom: Animalia
- Phylum: Arthropoda
- Class: Insecta
- Order: Hymenoptera
- Family: Ichneumonidae
- Subfamily: Eucerotinae
- Genus: Euceros; Gravenhorst, 1829

= Euceros =

Genus of wasps

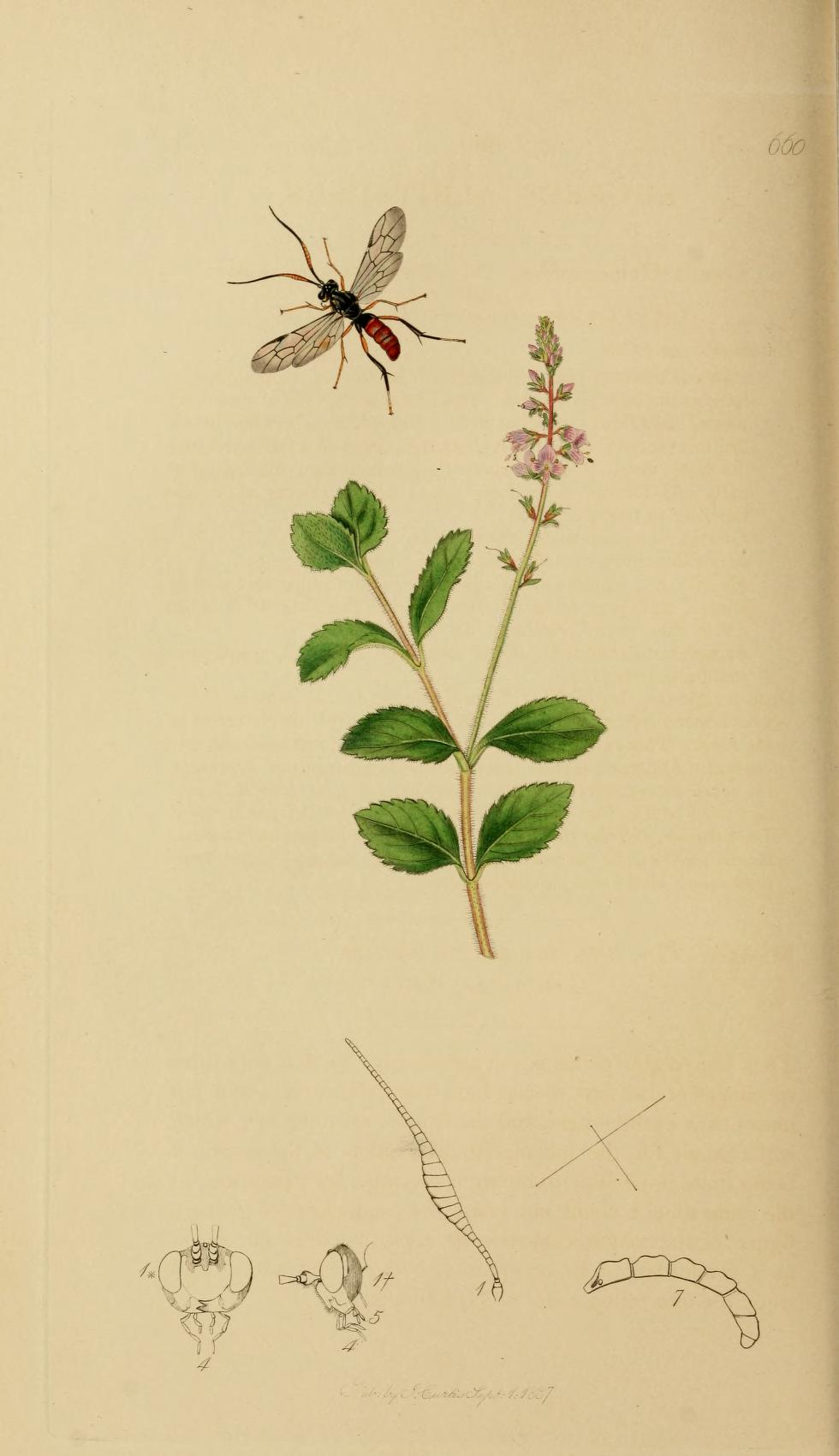
Euceros albitarsus Curtis Illustration from British Entomology

Euceros is a cosmopolitan genus of ichneumon wasps in the family Ichneumonidae.

== Taxonomy ==
The genus has previously been placed in Tryphoninae by Townes. It is sister to the genus Barronia.

== Distribution ==
Euceros is primarily found in the Holarctic, plus one species each in Australia and Madagascar.

== Select species ==
These 48 species belong to the genus Euceros:

- Euceros albibasalis Uchida, 1932^{c g}
- Euceros albitarsus Curtis, 1837^{c g}
- Euceros albomarginatus Cushman, 1922^{c g}
- Euceros annulicornis Barron, 1978^{c g}
- Euceros arcuatus Barron, 1976^{c g}
- Euceros canadensis Cresson, 1869^{c g}
- Euceros chinensis Kasparyan, 1984^{c g}
- Euceros clypealis Barron, 1978^{c g}
- Euceros congregatus Barron, 1976^{c g}
- Euceros coxalis Barron, 1978^{c g}
- Euceros croceus Barron, 1978^{c g}
- Euceros decorus Walley, 1932^{c g}
- Euceros dentatus Barron, 1978^{c g}
- Euceros digitalis Walley, 1932^{c g}
- Euceros enargiae Barron, 1976^{c g}
- Euceros faciens Davis, 1897^{c g}
- Euceros flavescens Cresson, 1869^{c g}
- Euceros frigidus Cresson, 1869^{c g}
- Euceros gilvus Barron, 1978^{c g}
- Euceros incisurae Barron, 1978^{c g}
- Euceros latitarsus Barron, 1978^{c g}
- Euceros limatus Barron, 1978^{c g}
- Euceros maculicornis Barron, 1978^{c g}
- Euceros madecassus Seyrig, 1934^{c g}
- Euceros medialis Cresson, 1869^{c g}
- Euceros melanosoma Barron, 1976^{c g}
- Euceros melleus Barron, 1978^{c g}
- Euceros obesus Davis, 1897^{c g}
- Euceros obliquus Barron, 1976^{c g}
- Euceros pectinis Barron, 1978^{c g}
- Euceros pinguipes Barron, 1976^{c g}
- Euceros pruinosus (Gravenhorst, 1829)^{c g}
- Euceros ribesii Barron, 1976^{c g}
- Euceros ruber Barron, 1976^{c g}
- Euceros ruficeps Barron, 1978^{c g}
- Euceros rufocinctus (Ashmead, 1906)^{c g}
- Euceros sachalinensis Kasparyan, 1992^{c g}
- Euceros sanguineus Davis, 1897^{c g}
- Euceros schizophrenus Kasparyan, 1984^{c g}
- Euceros semiothisae Barron, 1976^{c g}
- Euceros sensibus Uchida, 1930^{c g}
- Euceros serricornis (Haliday, 1838)^{c g}
- Euceros signicornis Barron, 1978^{c g}
- Euceros superbus Kriechbaumer, 1888^{c g}
- Euceros taiwanus Kasparyan, 1992^{c g}
- Euceros thoracicus Cresson, 1869^{c g}
- Euceros tunetanus (Schmiedeknecht, 1900)^{c g}
- Euceros unispina Kasparyan, 1984^{c g}

Data sources: i = ITIS, c = Catalogue of Life, g = GBIF, b = Bugguide.net
