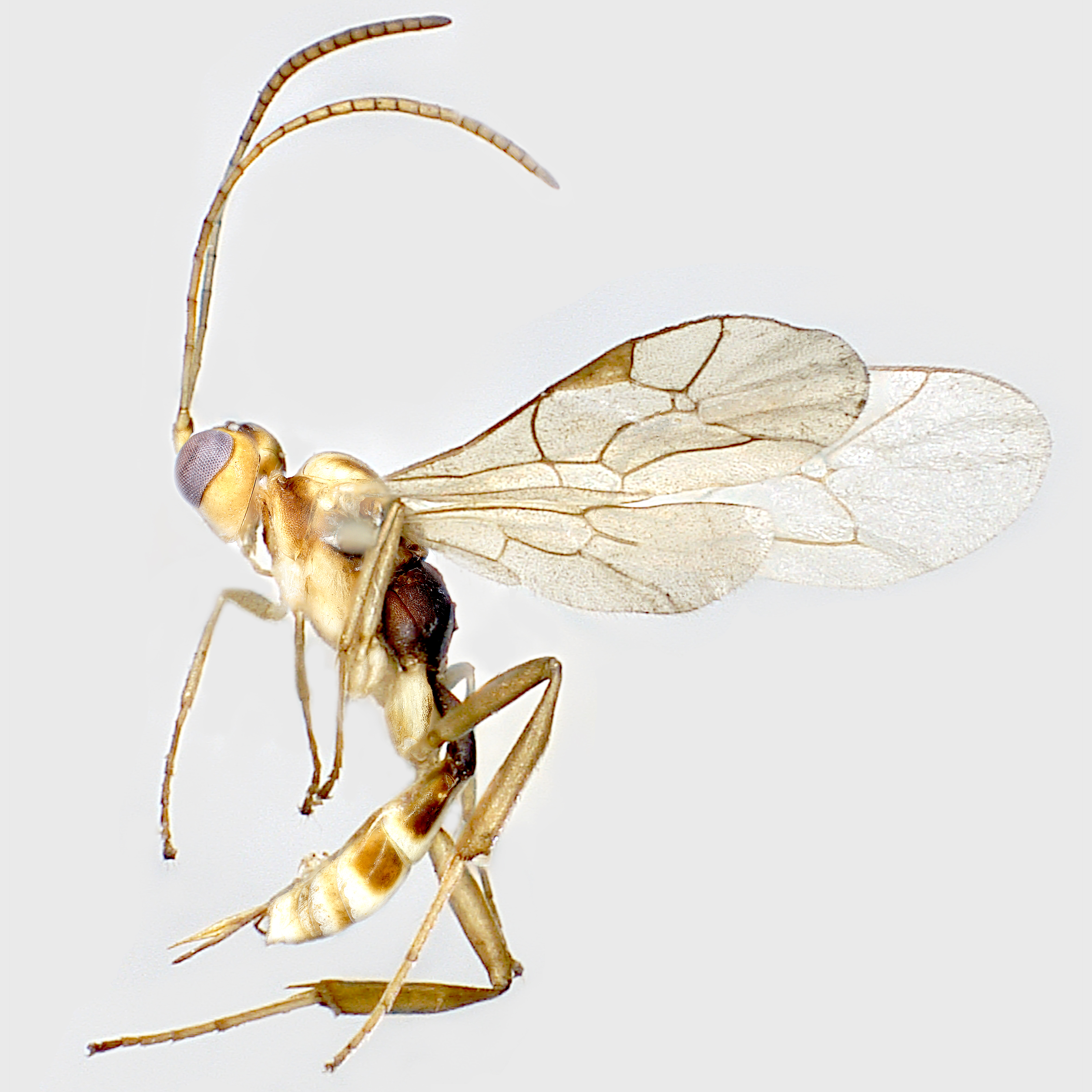
- Attenboroughnculus tau

Scientific classification
- Kingdom: Animalia
- Phylum: Arthropoda
- Clade: Pancrustacea
- Class: Insecta
- Order: Hymenoptera
- Superfamily: Ichneumonoidea
- Family: Ichneumonidae
- Subfamily: Pedunculinae; Porter, 1998

= Pedunculinae =

Subfamily of parasitic wasps

The Pedunculinae are a subfamily of ichneumon parasitic wasps erected by Charles Porter in 1998. De Ketelaere, Pullar and Broad (2026) provide a key to the genera, including the newly (2026) identified Attenboroughnculus.

== Genera ==
As of May 2026, the Pedunculinae includes the following genera (all monotypic):

1. Adelphion - A. pallibasis Townes, 1969: Tasmania
2. Attenboroughnculus - A. tau De Ketelaere, Pullar & Broad, 2026: Chile
3. Monganella - M. variegata Gauld, 1984: Australia
4. Pedunculus - P. major Townes, 1969 - type genus from Chile
