= Aperileptus =

Scientific classification
- Kingdom: Animalia
- Phylum: Arthropoda
- Clade: Pancrustacea
- Class: Insecta
- Order: Hymenoptera
- Family: Ichneumonidae
- Subfamily: Orthocentrinae
- Genus: Aperileptus; Förster, 1869

Genus of wasps

Aperileptus is a genus of parasitoid wasps belonging to the family Ichneumonidae.

The genus was first described by Arnold Förster in 1869.

The genus has almost cosmopolitan distribution.

Species:

- Aperileptus albipalpus
- Aperileptus impurus
