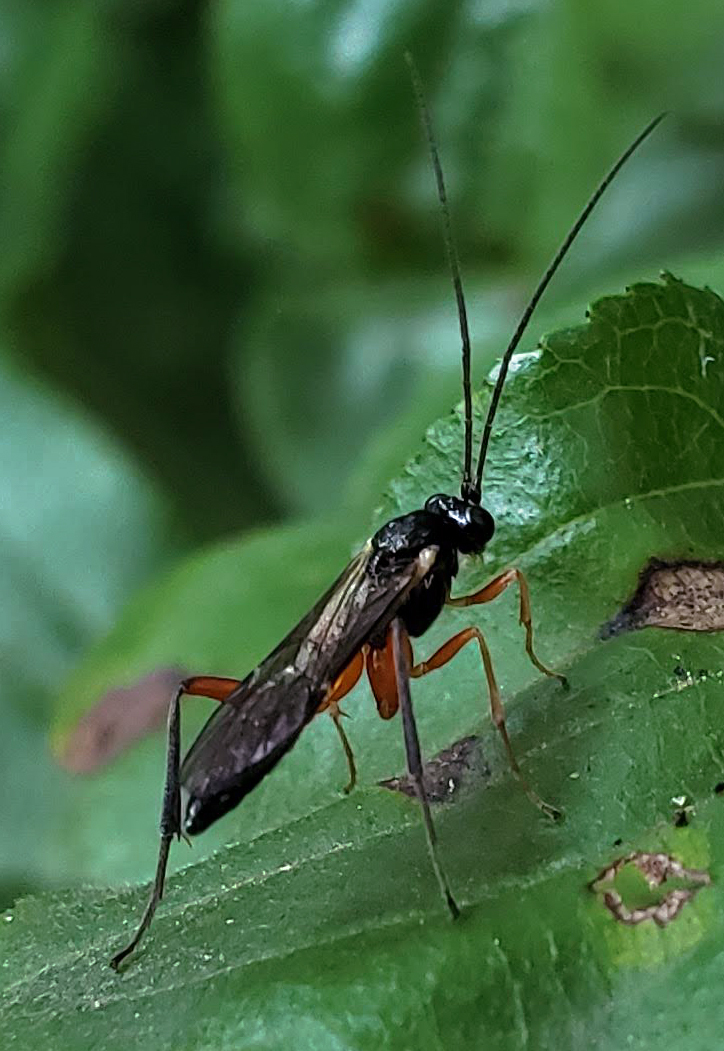
- Cylloceria caligata

Scientific classification
- Domain: Eukaryota
- Kingdom: Animalia
- Phylum: Arthropoda
- Class: Insecta
- Order: Hymenoptera
- Family: Ichneumonidae
- Subfamily: Cylloceriinae
- Genus: Cylloceria; Schiodte, 1838

= Cylloceria =

Genus of insects

Cylloceria is a genus of parasitoid wasps belonging to the family Ichneumonidae.

The species of this genus are found in Europe and America.

== Species ==
The following species are recognised in the genus Cylloceria:

- Cylloceria aino (Uchida, 1928)
- Cylloceria alpigena (Strobl, 1902)
- Cylloceria alvaradoi Gauld, 1991
- Cylloceria aquilonia Dasch, 1992
- Cylloceria arizonica Dasch, 1992
- Cylloceria barbouraki Gauld, 1991
- Cylloceria borealis (Roman, 1925)
- Cylloceria brachycera Humala, 2002
- Cylloceria calva Dasch, 1992
- Cylloceria ebbae Liu & Reshchikov, 2019
- Cylloceria fusciventris (Hellen, 1940)
- Cylloceria imperspicua Rossem, 1987
- Cylloceria impolita Dasch, 1992
- Cylloceria invicta Rossem, 1987
- Cylloceria melancholica (Gravenhorst, 1820)
- Cylloceria mexicana Kasparyan & Ruiz-Cancino, 2003
- Cylloceria occupator (Gravenhorst, 1829)
- Cylloceria orientalis Humala, 2002
- Cylloceria rubrica Dasch, 1992
- Cylloceria simplicicornis (Strobl, 1901)
- Cylloceria striatula Dasch, 1992
- Cylloceria sylvestris (Gravenhorst, 1829)
- Cylloceria tenuicornis Humala, 2002
- Cylloceria tincochacae Viereck, 1913
- Cylloceria tipulivora Chao, 1994
- Cylloceria trishae Gauld, 1991
- Cylloceria ugaldevi Gauld, 1991
- Cylloceria ussuriensis Humala, 2002
- BOLD:AAG7624 (Cylloceria sp.)
- BOLD:AAG7681 (Cylloceria sp.)
- BOLD:AAG7714 (Cylloceria sp.)
- BOLD:AAG8324 (Cylloceria sp.)
- BOLD:AAG9161 (Cylloceria sp.)
- BOLD:AAQ2728 (Cylloceria sp.)
- BOLD:AAU8248 (Cylloceria sp.)
- BOLD:AAU9744 (Cylloceria sp.)
- BOLD:AAU9745 (Cylloceria sp.)
- BOLD:ACE8109 (Cylloceria sp.)
- BOLD:ACI7218 (Cylloceria sp.)
- BOLD:ACK2188 (Cylloceria sp.)
- BOLD:ACN9046 (Cylloceria sp.)
- BOLD:ACQ9062 (Cylloceria sp.)
- BOLD:ACT2329 (Cylloceria sp.)
- BOLD:ACT3190 (Cylloceria sp.)
- BOLD:ACU3890 (Cylloceria sp.)
- BOLD:ACU3891 (Cylloceria sp.)
- BOLD:ACU3892 (Cylloceria sp.)
- BOLD:ADJ9180 (Cylloceria sp.)
- BOLD:ADK4470 (Cylloceria sp.)
- BOLD:AEF0145 (Cylloceria sp.)
- BOLD:AEN9306 (Cylloceria sp.)
