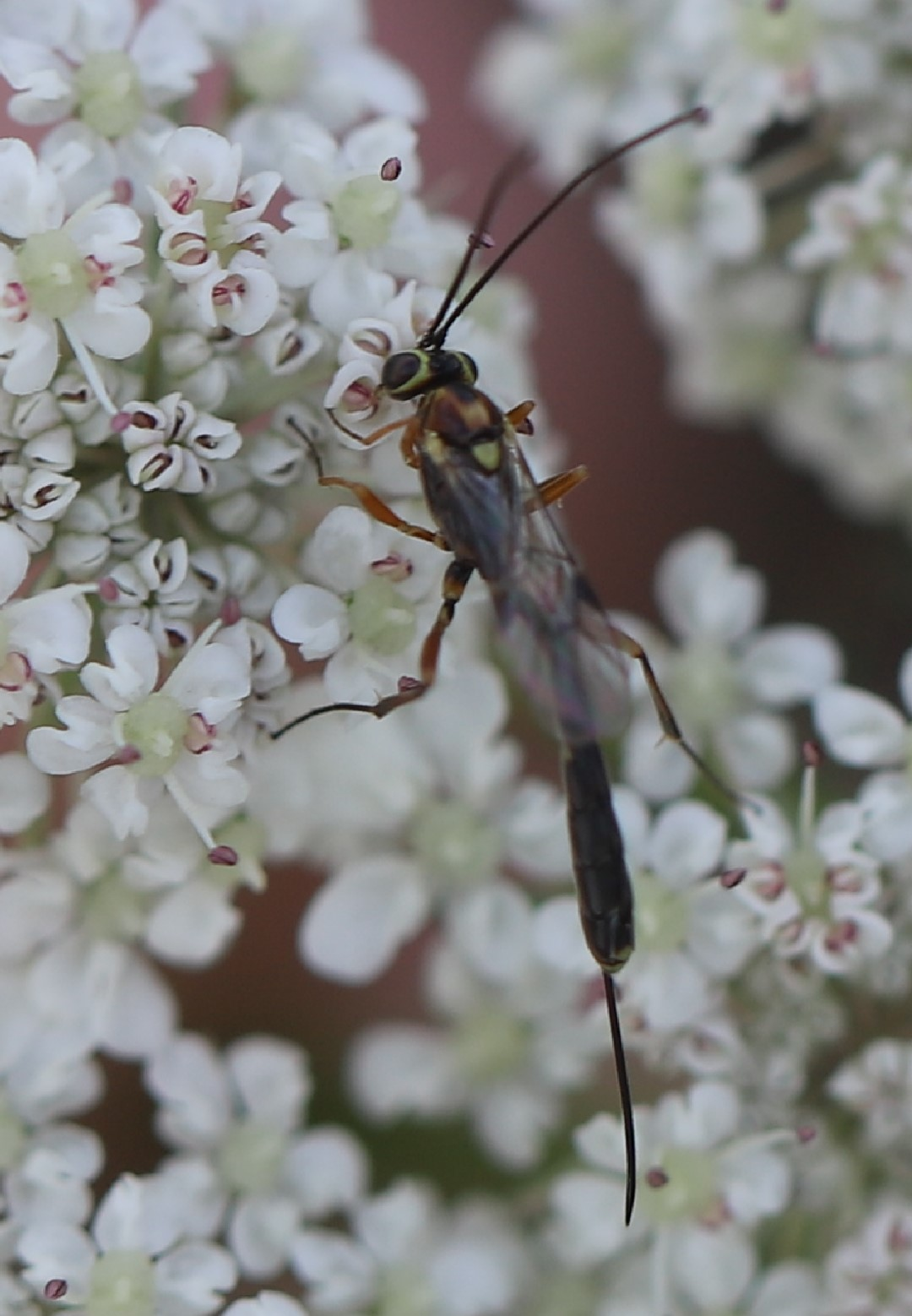
- Temelucha interruptor

Scientific classification
- Domain: Eukaryota
- Kingdom: Animalia
- Phylum: Arthropoda
- Class: Insecta
- Order: Hymenoptera
- Family: Ichneumonidae
- Subfamily: Cremastinae
- Genus: Temelucha; Förster, 1869

= Temelucha =

Genus of wasps

Temelucha is a genus of parasitoid wasps belonging to the family Ichneumonidae, with a cosmopolitan distribution and over 200 constituent species.
