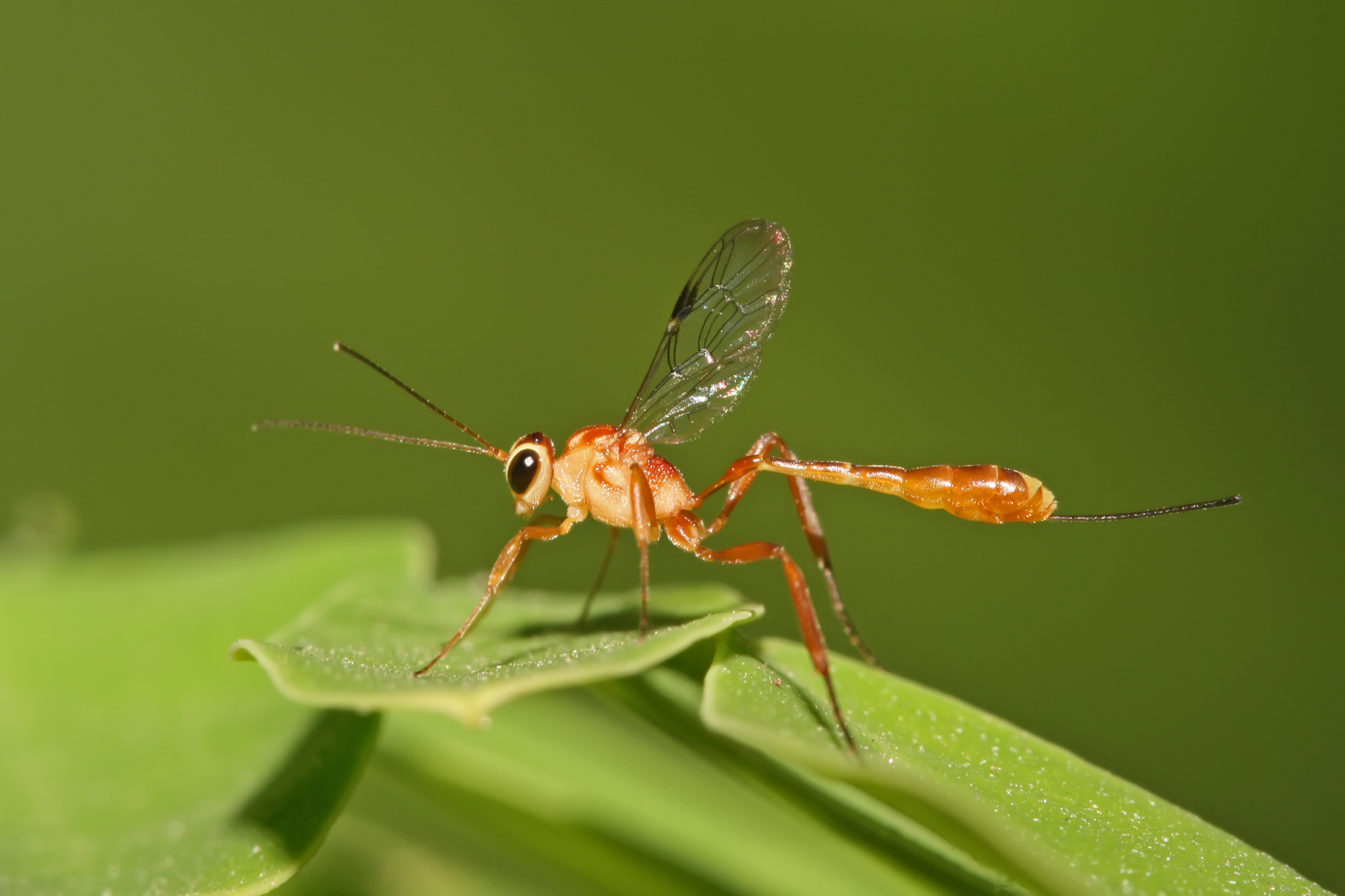

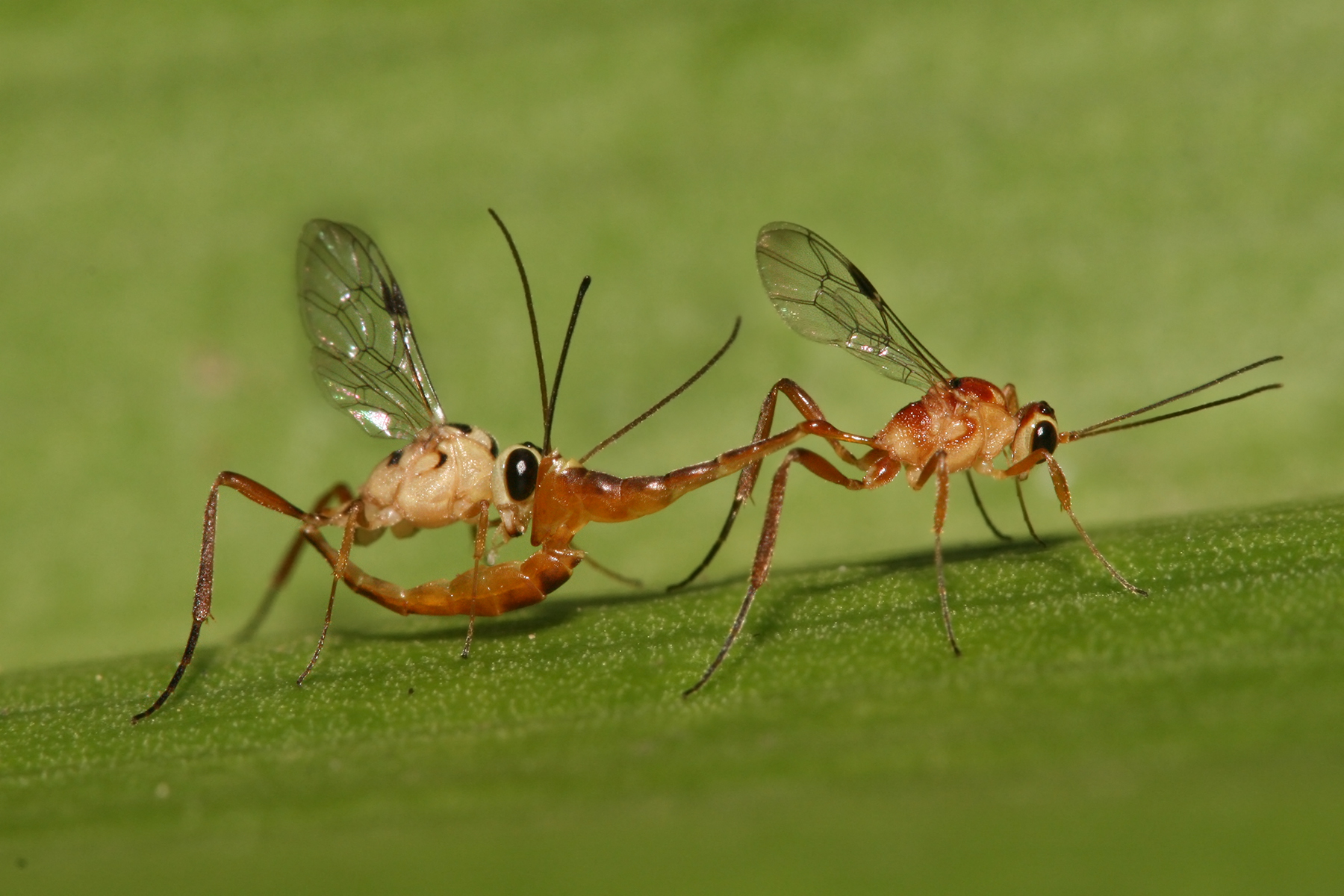
- Cremastinae mating

Scientific classification
- Kingdom: Animalia
- Phylum: Arthropoda
- Clade: Pancrustacea
- Class: Insecta
- Order: Hymenoptera
- Family: Ichneumonidae
- Subfamily: Cremastinae; Förster, 1869

= Cremastinae =

Subfamily of wasps

Cremastinae is a worldwide subfamily of the parasitic wasp family Ichneumonidae.

Cremastinae are koinobiont endoparasitoids of Lepidoptera; and sometimes, Coleoptera larvae in tunnels, leaf rolls, buds and galls.

Cremastines are usually slender and brightly colored wasps, though exceptions exist. They are most commonly found in warm and dry habitats such as coastal areas or heathlands.

== Genera ==
- Belesica
- Celor
- Creagura
- Cremastus
- Dimophora
- Dolichopselephus
- Eiphosoma
- Eucremastoides
- Eucremastus
- Eurygenys
- Eutanygaster
- Fafana
- Gahus
- Kasparyania
- Mecotes
- Narolskyia
- Neleothymus
- Nothocremastus
- Noxocremastus
- Pimplomorpha
- Polyconus
- Pristomerus
- Pseudocremastus
- Pseuderipternus
- Ptilobaptus
- Ricrena
- Sustenus
- Tanychela
- Temelucha
- Trathala
- Xiphosomella

== Bibliography ==
- Townes, H.K. (1971): Genera of Ichneumonidae, Part 4 (Cremastinae, Phrudinae, Tersilochinae, Ophioninae, Mesochorinae, Metopiinae, Anomalinae, Acaenitinae, Microleptinae, Orthopelmatinae, Collyriinae, Orthocentrinae, Diplazontinae). Memoirs of the American Entomological Institute 17: 1–372.
