= Labenopimplinae =

Labenopimplinae Temporal range: Cenomanian–Turonian

Scientific classification
- Kingdom: Animalia
- Phylum: Arthropoda
- Clade: Pancrustacea
- Class: Insecta
- Order: Hymenoptera
- Family: Ichneumonidae
- Subfamily: †Labenopimplinae; Kopylov, 2010

Subfamily of wasps

Labenopimplinae are an extinct subfamily of the parasitic wasp family Ichneumonidae. Labenopimplinae are known from the Cenomanian of the Russian Far East and Turonian of Orapa, Botswana. The subfamily includes five genera with 13 species. The subfamily is highly polymorphic and combines features of the Labeninae and Pimplinae.

== List of genera ==
- Armanopimpla
- Labenopimpla
- Micropimpla
- Ramulimonstrum
- Rugopimpla
