= Proclitus =

Scientific classification
- Domain: Eukaryota
- Kingdom: Animalia
- Phylum: Arthropoda
- Class: Insecta
- Order: Hymenoptera
- Family: Ichneumonidae
- Genus: Proclitus; Förster, 1869

Genus of insects

Proclitus is a genus of parasitoid wasps belonging to the family Ichneumonidae.

The genus has almost cosmopolitan distribution.

Species:

- Proclitus albidipes Forster, 1871
- Proclitus ardentis Rossem, 1987
- Proclitus attentus Forster, 1871
- Proclitus bicolor Dasch, 1992
- Proclitus comes (Haliday, 1838)
- Proclitus edwardsi Roman, 1923
- Proclitus equatorius (Morley, 1912)
- Proclitus extensor Dasch, 1992
- Proclitus floridanus Dasch, 1992
- Proclitus foveatus Dasch, 1992
- Proclitus fulvicornis Forster, 1871
- Proclitus fulvipectus Forster, 1871
- Proclitus heterocerus (Thomson, 1888)
- Proclitus isolatus Benoit, 1957
- Proclitus ligatus Seyrig, 1934
- Proclitus paganus (Haliday, 1838)
- Proclitus paradoxus (Rossem, 1991)
- Proclitus praetor (Haliday, 1838)
- Proclitus rudis Forster, 1871
- Proclitus savaiiensis (Fullaway, 1940)
- Proclitus septentrionalis Dasch, 1992
- Proclitus socius (Haliday, 1838)
- Proclitus speciosus Dasch, 1992
- Proclitus subsulcatus Forster, 1871
- Proclitus tricolor (Kriechbaumer, 1896)
- Proclitus zonatus (Gravenhorst, 1829)
