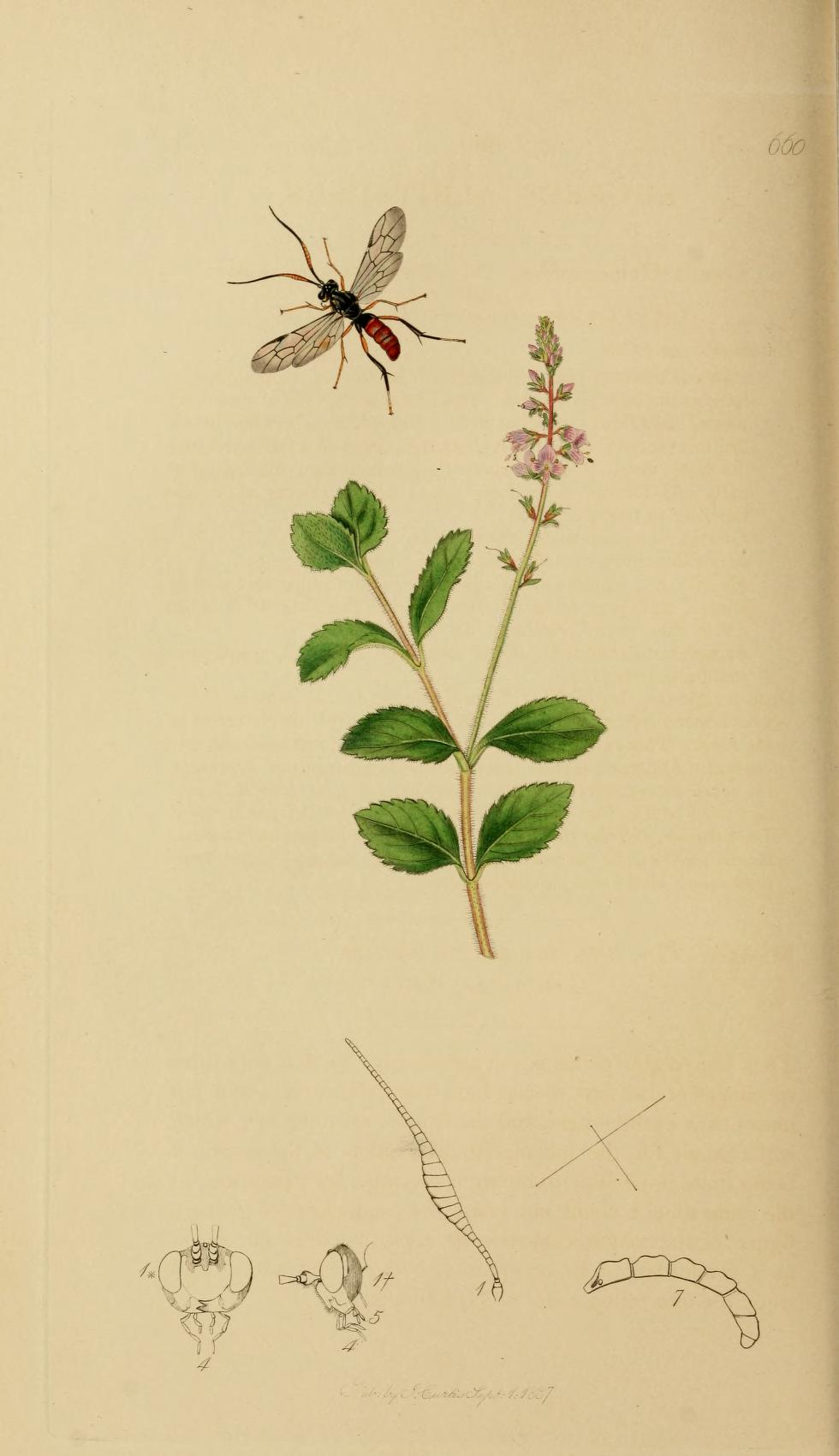
- Euceros albitarsus Curtis Illustration from British Entomology

Scientific classification
- Kingdom: Animalia
- Phylum: Arthropoda
- Clade: Pancrustacea
- Class: Insecta
- Order: Hymenoptera
- Family: Ichneumonidae
- Subfamily: Eucerotinae; Viereck, 1919

Synonyms
- Eumesiides Thomson, 1883; Eucerotini Hopper, 1959

= Eucerotinae =

Subfamily of insects

Eucerotinae is a worldwide subfamily of the parasitic wasp family Ichneumonidae with two genera, Euceros and Barronia.

== Taxonomy ==
This group was treated as Eucerotini, a tribe of Tryphoninae, by Townes, and was used to distinguish the genus Euceros from the rest of the subfamily. The tribe was later elevated to subfamily status as Eucerotinae due to differences in all developmental stages and differences in biology. A second genus, Barronia, was described for the subfamily by Gauld and Wahl in 2002.
