= Hybrizontinae =

Scientific classification
- Kingdom: Animalia
- Phylum: Arthropoda
- Clade: Pancrustacea
- Class: Insecta
- Order: Hymenoptera
- Family: Ichneumonidae
- Subfamily: Hybrizontinae; Blanchard, 1845

Genera
- Eurypterna; Ghilaromma; Hybrizon

Synonyms
- Paxylommatinae

Subfamily of wasps

Hybrizontinae is a subfamily of parasitoid wasps in the family Ichneumonidae. The subfamily was previously called Paxylommatinae, and has in the past been considered part of Braconidae, or a separate family altogether.

== Genera ==
- Eurypterna Forster, 1862
- Ghilaromma Tobias, 1988
- Hybrizon Fallén, 1813
