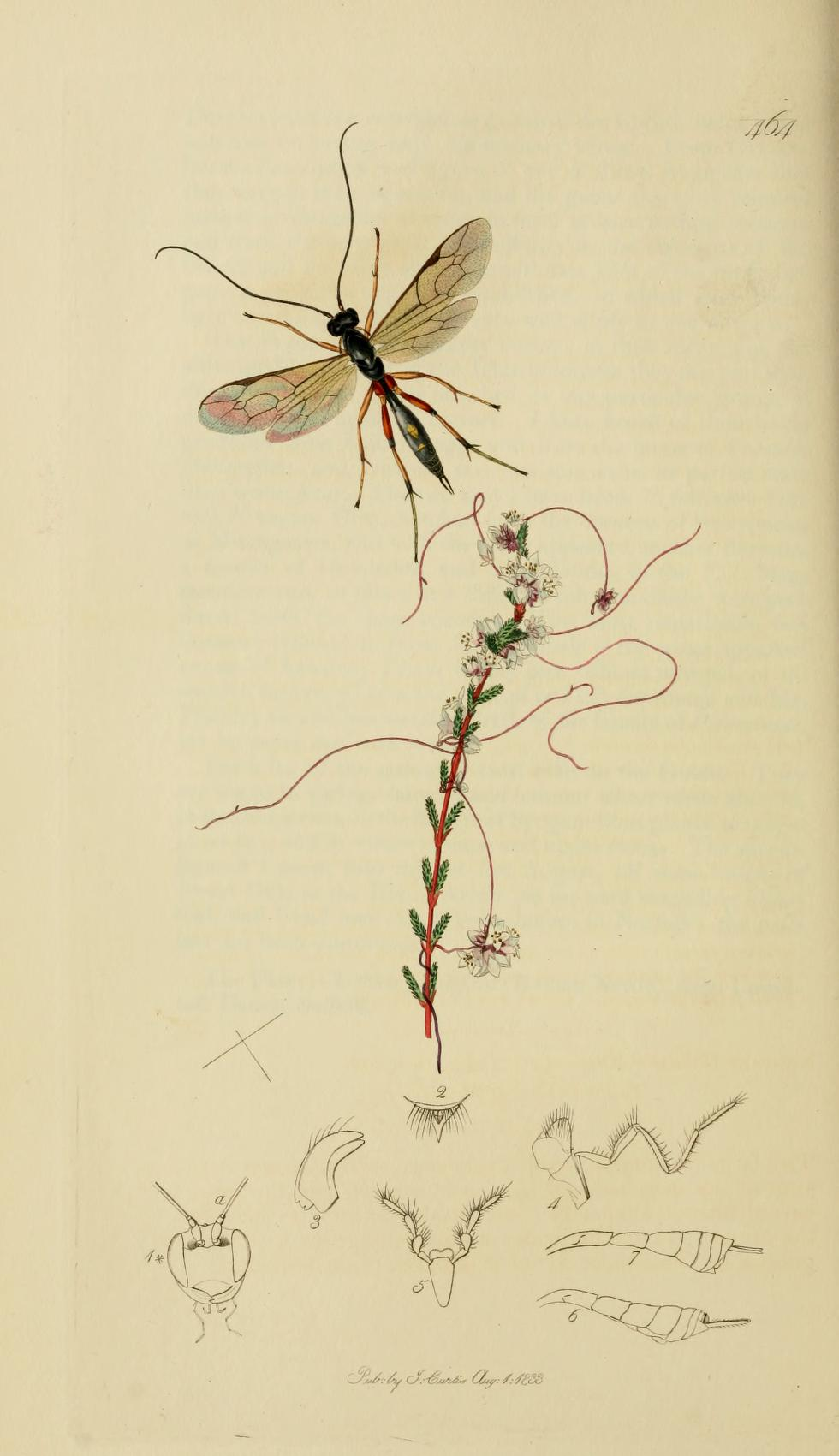
- Astiphromma sericans illustration from British Entomology

Scientific classification
- Kingdom: Animalia
- Phylum: Arthropoda
- Clade: Pancrustacea
- Class: Insecta
- Order: Hymenoptera
- Family: Ichneumonidae
- Subfamily: Mesochorinae; Förster, 1869

= Mesochorinae =

Subfamily of wasps

Mesochorinae is a worldwide subfamily of the parasitic wasp family Ichneumonidae.

Mesochorinae are koinobiont hyperparasitoids of ectoparasitic or endoparasitic Ichneumonoidea, and, less frequently, of Tachinidae (Diptera). There are 10 genera.

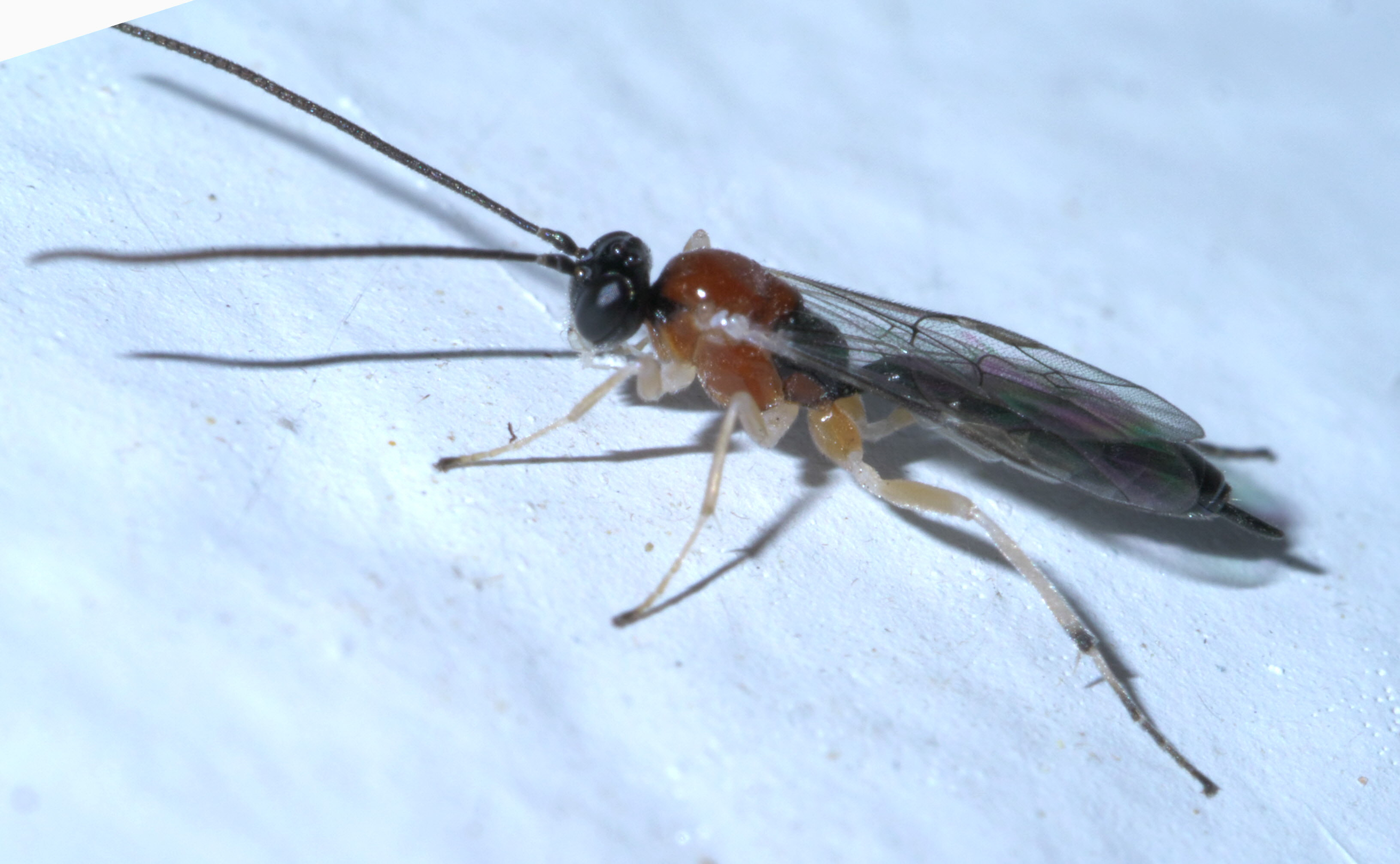
Mesochorinae

== Genera ==
These genera belong to the subfamily Mesochorinae:

- Artherola Wahl, 1993^{c g}
- Astiphromma Förster, 1869^{c g b}
- Chineater Wahl, 1993^{c g}
- Cidaphus Förster, 1869^{c g b}
- Latilumbus Townes, 1971^{c g}
- Lepidura Townes, 1971^{c g}
- Mesochorus Gravenhorst, 1829^{c g b}
- Planochorus Schwenke, 2004^{c g}
- Thamester Wahl, 1993^{c g}
- Varnado Wahl, 1993^{c g}

Data sources: i = ITIS, c = Catalogue of Life, g = GBIF, b = Bugguide.net
