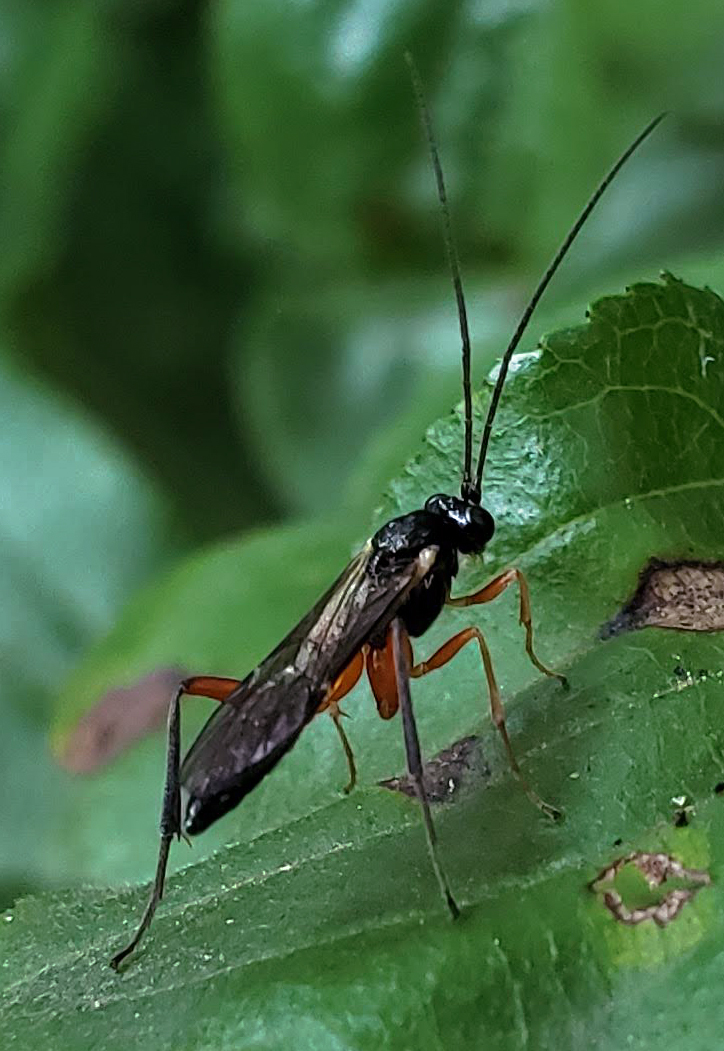
- Cylloceria caligata

Scientific classification
- Domain: Eukaryota
- Kingdom: Animalia
- Phylum: Arthropoda
- Class: Insecta
- Order: Hymenoptera
- Family: Ichneumonidae
- Subfamily: Cylloceriinae; Wahl, 1990

Genera
- Allomacrus Förster, 1869; Cylloceria Schiodte, 1838

= Cylloceriinae =

Genus of insects

Cylloceriinae is a subfamily of parasitoid wasps belonging to the family Ichneumonidae. It contains two genera.
