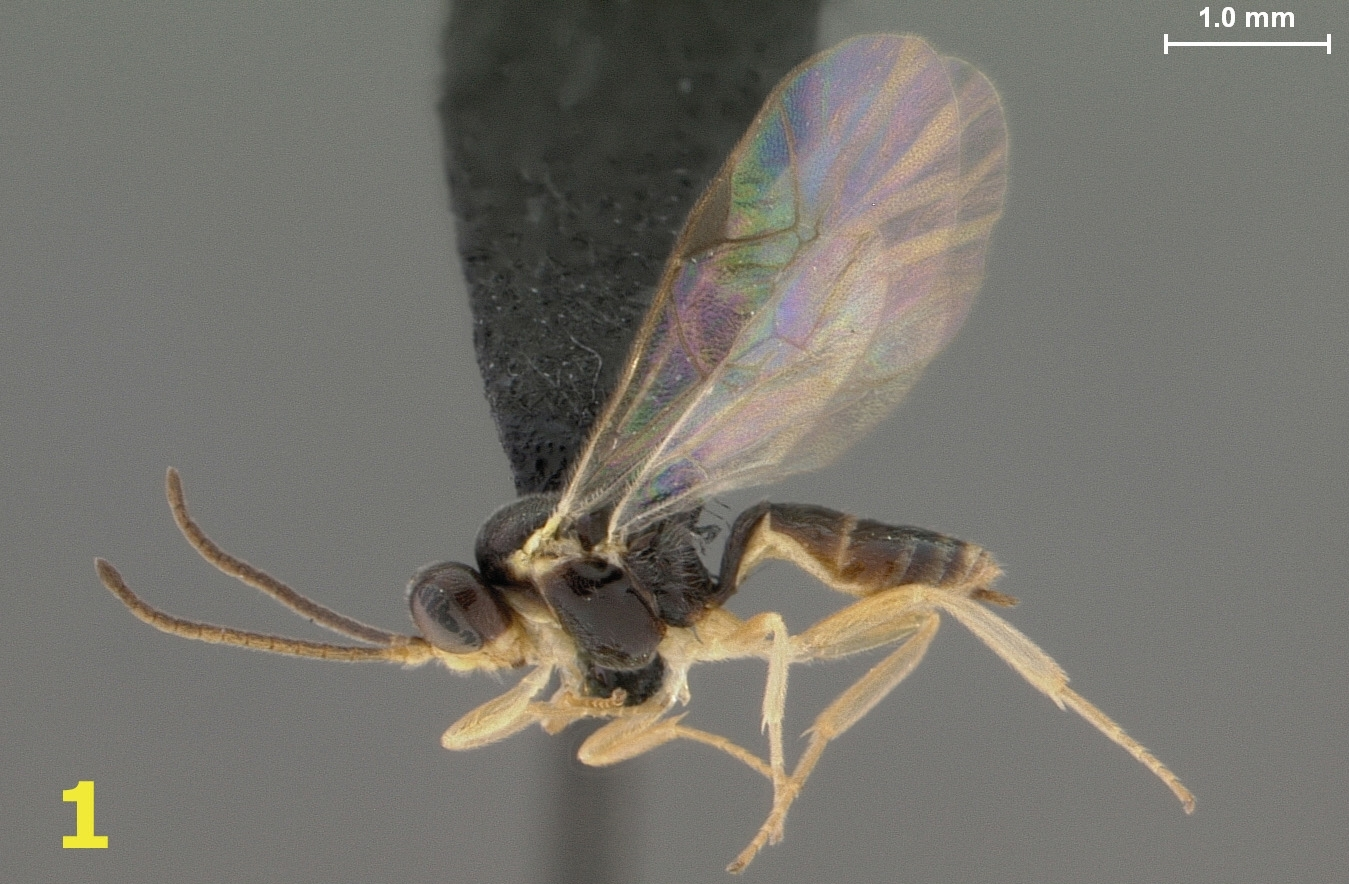
- Adelognathus leucotrochi

Scientific classification
- Kingdom: Animalia
- Phylum: Arthropoda
- Clade: Pancrustacea
- Class: Insecta
- Order: Hymenoptera
- Family: Ichneumonidae
- Subfamily: Adelognathinae; Thomson, 1888
- Genus: Adelognathus

= Adelognathus =

Genus of wasps

Adelognathinae is a subfamily of the parasitoid wasp family Ichneumonidae.

Adelognathinae are idiobiont ectoparasitoids of Symphyta larvae. Distribution is Holarctic. This subfamily contains only one genus: the type genus Adelognathus.

== Species ==
These 47 species belong to the genus Adelognathus:

- Adelognathus acantholydae Kasparyan, 1986
- Adelognathus aciculatus Thomson, 1883
- Adelognathus adventor Kasparyan, 1986
- Adelognathus americanus Cushman, 1922
- Adelognathus brevicornis Holmgren, 1857
- Adelognathus brevis Kasparyan, 1986
- Adelognathus britannicus Perkins, 1943
- Adelognathus cephalotes Kasparyan, 1999
- Adelognathus chelonus Kasparyan, 1990
- Adelognathus chrysopygus (Gravenhorst, 1829)
- Adelognathus ctenonyx Kasparyan, 1986
- Adelognathus cubiceps Roman, 1925
- Adelognathus dealbatus Kasparyan, 1990
- Adelognathus difformis Holmgren, 1857
- Adelognathus dorsalis (Gravenhorst, 1829)
- Adelognathus elongator Kasparyan, 1990
- Adelognathus eurus Kasparyan, 1990
- Adelognathus facialis Thomson, 1883
- Adelognathus flavopictus Davis, 1897
- Adelognathus formosus Kasparyan, 1990
- Adelognathus frigidus Holmgren, 1883
- Adelognathus genator Kasparyan, 1990
- Adelognathus laevicollis Thomson, 1883
- Adelognathus leucotrochi Shaw & Wahl, 2014
- Adelognathus longithorax Kasparyan, 1986
- Adelognathus maculosus Kasparyan, 1990
- Adelognathus marginellus Holmgren, 1857
- Adelognathus nigriceps Thomson, 1888
- Adelognathus nigrifrons Holmgren, 1857
- Adelognathus obscurus Kasparyan, 1986
- Adelognathus pallipes (Gravenhorst, 1829)
- Adelognathus palpalis Kasparyan, 1990
- Adelognathus pilosus Thomson, 1888
- Adelognathus pumilio Holmgren, 1857
- Adelognathus puncticollis Thomson, 1883
- Adelognathus punctulatus Thomson, 1883
- Adelognathus pusillus Holmgren, 1857
- Adelognathus rufithorax Kasparyan, 1990
- Adelognathus stelfoxi Fitton, Gauld & Shaw, 1982
- Adelognathus tenthredinarum (Giraud, 1872)
- Adelognathus tetratinctorius (Thunberg, 1822)
- Adelognathus thomsoni Schmiedeknecht, 1911
- Adelognathus trochanteratus Kasparyan, 1986
- Adelognathus tumidus Kasparyan, 1990
- Adelognathus ungularis Kasparyan, 1990
- Adelognathus ussuriensis Kasparyan, 1986
- Adelognathus xenocerus Kasparyan, 1990
