= Gavin Broad =

British Entomologist

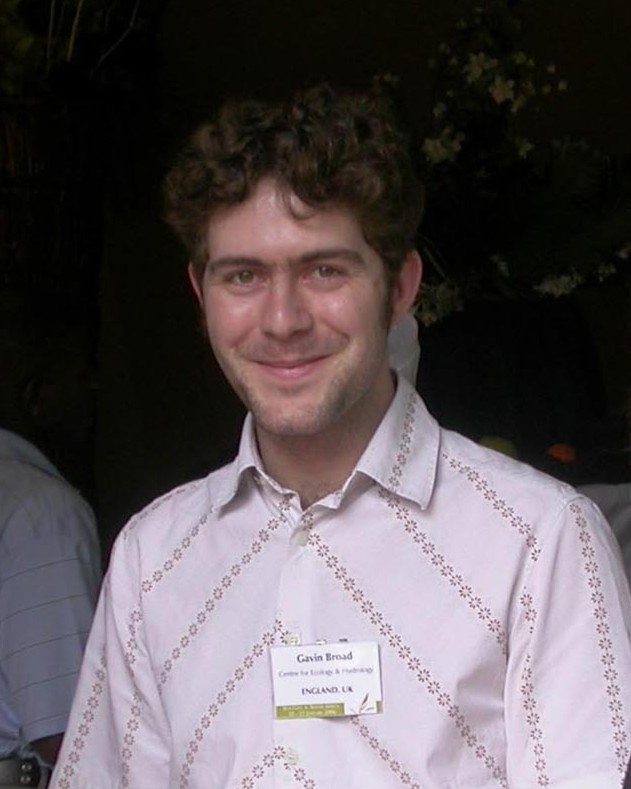
- Broad in 2006
- Born: 29 December 1975 (age 50)
- Education: Imperial College London
- Scientific career
- Fields: Entomology
- Workplaces: The Natural History Museum, London

Gavin R. Broad is a British entomologist who was the curator in charge of Insects, and is a Principal Curator of Hymenoptera at Natural History Museum, London. He is the President of the British Entomological and Natural History Society and President-Elect for the International Society of Hymenopterists. He is also the co-investigator on the Darwin Tree of Life Project. His work focuses on Ichneumonoidea and groups previously classified as Vespoidea. His research interests focus on the taxonomy and diversity of Ichneumonidae and on biodiversity genomics.

== Career ==
Broad studied his undergraduate degree in Zoology at Sheffield University, and completed his PhD at Imperial College London in 2001. He worked at the Biological Records Centre for three years as a coordinator of zoological data and research. Broad works at Natural History Museum, London as a principal curator in Hymenoptera since 2006.

Broad is known best for his work with Hymenoptera, with over 400 publications, including two books, Wasps of the World: A Guide to Every Family, co-authored with Simon Van Noort and Ichneumonid Wasps (Hymenoptera: Ichneumonidae): Their Classification and Biology.

Broad has had multiple species and genera named after him. For the 100th Birthday of David Attenborough, Broad was part of a group that named Attenboroughnculus in recognition.
