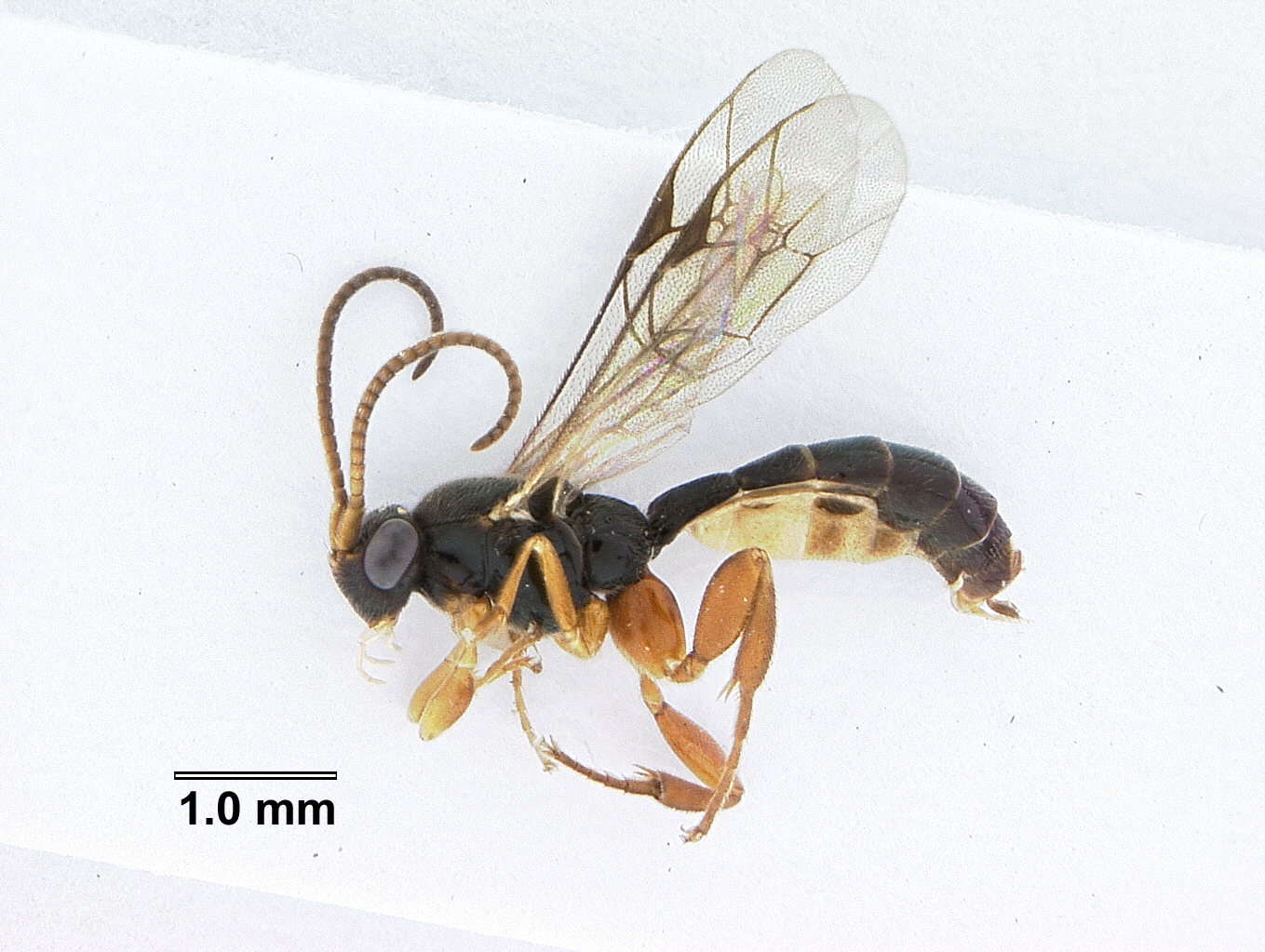
- Orthocentrus

Scientific classification
- Kingdom: Animalia
- Phylum: Arthropoda
- Clade: Pancrustacea
- Class: Insecta
- Order: Hymenoptera
- Family: Ichneumonidae
- Subfamily: Orthocentrinae

Synonyms
- Plectiscoidae Förster, 1869

= Orthocentrinae =

Subfamily of wasps

Orthocentrinae is a subfamily of ichneumonid wasps in the family Ichneumonidae. There are at least 29 genera in Orthocentrinae.

== Genera ==
These six genera belong to the subfamily Orthocentrinae:

- Aniseres Förster, 1871
- Aperileptus Förster, 1869^{c g b}
- Eusterinx Förster, 1869^{c g b}
- Neurateles Ratzeburg, 1848^{c g b}
- Orthocentrus Gravenhorst, 1829^{c g b}
- Proclitus Förster, 1869^{c g b}
- Stenomacrus Förster, 1869^{c g b}

Data sources: i = ITIS, c = Catalogue of Life, g = GBIF, b = Bugguide.net
