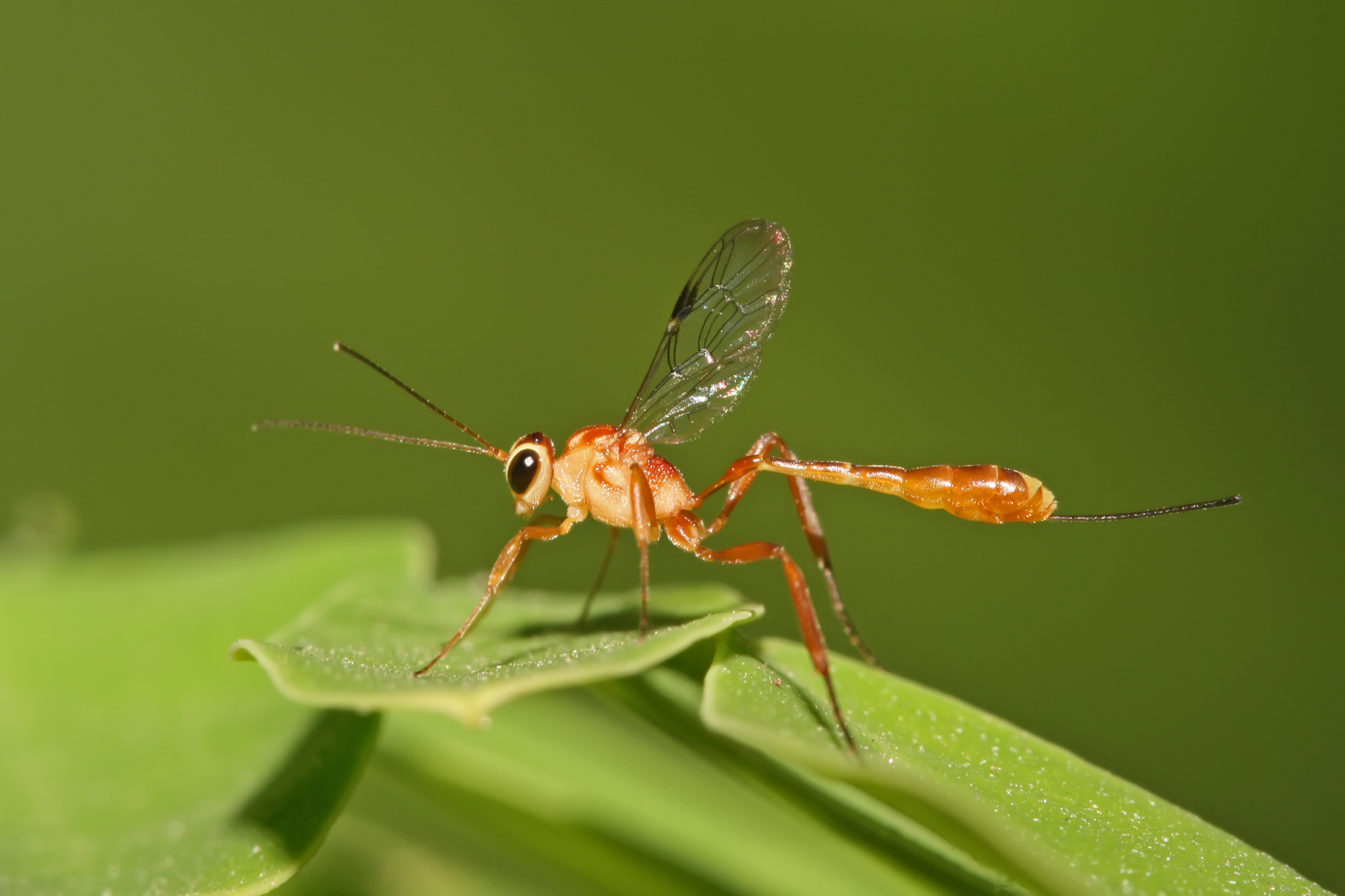
- Anomaloninae (Tanzania)

Scientific classification
- Kingdom: Animalia
- Phylum: Arthropoda
- Clade: Pancrustacea
- Class: Insecta
- Order: Hymenoptera
- Suborder: Apocrita
- Superfamily: Ichneumonoidea
- Family: Ichneumonidae; Latreille, 1802

Subfamilies
- See below

= Ichneumonidae =

Ichneumon wasps Temporal range: Early Cretaceous – Recent
- Diphyus sp., Rhône (France)

Family of wasps

The Ichneumonidae, also known as ichneumon wasps, ichneumonid wasps, ichneumonids, or Darwin wasps, are a family of parasitoid wasps of the insect order Hymenoptera. They are one of the most diverse groups within the Hymenoptera with roughly 25,000 species described as of 2016. However, this likely represents less than a quarter of their true richness as reliable estimates are lacking, along with much of the most basic knowledge about their ecology, distribution, and evolution. It is estimated that there are more species in this family than there are species of birds and mammals combined. Ichneumonid wasps, with very few exceptions, attack the immature stages of holometabolous insects and spiders, eventually killing their hosts. They play an important role as regulators of insect populations, both in natural and semi-natural systems, making them promising agents for biological control.

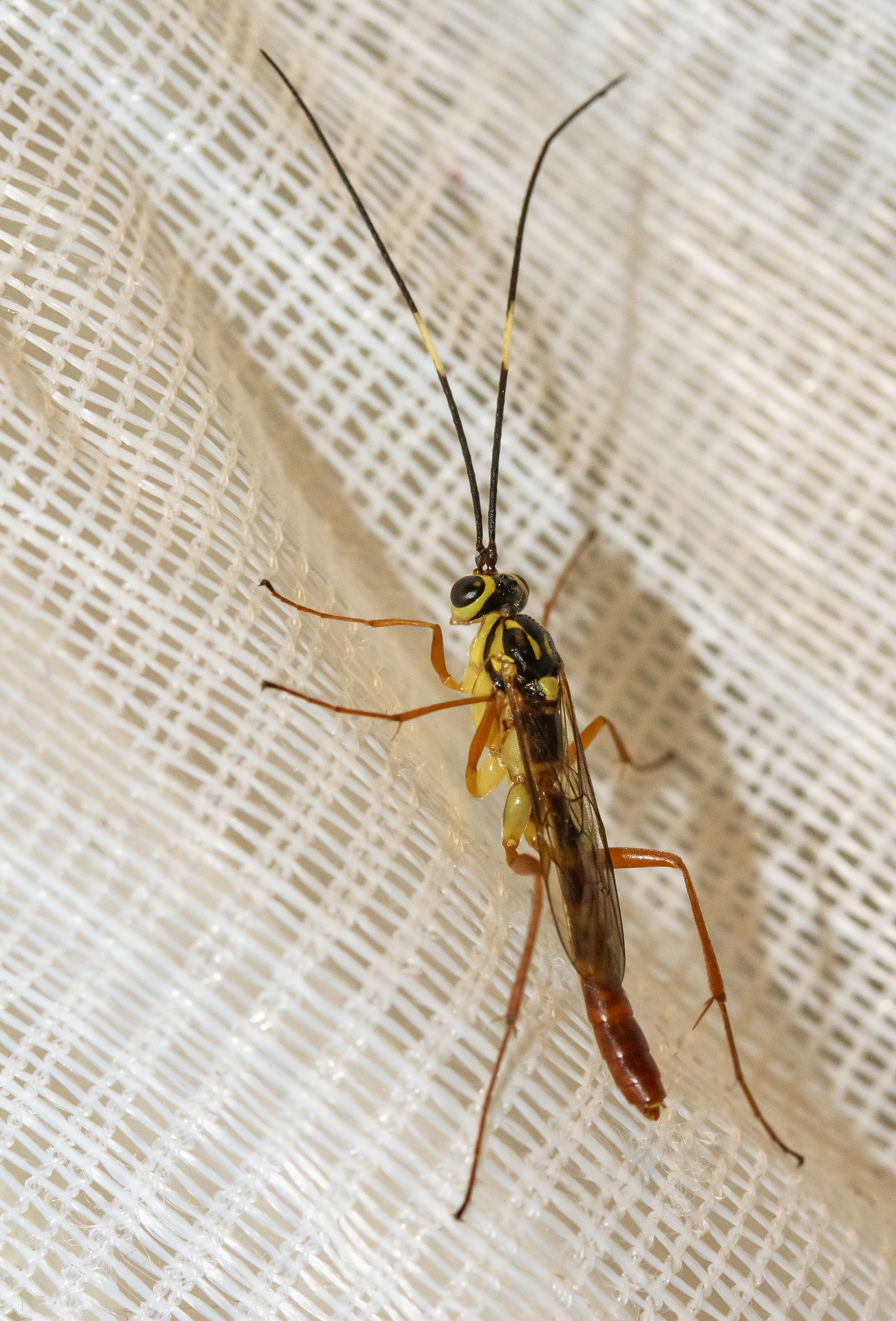
Male ichneumonid wasp

The distribution of the ichneumonids was traditionally considered an exception to the common latitudinal gradient in species diversity, since the family was thought to be at its most species-rich in the temperate zone instead of the tropics, but numerous new tropical species have now been discovered.

== Etymology and history ==
Insects in the family Ichneumonidae are commonly called ichneumon wasps, or ichneumonids. However, the term ichneumon wasps can refer specifically to the genus Ichneumon within the Ichneumonidae and thus can cause confusion. A group of ichneumonid specialists have proposed Darwin wasps as a better vernacular name for the family. Less exact terms are ichneumon flies (they are not closely related to true flies) and scorpion wasps due to the extreme lengthening and curving of the abdomen (scorpions are arachnids, not insects).

The name is derived from Latin 'ichneumon', from Ancient Greek ἰχνεύμων (ikhneúmōn, "tracker"), from ἴχνος (íkhnos, "track, footstep"). The name first appeared in Aristotle's "History of Animals", c. 343 BC. Aristotle noted that the ichneumon is a wasp smaller than ordinary wasps, preys upon spiders, carries its prey to a hole in which it lays its larvae, and seals the hole with mud. Aristotle's writing, however, more accurately describes the mud daubers than the true ichneumon wasps, which do not construct mud nests.

== Description ==
Adult ichneumonids superficially resemble other wasps. They have a slender waist, two pairs of wings, a pair of large compound eyes on the side of the head and three ocelli on top of the head. Their size varies considerably from a few millimetres to seven or more centimetres.

The ichneumonids have more antennal segments than typical, aculeate wasps (Aculeata: Vespoidea and Apoidea): ichneumonids typically possess 16 or more, while most other wasps have 13 or fewer. Unlike aculeate wasps, which have an ovipositor modified for prey capture and defense, and do not pass their eggs along the stinger, ichneumonid females have an unmodified ovipositor which they use to lay eggs inside or on their host. Ichneumonids generally inject venom along with the egg, but only larger species (some in the genera Netelia and Ophion) with relatively short ovipositors use the ovipositor in defense. Males do not possess stingers or ovipositors in either lineage.

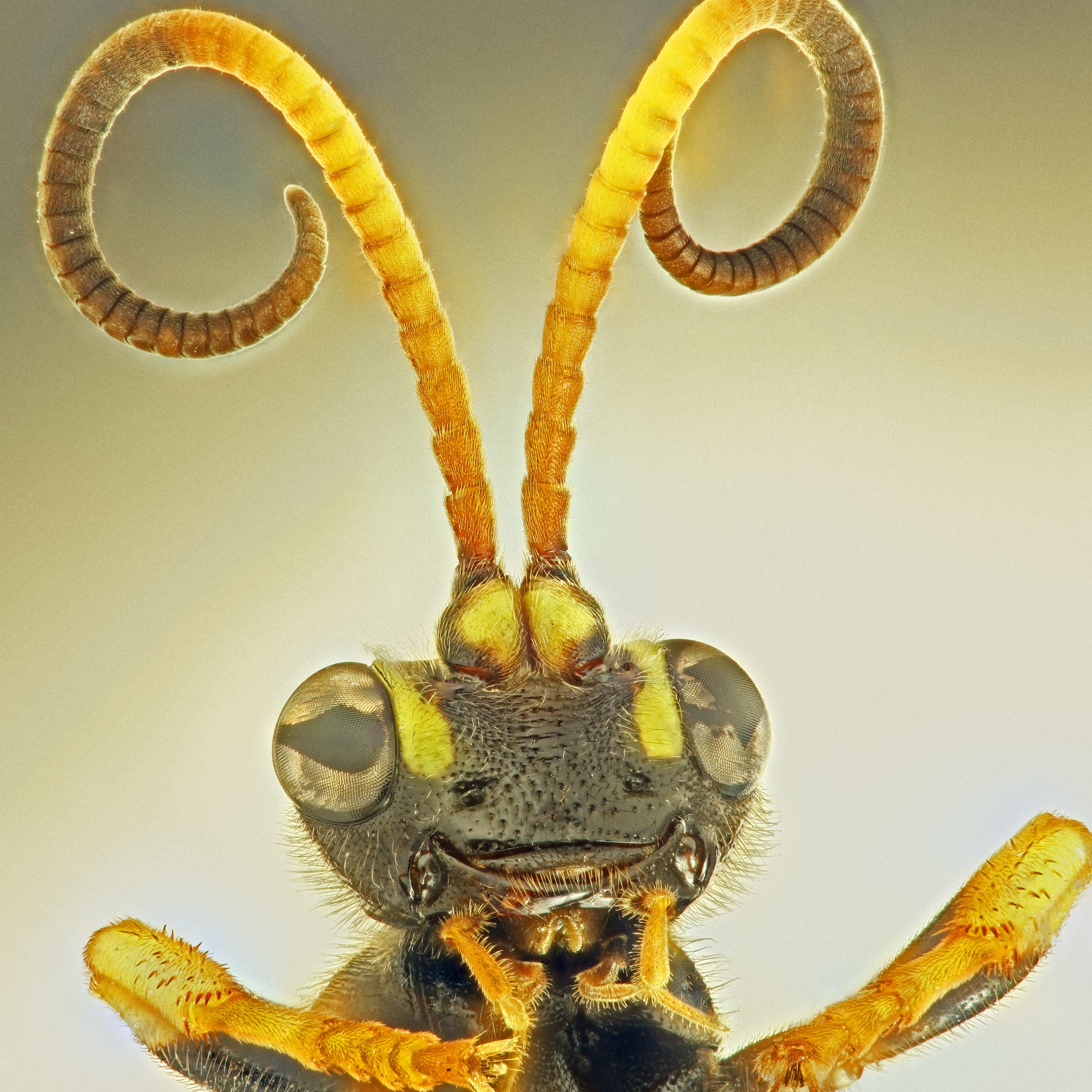
Head (Ichneumon xanthorius). Antennae with many segments

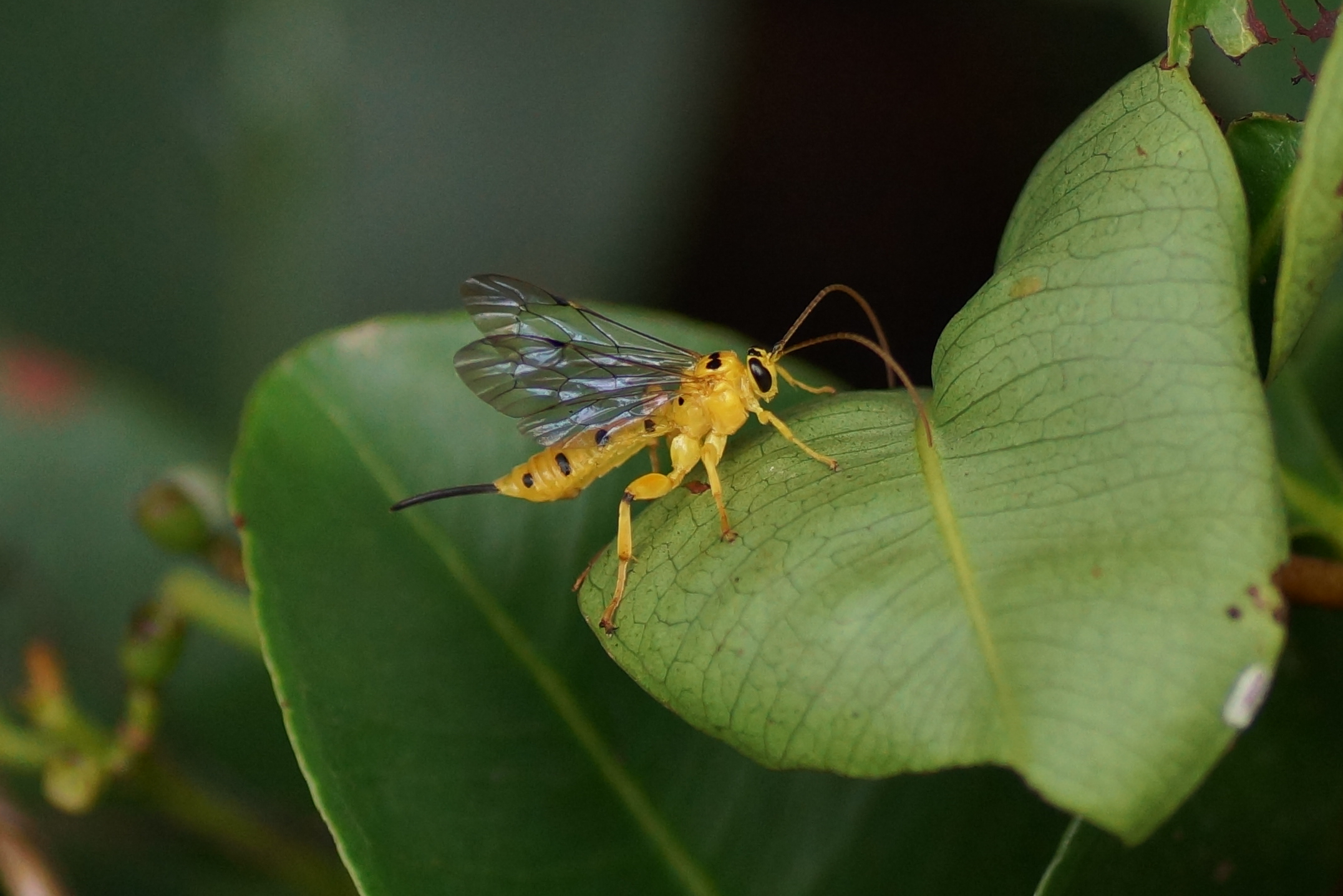
Female Xanthopimpla punctata. Ovipositor longer and more slender than stingers of aculeate wasps

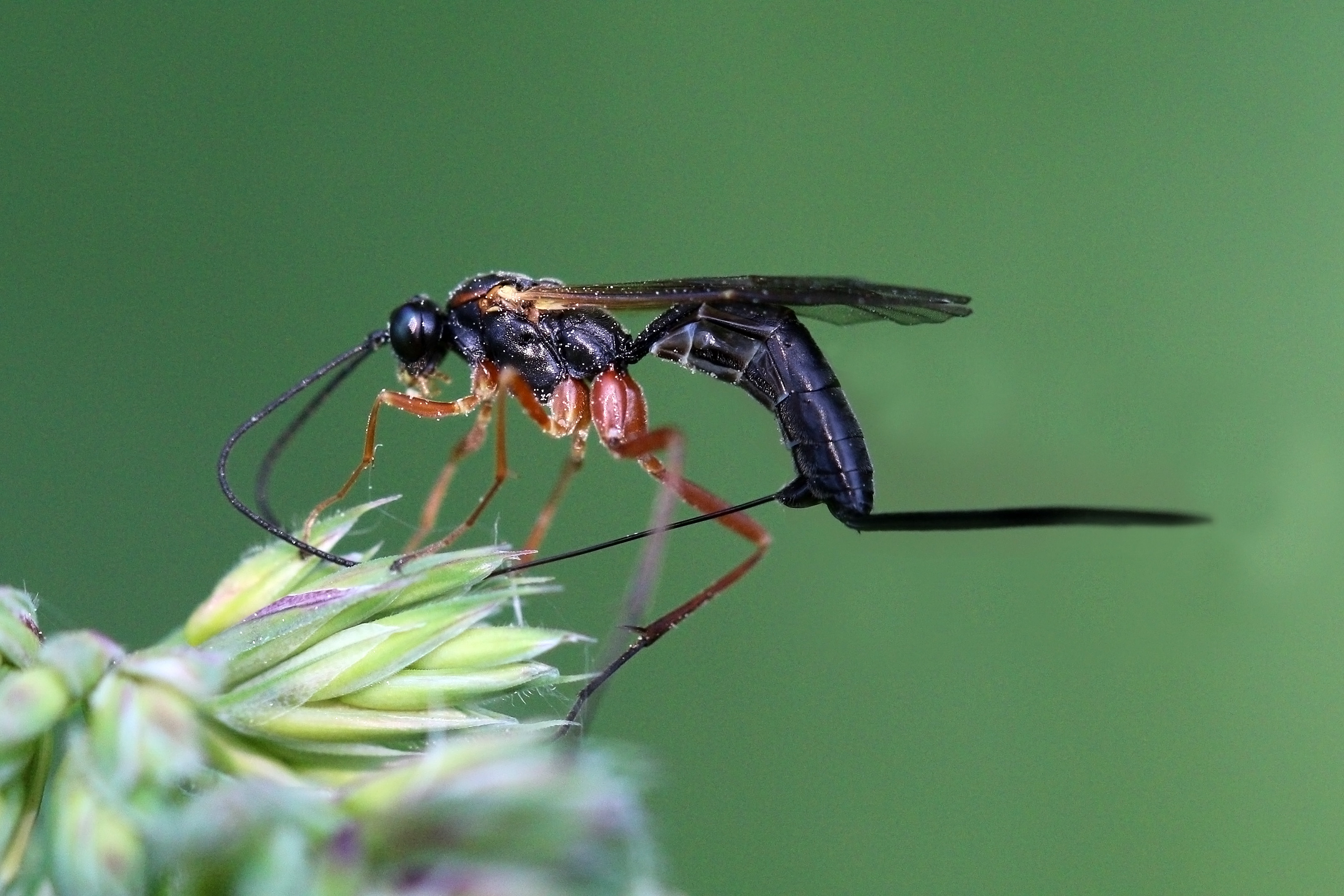
Lissonota sp., female
Oxfordshire

Ichneumonids are distinguished from their sister group Braconidae mainly on the basis of wing venation. The fore wing of 95% of ichneumonids has vein 2m-cu (in the Comstock–Needham system), which is absent in braconids. Vein 1rs-m of the fore wing is absent in all ichneumonids, but is present in 85% of braconids. In the hind wing of ichneumonids, vein rs-m joins Rs apical to (or rarely opposite) the split between veins Rs and R1. In braconids, vein rs-m joins basal to this split. The taxa also differ in the structure of the metasoma: about 90% of ichneumonids have a flexible suture between tergites 2 and 3, whereas these tergites are fused in braconids (though the suture is secondarily flexible in Aphidiinae).

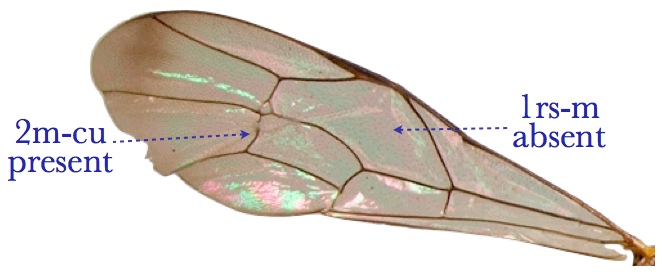
Ichneumonid fore wing (Syzecteus sp.). The presence of vein 2m-cu and absence of vein 1Rs+M distinguish the wing from that of braconids.

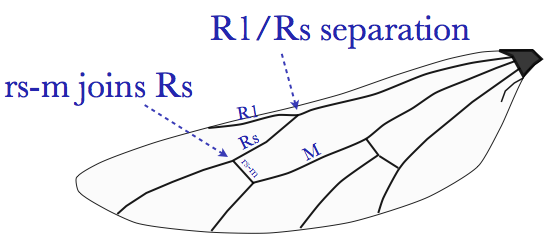
Ichneumonid hind wing. Vein rs-m joins Rs after the split between veins Rs and R1.

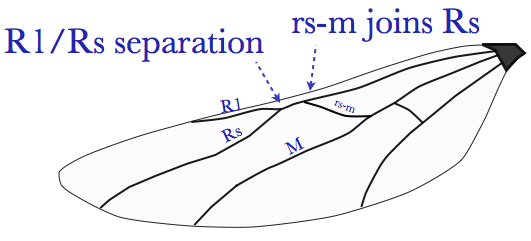
Braconid hind wing. Vein rs-m joins Rs before the split between veins Rs and R1.

== Distribution ==
Ichneumonids are found on all continents with the exception of Antarctica. They inhabit virtually all terrestrial habitats, wherever there are suitable invertebrate hosts.

The distribution of ichneumonid species richness is subject to ongoing debate. Long believed to be rare in the tropics, and at its most species rich in the temperate region, the family became a classic textbook example of an 'exceptional' latitudinal diversity gradient. Recently this belief has been questioned, after the discovery of numerous new tropical species.

== Reproduction and diet ==
A very few ichneumonid species lay their eggs in the ground, but the vast majority inject eggs either directly into their host's body or onto its surface, and this may require penetration of substrate around the host, as in wood-boring host larvae that live deep inside of tree trunks, requiring the ichneumon to drill its ovipositor through several centimeters of solid wood (e.g., Megarhyssa species). After hatching, the ichneumonid larva consumes its still living host. The most common hosts are larvae or pupae of Lepidoptera, Coleoptera and Hymenoptera. Some species in the subfamily Pimplinae also parasitise spiders. Hyperparasitoids such as Mesochorinae oviposit inside the larvae of other ichneumonoids. The hosts of some species are agricultural pests, therefore ichneumons are sometimes valuable for biological pest control, but the hosts of most species are unknown; host information has been reviewed and summarized by various researchers, e.g. Aubert, Perkins. and Townes.

Ichneumonids use both idiobiont and koinobiont strategies. Idiobionts paralyze their host and prevent it from moving or growing. Koinobionts allow their host to continue to grow and develop. In both strategies, the host typically dies after some weeks, after which the ichneumonid larva emerges and pupates.

Adult ichneumonids feed on a diversity of foods, including plant sap and nectar; females of some species also feed on their hosts by sipping body fluids released during oviposition, or even stabbing host and non-host insects to imbibe their body fluids. They spend much of their active time searching, either for hosts (female ichneumonids) or for emerging females (male ichneumonids). The parasitism pressure exerted by ichneumonids can be tremendous, and they are often one of the major regulators of invertebrate populations. It is quite common for 10-20% or more of a host's population to be parasitised (though reported parasitism rates often include non-ichneumonid parasitoids).

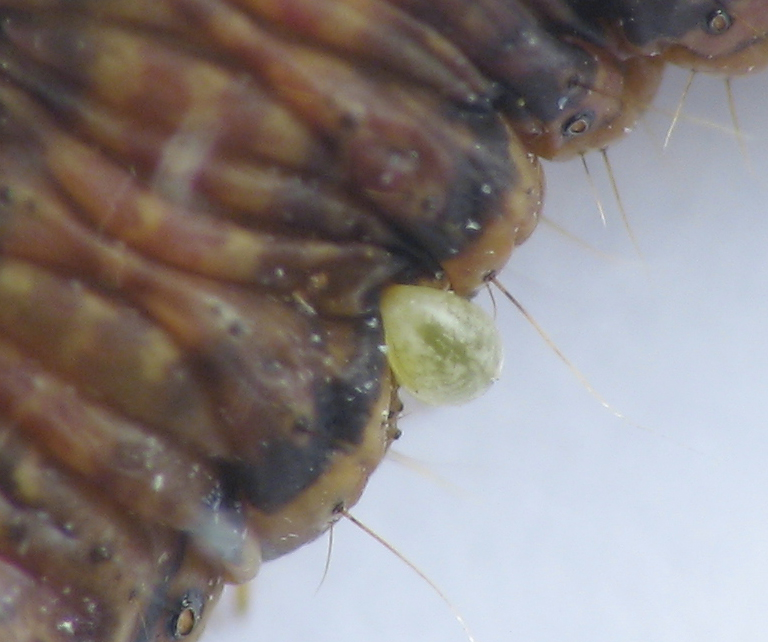
Phytodietus, egg on Pococera caterpillar

Zatypota albicoxa laying egg on a spider

Itoplectis maculator laying eggs in moth cocoons

Rhyssa persuasoria laying eggs in dead wood, parasitising larvae of beetles or sawflies

Therion circumflexum drinking from damaged edge of leaf

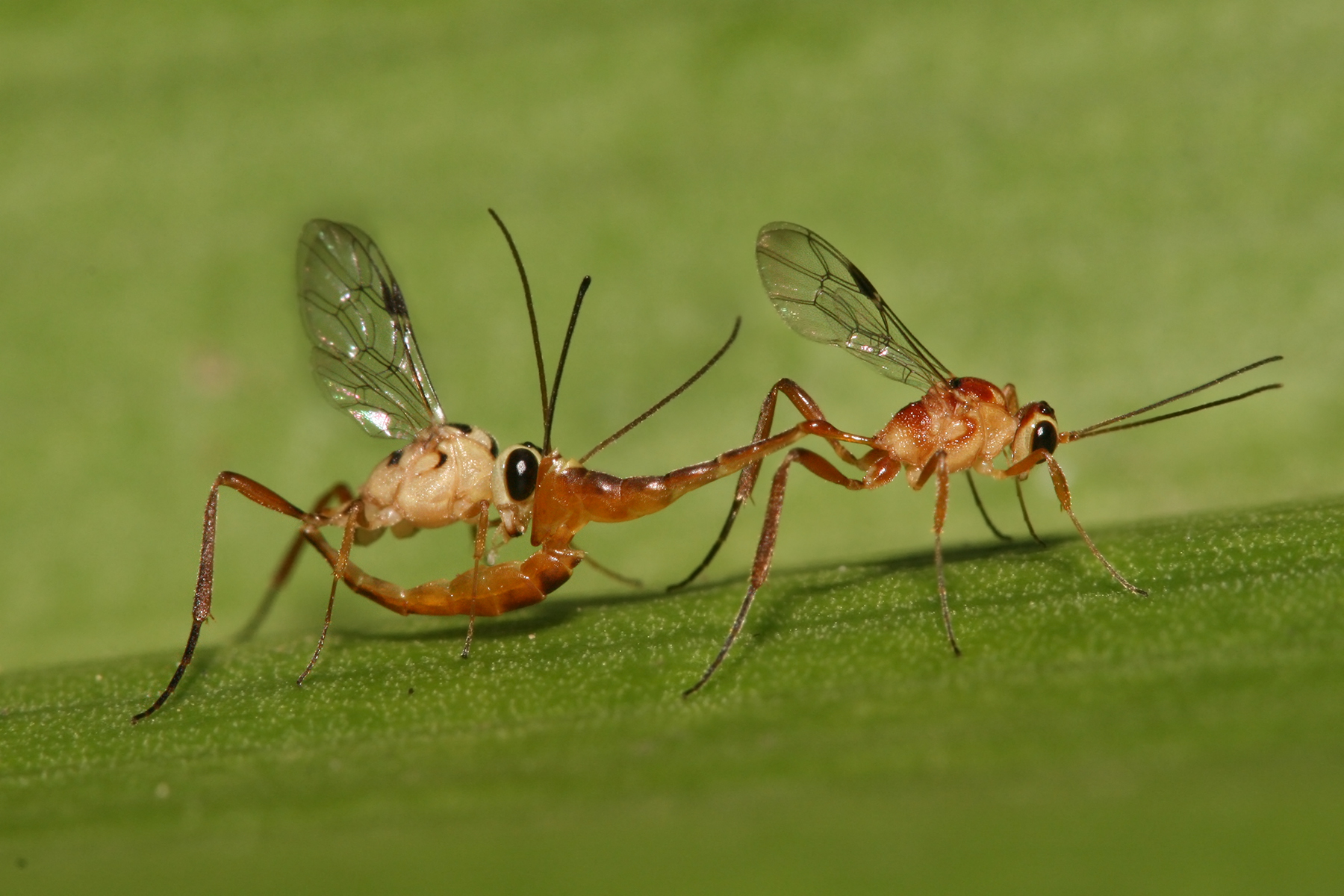
Mating ichneumonids

Larva of Acrodactyla quadrisculpta parasitising spider

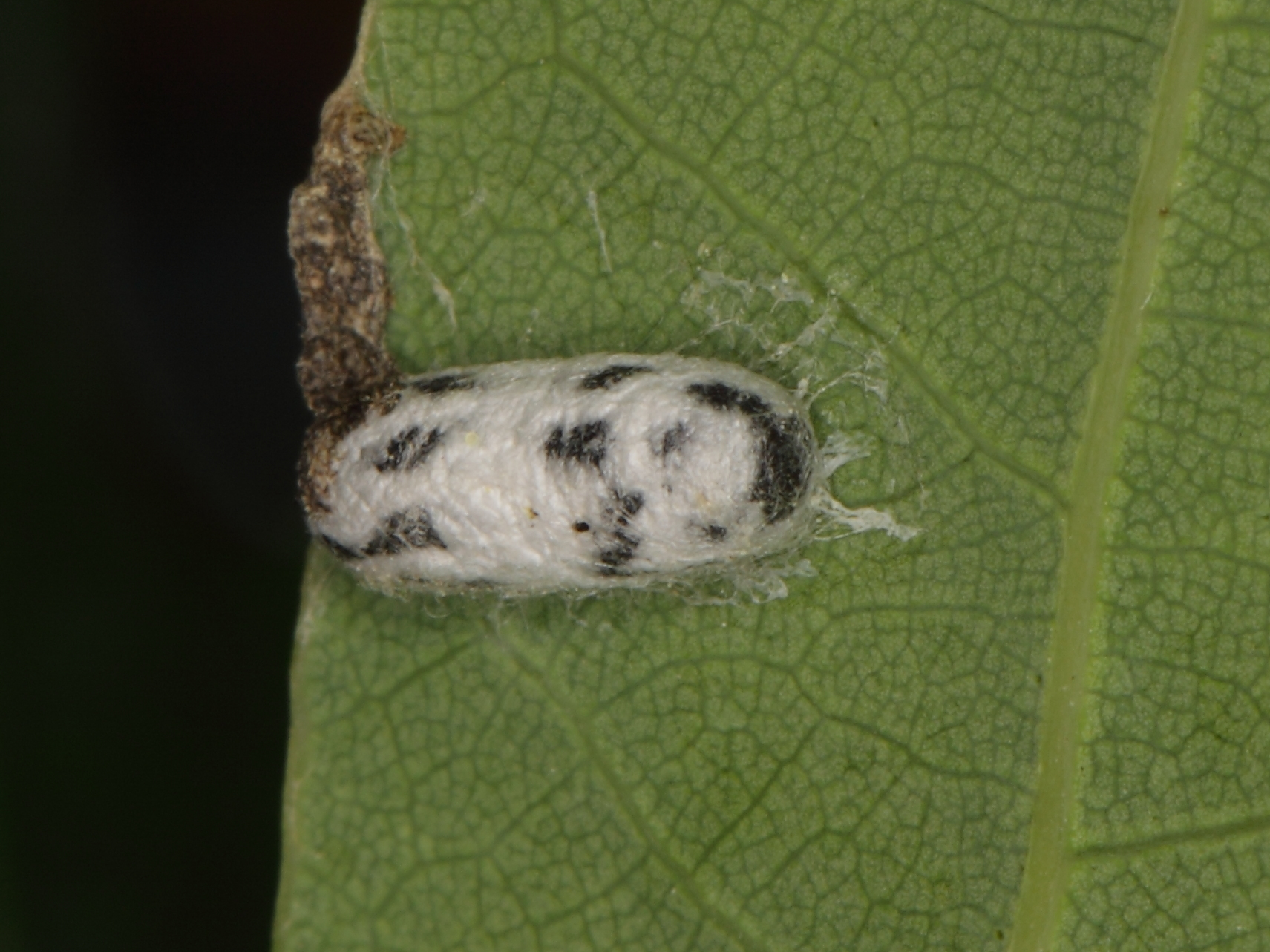
Campoplegine pupa, with empty skin of caterpillar it parasitised above it

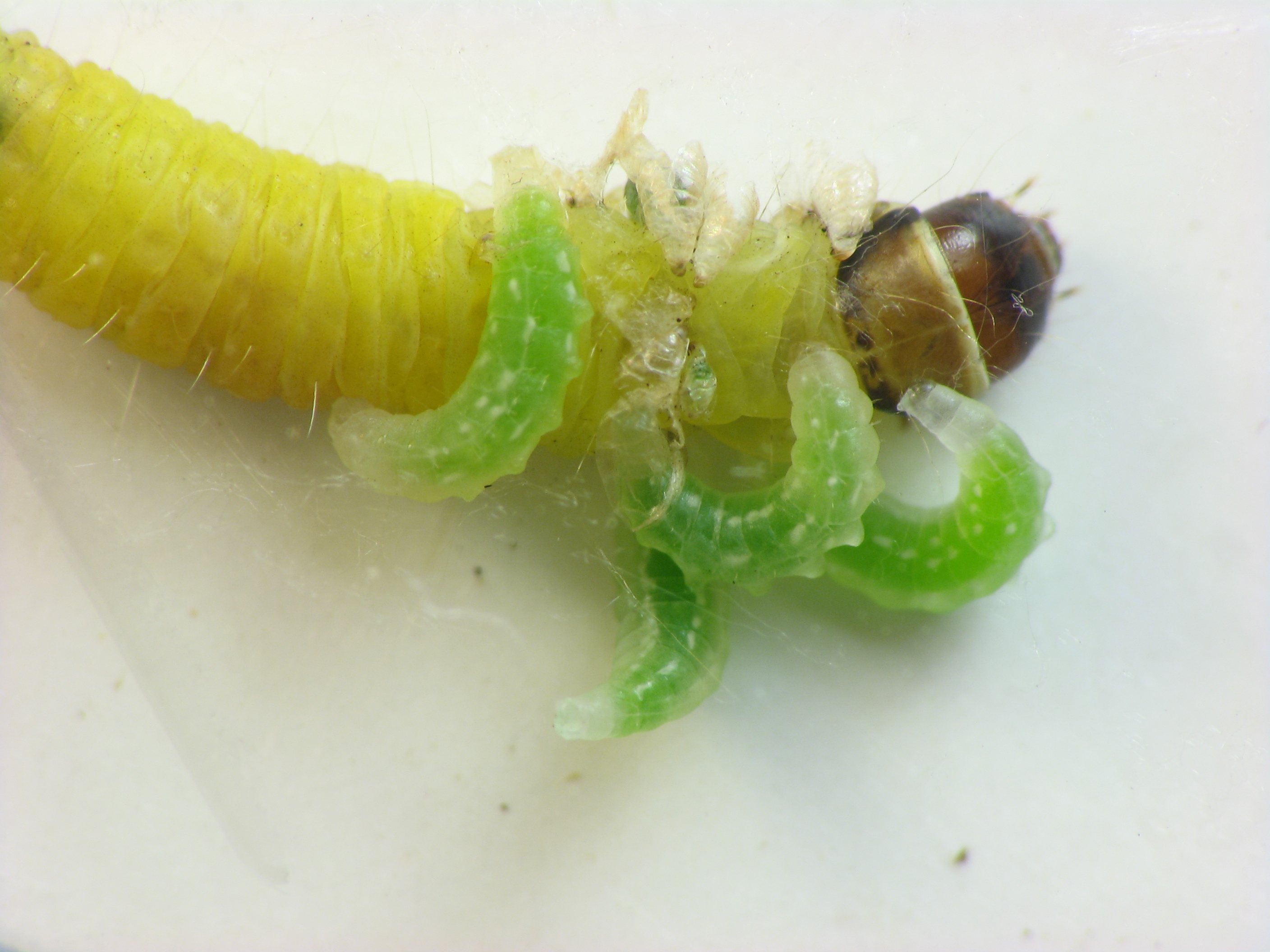
Hercus fontinalis larvae feeding on caterpillar

== Taxonomy and systematics ==
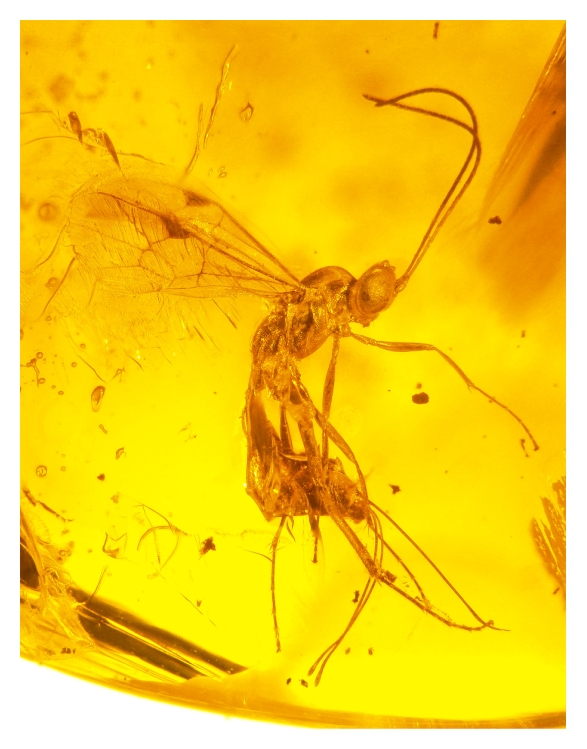
An ichneumonid caught in amber 15-20 million years ago.

The taxonomy of the ichneumonids is still poorly known. The family is highly diverse, containing 24,000 described species. Approximately 60,000 species are estimated to exist worldwide, though some estimates place this number at over 100,000. They are severely undersampled, and studies of their diversity typically produce very high numbers of species which are represented by only a single individual. Due to the high diversity, the existence of numerous small and hard to identify species, and the majority of species being undiscovered, it has proven difficult to resolve the phylogeny of the ichneumonids. Even the relationships between subfamilies are unclear. The sheer diversity also means DNA sequence data is only available for a tiny fraction of the species, and detailed cladistic studies require major computing capacity.

Extensive catalogues of the ichneumonids include those by Aubert, Gauld, Perkins, and Townes. Due to the taxonomic difficulties involved, however, their classifications and terminology are often confusingly contradictory. Several prominent authors have gone as far as to publish major reviews that defy the International Code of Zoological Nomenclature.

The large number of species in Ichneumonidae may be due to the evolution of parasitoidism in Hymenoptera, which occurred approximately 247 million years ago. Ichneumonidae is the basal branch of Apocrita, which together with Orussoidea makes up the lineage in which parasitoidism in Hymenoptera evolved, and some ichneumonids are thought to have been in stasis for millions of years and closely resemble the common ancestor in which parasitoidism evolved. This common ancestor was likely an Ectoparasitoid woodwasp that parasitized wood-boring beetle larvae in trees. However, this has been disputed as early fossil ichneumonoids (such as Praeichneumonidae, Tanychorinae, Eoichneumoninae, and Protorhyssalinae) have ovipositors that are only a few millimeters long. Therefore, it has been proposed that they make unlikely candidates for parasitoids of wood-boring hosts. The family has existed since at least the Early Cretaceous (c. 125 mya), but probably appeared already in the Jurassic (c. 181 mya), soon after the appearance of its major host groups. It diversified during the Oligocene.

=== Subfamilies ===
In 1999, the extant ichneumonids were divided into 39 subfamilies, whose names and definitions have varied considerably. In 2019, combined morphological and molecular phylogenetic analysis of the family resulted in the following 41 subfamilies being recognized, in addition to the extinct Labenopimplinae.

- Acaenitinae Townes, 1950
- Adelognathinae Thomson, 1888
- Agriotypinae Haliday,1838
- Anomaloninae Viereck, 1918 (= Anomalinae)
- Ateleutinae Townes, 1970 (previously part of Cryptinae)
- Banchinae Townes, 1951
- Brachycyrtinae Viereck, 1919 (previously part of Phrudinae)
- Campopleginae Förster, 1869 (= Porizontinae)
- Claseinae Porter, 1998
- Collyriinae Cushman, 1924
- Cremastinae Förster, 1869
- Cryptinae Kirby, 1837 (= Gelinae, Hemitelinae, Phygadeuontinae)
- Ctenopelmatinae Förster, 1869 (= Scolobatinae)
- Cylloceriinae Wahl, 1990 (sometimes included in Microleptinae)
- Diacritinae Townes, 1965 (sometimes included in Pimplinae)
- Diplazontinae Viereck, 1918
- Eucerotinae Seyrig, 1934 (sometimes included in Tryphoninae)
- Hybrizontinae (= Paxylommatinae) (sometimes placed in own family)
- Ichneumoninae Latreille, 1802 (includes Alomyini)
- Labeninae Ashmead,1900 (= Labiinae)
- Labenopimplinae (extinct)
- Lycorininae (sometimes included in Banchinae)
- Mesochorinae Forster, 1869
- Metopiinae Forster, 1869
- Microleptinae Townes, 1958
- Neorhacodinae (sometimes included in Banchinae)
- Nesomesochorinae Ashmead, 1905
- Ophioninae Shuckard, 1840
- Orthocentrinae Förster, 1869 (sometimes included in Microleptinae)
- Orthopelmatinae Schmiedeknecht, 1910
- Oxytorinae Thomson, 1883
- Pedunculinae Porter, 1998
- Phygadeuontinae (previously part of Cryptinae)
- Pimplinae Wesmael, 1845 (= Ephialtinae)
- Poemeniinae Smith & Shenefelt, 1955 (sometimes included in Pimplinae)
- Rhyssinae Morley, 1913 (sometimes included in Pimplinae)
- Sisyrostolinae (sometimes included in Phrudinae)
- Stilbopinae Townes & Townes, 1949 (excluding Notostilbops)
- Tatogastrinae Wahl, 1990 (sometimes included in Microleptinae)
- Tersilochinae Schmiedeknecht, 1910 (includes Neorhacodinae and part of Phrudinae)
- Tryphoninae Shuckard, 1840
- Xoridinae Shuckard, 1840

== Famous ichneumonologists ==
Famous ichneumonologists include:

- Jacques Aubert
- Carl Gustav Alexander Brischke
- Peter Cameron
- Arnold Förster
- Johann Ludwig Christian Gravenhorst
- Alexander Henry Haliday
- Gerd Heinrich
- August Emil Holmgren
- Joseph Kriechbaumer
- Thomas Ansell Marshall
- Henry Keith Townes
- Constantin Wesmael

== Darwin and the Ichneumonidae ==
The perceived cruelty of the ichneumonids troubled philosophers, naturalists, and theologians in the 19th century, who found the parasitoid life cycle inconsistent with the notion of a world created by a loving and benevolent God. Charles Darwin found the example of the Ichneumonidae so troubling that it contributed to his increasing doubts about the nature and existence of a Creator. In an 1860 letter to the American naturalist Asa Gray, Darwin wrote:

I own that I cannot see as plainly as others do, and as I should wish to do, evidence of design and beneficence on all sides of us. There seems to me too much misery in the world. I cannot persuade myself that a beneficent and omnipotent God would have designedly created the Ichneumonidae with the express intention of their feeding within the living bodies of Caterpillars, or that a cat should play with mice.

== Morphology ==
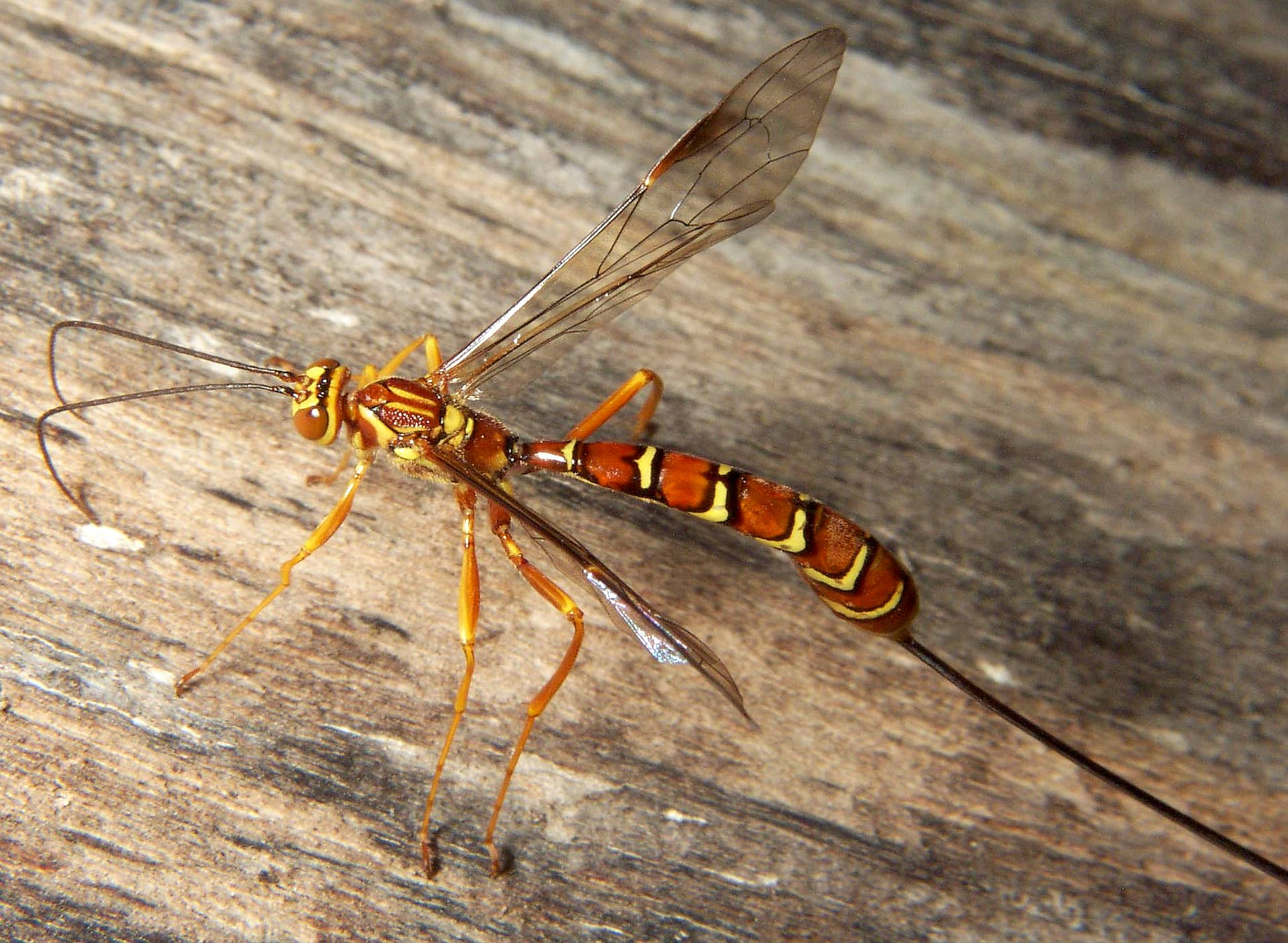
Megarhyssa greenei female

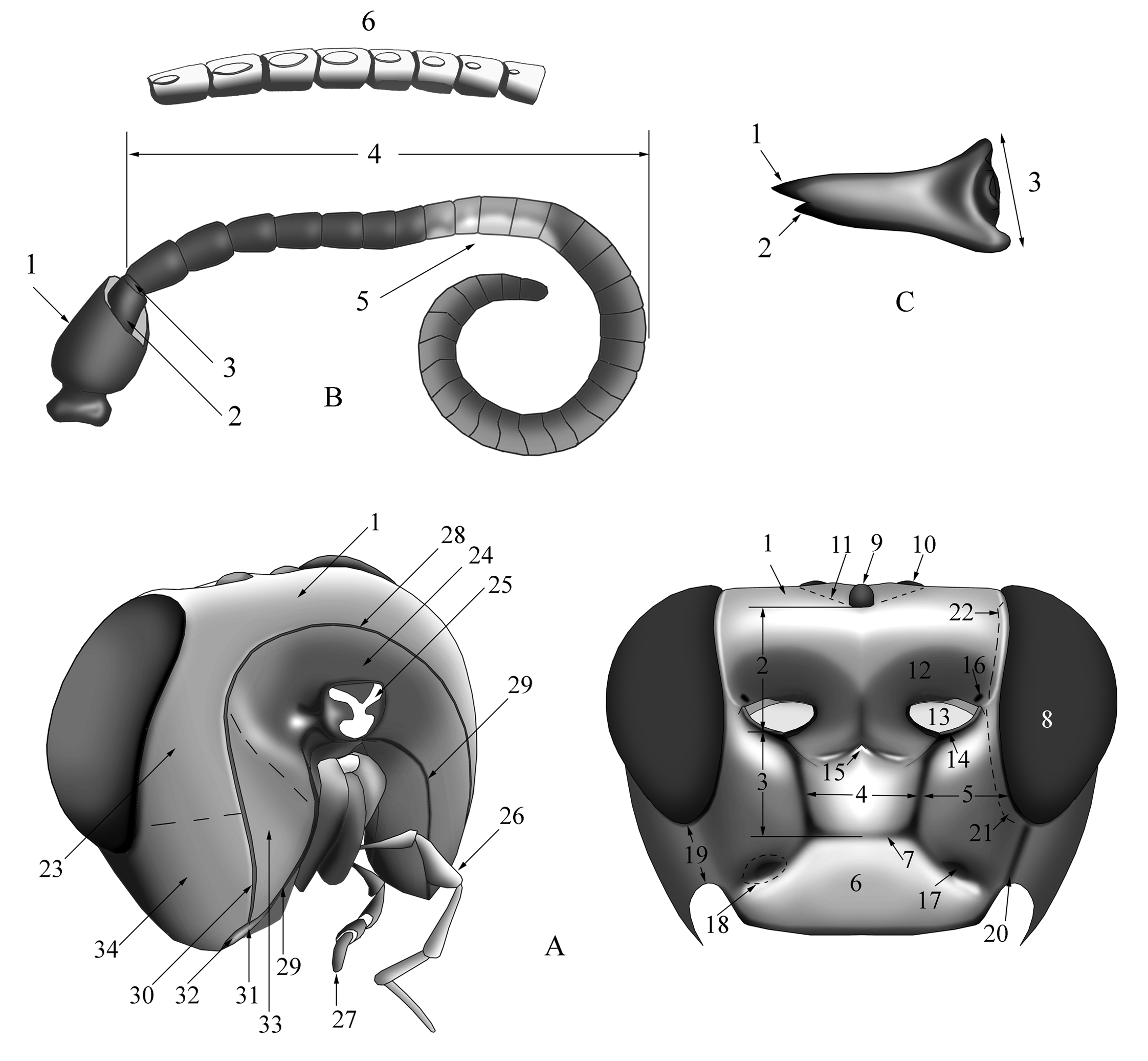
Morphology of the head and its processes: (А) head capsule; (В) antenna; (С) mandible

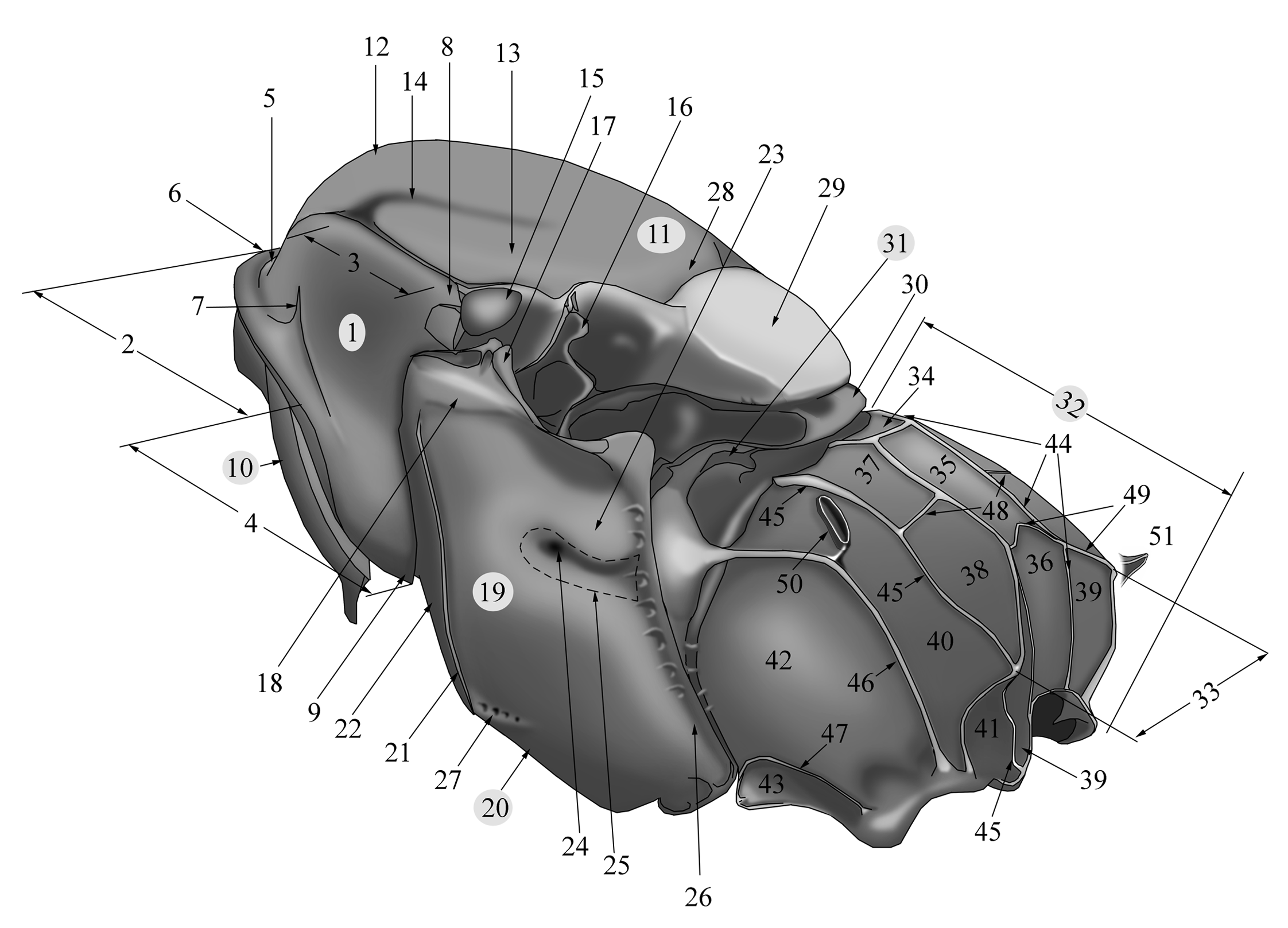
Morphology of the thorax (D)

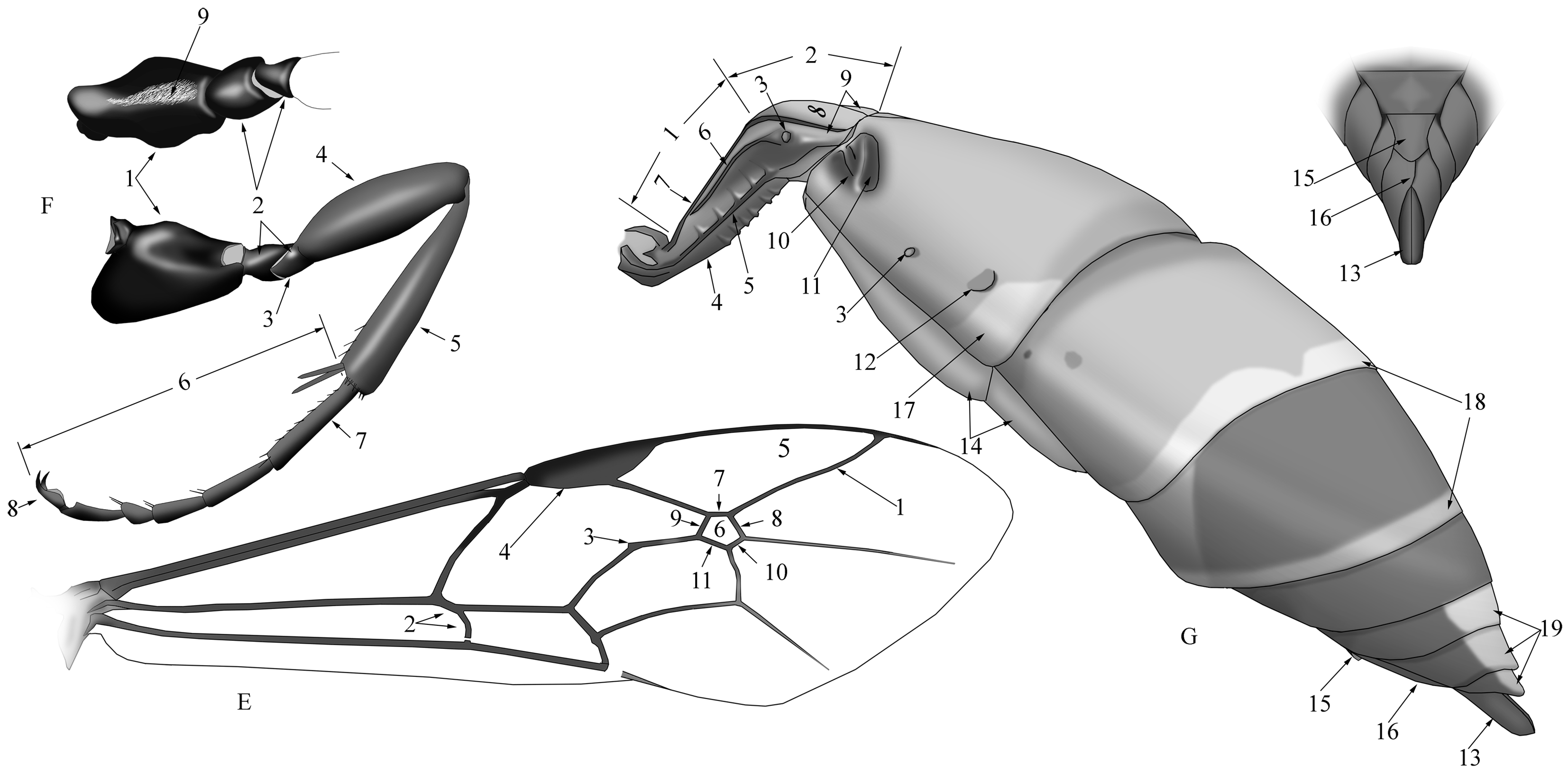
Morphology of the abdomen and processes of the thorax: (E) front wing; (F) leg III; (G) abdomen of female

== See also ==
- Checklist of UK recorded Ichneumonidae
