= 2022 in paleoentomology =

This paleoentomology list records new fossil insect taxa that were described during the year 2022, as well as notes other significant paleoentomology discoveries and events which occurred during that year.

== Clade Amphiesmenoptera ==
=== Lepidoptera ===
==== New taxa ====
Name	Novelty	Status	Authors	Age	Type locality	Location	Notes	Images
Acanthocorona hedida	Sp. nov	Valid	Zhang, Shih & Engel in Zhang et al.	Cretaceous	Burmese amber	Myanmar	A moth belonging to the family Lophocoronidae.	
Acanthocorona venulosa	Sp. nov	Valid	Zhang, Shih & Engel in Zhang et al.	Cretaceous	Burmese amber	Myanmar	A moth belonging to the family Lophocoronidae.	
Dolichoneura jorelisae	Sp. nov		Sarto i Monteys, Hausmann, Baixeras & Peñalver in Sarto i Monteys et al.	Miocene	Dominican amber	Dominican Republic	A species of Dolichoneura.	

==== Lepidopteran research ====
- A description of new specimens of caterpillars from the Cretaceous Burmese amber, expanding the morphological diversity of Cretaceous caterpillars, is published by Gauweiler et al. (2022), who also attempt to determine whether Cretaceous caterpillars might have represented an adequate food source for early birds.
- Review of the fossil record of caterpillars in Dominican and Mexican amber, including description of new specimens, is published by Haug et al. (2022).

=== Tarachoptera ===
Name	Novelty	Status	Authors	Age	Type locality	Location	Notes	Images
Kinitocelis dashengi	Sp. nov	Valid	Wang, Engel, Shih & Ren in Wang et al.	Cretaceous	Burmese amber	Myanmar		

=== Trichoptera ===
Name	Novelty	Status	Authors	Age	Type locality	Location	Notes	Images
Amberclipsis	Gen. et 3 sp. nov	Valid	Wichard, Müller & Fischer	Cretaceous	Burmese amber	Myanmar	A member of Annulipalpia related to the genus Pseudoneureclipsis. The type species is A. elegans; genus also includes new species A. oblongus and A. simplex.	
Aniburia	Gen. et sp. nov	Valid	Sukatsheva & Aristov	Early Cretaceous (Aptian)	Zaza Formation	Russia	A member of the family Calamoceratidae. Genus includes new species A. hirta.	
Archaeopolycentra longesilentia	Sp. nov	Valid	Melnitsky & Ivanov	Late Cretaceous (Cenomanian)	Dolgan Formation (Taymyr amber)	Russia (Krasnoyarsk Krai)	A member of the family Polycentropodidae.	
Baissoferus elegans	Sp. nov	Valid	Sukatsheva & Aristov	Early Cretaceous (Aptian)	Zaza Formation	Russia	A member of the family Baissoferidae.	
Cretapsyche kachini	Sp. nov	Valid	Wichard & Espeland	Cretaceous	Burmese amber	Myanmar	A member of Integripalpia belonging to the family Cretapsychidae.	
Cretapsyche myanmari	Sp. nov	Valid	Wichard & Espeland	Cretaceous	Burmese amber	Myanmar	A member of Integripalpia belonging to the family Cretapsychidae.	
Juraphilopotamus heteroclitus	Sp. nov	Valid	Sukatsheva & Aristov	Early Cretaceous (Aptian)	Zaza Formation	Russia	A member of the family Philopotamidae.	
Khutelia	Gen. et sp. nov	Valid	Sukatsheva & Sinitshenkova	Early Cretaceous	Tsagaantsav Formation	Mongolia	A member of the family Baissoferidae. The type species is K. jarzembowskii.	
Lepidochlamus	Fam. et gen. et sp. nov	Valid	Wang et al.	Cretaceous	Burmese amber	Myanmar	The type genus of the new family Lepidochlamidae. The type species is L. nodosa.	
Neureclipsis acuta	Sp. nov	Valid	Wichard & Xu	Cretaceous	Burmese amber	Myanmar	A species of Neureclipsis.	
Neureclipsis obtusa	Sp. nov	Valid	Wichard & Xu	Cretaceous	Burmese amber	Myanmar	A species of Neureclipsis.	
Neureclipsis triangula	Sp. nov	Valid	Wichard & Xu	Cretaceous	Burmese amber	Myanmar	A species of Neureclipsis.	
Palleptocerus grimaldii	Sp. nov	Valid	Wichard & Müller	Cretaceous	Burmese amber	Myanmar	A member of Leptoceroidea belonging to the family Palleptoceridae.	
Pardoferus	Gen. et sp. et comb. nov	Valid	Sukatsheva & Aristov	Early Cretaceous (Aptian)	Zaza Formation	Russia	A member of the family Baissoferidae. Genus includes new species P. vitimicus, as well as "Baissoferus" sinitsae Sukatsheva & Vassilenko (2013).	
Plectrocnemia bowangi	Sp. nov	Valid	Wichard & Xu	Cretaceous	Burmese amber	Myanmar	A species of Plectrocnemia.	
Plectrocnemia ohlhoffi	Sp. nov	Valid	Wichard & Xu	Cretaceous	Burmese amber	Myanmar	A species of Plectrocnemia.	
Protoclipsis	Gen. et 3 sp. nov	Valid	Wichard, Müller & Fischer	Cretaceous	Burmese amber	Myanmar	A member of Annulipalpia belonging to the group Psychomyiodea. The type species is P. ulmeri; genus also includes new species P. picteti and P. roeseli.	

=== Other amphiesmenopterans ===
==== New taxa ====
Name	Novelty	Status	Authors	Age	Type locality	Location	Notes	Images
Anecrotaulius	Gen. et comb. nov	Valid	Engel	Early Cretaceous	Yixian Formation	China	A member of the family Necrotauliidae, assigned by Engel (2022) to the new amphiesmenopteran order Necrotrichoptera. The type species is "Necrotaulius" qingshilaense Hong (1984).	
Microcarbonella	Gen. et sp. nov	Valid	Prokop et al.	Carboniferous (Moscovian)	Osnabrück Formation	Germany	A stem group Amphiesmenopteran. The type species is M. paradoxa.	
Necrotaulius americanus	Sp. nov	Valid	Pierwola & Grimaldi	Late Triassic (Norian)	Cow Branch Formation	United States	A Necrotauliidae Amphiesmenoptera.	
Paranecrotaulius	Gen. et comb. nov	Valid	Engel	Triassic	Madygen Formation	Kyrgyzstan	A member of the family Necrotauliidae. The type species is "Necrotaulius" proximus Sukatsheva (1973).	

==== Other amphiesmenopteran research ====
- Khramov, Naugolnykh & Węgierek (2022) report the presence of elongate mouthparts with similar morphology to those of some present-day nectarivorous beetles and hymenopterans in Permian protomeropids from Russia, representing the earliest record of insects with siphonate-like mouthparts, which were possibly used to gather sugary fluids from the semi-closed ovulate organs of the gymnosperms of a peltaspermalean affinity known from the same locality.

== Clade Antliophora ==
=== Dipterans ===
==== Brachycerans ====
Name	Novelty	Status	Authors	Age	Type locality	Location	Notes	Images
Araripus	Gen. et sp. nov	Valid	Carmo & Sampronha in Carmo et al.	Early Cretaceous (Aptian)	Crato Formation	Brazil	A horse-fly. The type species is A. crassitibialis.	
Archeoxyla	Gen. et sp. nov	In press	Han et al.	Cretaceous	Burmese amber	Myanmar	A wood soldier fly. The type species is A. gigantea.	
Brevitrichia messogenes	Sp. nov	Valid	Greenwalt & Winterton in Greenwalt et al.	Eocene	Kishenehn Formation	United States (Montana)	A member of the family Scenopinidae belonging to the subfamily Scenopininae and the tribe Metatrichini.	
Clemoxyla	Gen. et sp. nov	In press	Han et al.	Cretaceous	Burmese amber	Myanmar	A member of the family Xylomyidae. Genus includes new species C. aculeolata.	
Cratotabanus cearensis	Sp. nov	Valid	Carmo & Sampronha in Carmo et al.	Early Cretaceous (Aptian)	Crato Formation	Brazil	A horse-fly.	
Gujaratmyia	Gen. et sp. nov	Valid	Bickel in Bickel et al.	Eocene		India	A member of the family Dolichopodidae. The type species is G. rotunda.	
Hoplocyrtoma eocenica	Sp. nov	Valid	Sinclair & Greenwalt in Greenwalt et al.	Eocene	Kishenehn Formation	United States (Montana)	A member of the family Hybotidae belonging to the subfamily Bicellariinae.	
Leptogaster? cerestensis	Sp. nov	In press	Nel & Jouault	Early Oligocene		France	A member of the family Asilidae belonging to the subfamily Leptogastrinae.	
Microphorella fragilis	Sp. nov	Valid	Cumming & Greenwalt in Greenwalt et al.	Eocene	Kishenehn Formation	United States (Montana)	A species of Microphorella.	
Opetia americana	Sp. nov	Valid	Amorim & Greenwalt in Greenwalt et al.	Eocene	Kishenehn Formation	United States (Montana)	A member of the family Opetiidae.	
Palaeoapsilocephala	Gen. et sp. nov	Valid	Hauser & Greenwalt in Greenwalt et al.	Eocene	Kishenehn Formation	United States (Montana)	A member of the family Apsilocephalidae. The type species is P. kishenehnensis.	
Palaeomedeterus cambayensis	Sp. nov	Valid	Bickel in Bickel et al.	Eocene		India	A member of the family Dolichopodidae, possibly belonging to the subfamily Peloropeodinae.	
Rajpardia	Gen. et sp. nov	Valid	Bickel in Bickel et al.	Eocene		India	A member of the family Dolichopodidae. The type species is R. grimaldii.	
Tmemophlebia carolinae	Sp. nov	Valid	Evenhuis & Greenwalt in Greenwalt et al.	Eocene	Kishenehn Formation	United States (Montana)	A species of Tmemophlebia.	

==== Nematocerans ====
Name	Novelty	Status	Authors	Age	Type locality	Location	Notes	Images
Afroscatopse	Gen. et sp. nov	Valid	Szadziewski et al.	Miocene	Ethiopian amber	Ethiopia	A member of the family Scatopsidae. The type species is A. haennii.	
Antodicranomyia rubra	Sp. nov	Valid	Kania-Kłosok, Perrichot & Krzemiński	Late Cretaceous (Cenomanian)	Charentese amber	France	A Limoniid cranefly.	
Archizelmira jarzembowskii	Sp. nov	Valid	Lukashevich	Middle Jurassic (Bathonian)	Itat Formation	Russia (Krasnoyarsk Krai)	A member of the family Archizelmiridae.	
Azana akarenos	Sp. nov	Valid	Kerr & Greenwalt in Greenwalt et al.	Eocene	Kishenehn Formation	United States (Montana)	A member of the family Mycetophilidae belonging to the subfamily Sciophilinae.	
Chaoborus kishenehnicus	Sp. nov	Valid	Raranov & Haug in Baranov et al.	Eocene	Kishenehn Formation	United States (Montana)	A member of the family Chaoboridae.	
Cretomanota	Gen. et sp. nov		Amorim et al.	Early Cretaceous (Aptian)	Crato Formation	Brazil	A member of the family Mycetophilidae belonging to the subfamily Leiinae. The type species is C. gondwanica.	
Dilophus cerestensis	Sp. nov	Valid	Nel, Legal & Coster	Early Oligocene		France	A species of Dilophus.	
Dilophus idanos	Sp. nov	Valid	Fitzgerald & Greenwalt in Greenwalt et al.	Eocene	Kishenehn Formation	United States (Montana)	A species of Dilophus.	
Docidiadia grimaldii	Sp. nov	Valid	Amorim & Brown	Cretaceous	Burmese amber	Myanmar	A member of the family Diadocidiidae.	
Eltxo grimaldii	Sp. nov	Valid	Peñalver, Arillo & Nel	Early Cretaceous (Albian)	El Soplao amber	Spain	A member of the family Cecidomyiidae.	
Eloeophila eocenica	Sp. nov		Santos, Teramoto Klein & Ribeiro	Eocene	Baltic amber	Russia (Kaliningrad Oblast)	A species of Eloeophila.	
Eloeophila scudderi	Nom. nov		Santos, Teramoto Klein & Ribeiro	Eocene	Florissant Formation	United States (Colorado)	A species of Eloeophila; a replacement name for Cladura maculata Scudder (1894).	
Fushuniola	Gen. et sp. nov	Valid	Fedotova & Perkovsky in Fedotova et al.	Eocene (Ypresian)	Fushun amber	China	A member of the family Cecidomyiidae. The type species is F. mai.	
Gonomyia burmitica	Sp. nov	Valid	Kania-Kłosok et al.	Late Cretaceous (Cenomanian)	Burmese amber	Myanmar	A limoniid cranefly, a species of Gonomyia.	
Gonomyia penalveri	Sp. nov	Valid	Kania-Kłosok et al.	Early Cretaceous (Albian)		Spain	A limoniid cranefly, a species of Gonomyia.	
Hintelmanniella	Gen. et sp. nov	Valid	Baranov & Haug in Baranov et al.	Eocene	Kishenehn Formation	United States (Montana)	A member of the family Chironomidae belonging to the tribe Chironomini. The type species is H. noncatafractata.	
Hoploscatopse	Gen. et sp. nov	In press	Haenni & Ševčík	Cretaceous	Burmese amber	Myanmar	A member of the family Scatopsidae. The type species is H. prisca.	
Leptotarsus acciolii	Sp. nov		Santos, Carvalho & Ribeiro	Early Cretaceous	Crato Formation	Brazil	A species of Leptotarsus.	
Leptotarsus alemaoi	Sp. nov		Santos, Carvalho & Ribeiro	Early Cretaceous	Crato Formation	Brazil	A species of Leptotarsus.	
Leptotarsus bonifacioi	Sp. nov		Santos, Carvalho & Ribeiro	Early Cretaceous	Crato Formation	Brazil	A species of Leptotarsus.	
Leptotarsus capanemai	Sp. nov		Santos, Carvalho & Ribeiro	Early Cretaceous	Crato Formation	Brazil	A species of Leptotarsus.	
Leptotarsus coutoi	Sp. nov		Santos, Carvalho & Ribeiro	Early Cretaceous	Crato Formation	Brazil	A species of Leptotarsus.	
Leptotarsus feijoi	Sp. nov		Santos, Carvalho & Ribeiro	Early Cretaceous	Crato Formation	Brazil	A species of Leptotarsus.	
Leptotarsus ferreirai	Sp. nov		Santos, Carvalho & Ribeiro	Early Cretaceous	Crato Formation	Brazil	A species of Leptotarsus.	
Leptotarsus lagosi	Sp. nov		Santos, Carvalho & Ribeiro	Early Cretaceous	Crato Formation	Brazil	A species of Leptotarsus.	
Leptotarsus lemesi	Sp. nov		Santos, Carvalho & Ribeiro	Early Cretaceous	Crato Formation	Brazil	A species of Leptotarsus.	
Leptotarsus pereirai	Sp. nov		Santos, Carvalho & Ribeiro	Early Cretaceous	Crato Formation	Brazil	A species of Leptotarsus.	
Leptotarsus petrii	Sp. nov		Santos, Carvalho & Ribeiro	Early Cretaceous	Crato Formation	Brazil	A species of Leptotarsus.	
Leptotarsus velosoi	Sp. nov		Santos, Carvalho & Ribeiro	Early Cretaceous	Crato Formation	Brazil	A species of Leptotarsus.	
Liassorhyphus	Gen. et sp. nov	Valid	Nel & Huang in Wang et al.	Early Jurassic (Pliensbachian-Toarcian)	Sangonghe Formation	China	A member of the family Anisopodidae. The type species is L. liaoi.	
Libanonemopalpus	Gen. et sp. nov	Valid	Azar et al.	Early Cretaceous (Barremian)	Lebanese amber	Lebanon	A member of the family Psychodidae belonging to the subfamily Bruchomyiinae. The type species is L. grimaldii.	
Libanophlebotomites	Gen. et sp. nov	Valid	Azar, Maalouf & Maksoud	Early Cretaceous (Barremian)	Lebanese amber	Lebanon	A member of the family Psychodidae belonging to the subfamily Phlebotominae. Genus includes new species L. ramyi.	
Macrocera apithanos	Sp. nov	Valid	Kerr & Greenwalt in Greenwalt et al.	Eocene	Kishenehn Formation	United States (Montana)	A species of Macrocera.	
Monogedania	Gen. et comb. nov	Valid	Szadziewski et al.	Eocene	Baltic amber	Baltic Sea region Germany Ukraine	A member of the tribe Ceratopogonini. The type species is "Ceratopogon" clunipes Loew (1850).	
Paleopsychoda jarzembowskii	Sp. nov	Valid	Azar & Maksoud	Early Cretaceous (Barremian)	Lebanese amber	Lebanon	A member of the family Psychodidae.	
Plecia jorgecaridadi	Sp. nov	In press	Rosse-Guillevic et al.	Miocene; Burdigalian	Dominican Amber	Dominican Republic	A species of Plecia.	
Plecia surieli	Sp. nov	In press	Rosse-Guillevic et al.	Miocene; Burdigalian	Dominican Amber	Dominican Republic	A species of Plecia.	
Protoanisolarva	Gen. et sp. nov	Valid	Peñalver et al.	Middle Triassic (Anisian)	Estellencs Formation	Spain	A member of the stem group of the family Anisopodidae. The type species is P. juarezi.	
Psectrosciara crassieton	Sp. nov	Valid	Amorim & Greenwalt in Greenwalt et al.	Eocene	Kishenehn Formation	United States (Montana)	A member of the family Scatopsidae belonging to the subfamily Psectrosciarinae.	
Psectrosciara makrochaites	Sp. nov	Valid	Amorim & Greenwalt in Greenwalt et al.	Eocene	Kishenehn Formation	United States (Montana)	A member of the family Scatopsidae belonging to the subfamily Psectrosciarinae.	
Pseudoerioptera	Gen. et sp. nov		Men, Hu & Starkevich	Cretaceous	Burmese amber	Myanmar	A member of the subfamily Chioneinae. Genus includes new species P. hubenqii.	
Rheotanytarsus lacustris	Sp. nov	Valid	Baranov & Haug in Baranov et al.	Eocene	Kishenehn Formation	United States (Montana)	A species of Rheotanytarsus.	
Sycorax longistyla	Sp. nov	Valid	Wagner, Agnihotri & Singh	Early Eocene	Cambay amber	India	A species of Sycorax.	
Toxorhina (Ceratocheilus) christelius	Sp. nov	Valid	Kania-Kłosok, Krzemiński & Szwedo	Eocene	Baltic amber	Europe (Baltic Sea region)	A species of Toxorhina.	
Triassomyia	Gen. et sp. nov	Valid	Lukashevich	Triassic (Ladinian–Carnian)	Madygen Formation	Kyrgyzstan	A member of the family Chaoboridae. The type species is T. shcherbakovi	
Trichomyia (Trichomyia) fudalai	Sp. nov	Valid	Azar, Pielowska-Ceranowska & Szwedo	Miocene	Dominican amber	Dominican Republic	A species of Trichomyia.	
Trichomyia (Septemtrichomyia) grimaldii	Sp. nov	Valid	Azar, Pielowska-Ceranowska & Szwedo	Miocene	Dominican amber	Dominican Republic	A species of Trichomyia.	
Zwickina	Gen. et sp. nov		Lukashevich & Vorontsov	Cretaceous	Burmese amber	Myanmar	A member of the family Blephariceridae. Genus includes new species Z. minaevi.	

===== Dipteran research =====
- A redescription of Minyohelea nexuosa, based on data from a new specimen from the Lower Cretaceous Lebanese amber, is published by Pielowska-Ceranowska, Azar & Szwedo (2022).
- A review of the fossil record of the subfamily Microphorinae is published by Shamshev & Perkovsky (2022).

=== Mecoptera ===
Name	Novelty	Status	Authors	Age	Type locality	Location	Notes	Images
Agetopanorpa sinica	Sp. nov	Valid	Lian, Cai & Huang	Middle Triassic		China	A member of the family Permochoristidae.	
Baltipanorpa oppressiva	Sp. nov	Valid	Soszyńska-Maj & Krzemiński in Soszyńska-Maj et al.	Eocene	Baltic amber	Europe (Baltic Sea region)	A member of the family Panorpidae.	
Burmorthophlebia	Gen. et 2 sp. nov	Valid	Soszyńska-Maj, Krzemiński & Wang in Soszyńska-Maj et al.	Late Cretaceous (Cenomanian)	Burmese amber	Myanmar	A member of the family Orthophlebiidae. The type species is B. multiprocessa Soszyńska-Maj, Krzemiński & Wang in Soszyńska-Maj et al.; genus also includes B. macularis Zhang et al..	
Burmothauma	Gen. et sp. nov	In press	Zhang et al.	Cretaceous	Burmese amber	Myanmar	A member of the family Eomeropidae. Genus includes new species B. eureka.	
Cantabra	Fam. et gen. et sp. nov	Valid	Soszyńska-Maj, Pérez-de la Fuente, Krzemiński & Wang in Soszyńska-Maj et al.	Early Cretaceous (Albian)	El Soplao amber	Spain	A member of Panorpoidea belonging to the new family Cantabridae. The type species is C. soplao.	
Chaohuchorista	Gen. et sp. nov	Valid	Lian, Cai & Huang	Permian (Guadalupian)	Yinping Formation	China	A member of the family Permochoristidae. Genus includes new species C. liaoi.	
Chimaeropteron	Gen. et 2 sp. nov	Valid	Bashkuev			Russia	A member of the family Permotanyderidae. Genus includes new species C. antiquum and C. agmatos.	
Eremobittacus opeth	Sp. nov	Valid	Poschmann & Nel	Late Oligocene	Enspel Formation	Germany	A hangingfly.	
Itaphlebia elegana	Sp. nov	Valid	Cao, Shih & Ren in Cao et al.	Middle Jurassic (Bathonian–Callovian)	Jiulongshan Formation	China	A member of the family Nannochoristidae.	
Itaphlebia procera	Sp. nov	Valid	Cao, Shih & Ren in Cao et al.	Middle Jurassic (Bathonian–Callovian)	Jiulongshan Formation	China	A member of the family Nannochoristidae.	
Mesochorista tongchuanensis	Sp. nov	Valid	Lian, Cai & Huang	Middle Triassic		China	A member of the family Permochoristidae.	
Permeca chaohuensis	Sp. nov	Valid	Lian, Cai & Huang	Permian (Capitanian)	Yinping Formation	China	A member of the family Permochoristidae.	
Permotanyderites	Gen. et sp. nov	Valid	Bashkuev			Russia	A member of the family Permotanyderidae. Genus includes new species P. pseudopolycentropoides.	
Permotanyderus sensibilis	Sp. nov	Valid	Bashkuev			Russia	A member of the family Permotanyderidae.	
Permotanyderus sibiricus	Sp. nov	Valid	Bashkuev			Russia	A member of the family Permotanyderidae.	
Rudimentanus	Gen. et 2 sp. nov	Valid	Bashkuev			Russia	A member of the family Permotanyderidae. Genus includes new species R. rieki and R. cisuralicus.	

== Clade Archaeorthoptera ==
=== †Cnemidolestida ===
Name	Novelty	Status	Authors	Age	Type locality	Location	Notes	Images
Roqueia	Fam. et gen. et sp. nov	In press	Nel, Vallois & Duquesne	Carboniferous (Kasimovian)		France	An archaeorthopteran belonging to the new family Roqueiidae, possibly belonging to the group Cnemidolestodea. Genus includes new species R. alpine.	

=== Orthopterans ===
Name	Novelty	Status	Authors	Age	Type locality	Location	Notes	Images
Aenigmaraphidophora	Gen. et sp. nov	Valid	Azar, Maalouf & Nel	Early Cretaceous	Lebanese amber	Lebanon	A member of Tettigoniidea of uncertain affinities. The type species is A. mouniri.	
Apiculatus	Gen. et sp. nov	Valid	Yuan, Ma & Gu in Yuan et al.	Cretaceous (Albian-Cenomanian)	Burmese amber	Myanmar	A member of the family Gryllidae belonging to the subfamily Oecanthinae. The type species is A. cretaceus.	
Archelcana numbergerae	Sp. nov	Valid	Heads, Thuy & Tamarri	Early Jurassic (Toarcian)		Luxembourg	A member of the family Elcanidae.	
Archelcana tina	Sp. nov	Valid	Heads, Thuy & Tamarri	Early Jurassic (Toarcian)		Luxembourg	A member of the family Elcanidae.	
Bacharaboilus curvus	Sp. nov	Valid	Gu et al.	Middle Jurassic		China	A member of the family Prophalangopsidae.	
Birmanioecanthus	Gen. et sp. nov	Valid	Yuan, Ma & Gu in Yuan et al.	Cretaceous (Albian-Cenomanian)	Burmese amber	Myanmar	A member of the family Gryllidae belonging to the subfamily Oecanthinae. The type species is B. haplostichus.	
Burmaripipteryx	Gen. et sp. nov		Zhao et al.	Cretaceous	Burmese amber	Myanmar	A member of the family Ripipterygidae. Genus includes new species B. oblongus.	
Chunxiania	Gen. et sp. nov	Disputed	Xu et al.	Cretaceous	Burmese amber	Myanmar	A mole cricket or a member of the family Gryllidae. Genus includes new species C. fania. Cadena-Castañeda et al. (2023) considered it to be a junior synonym of Pherodactylus rectanguli (Xu, Fang & Wang, 2020).	
Curvospurus	Gen. et sp. nov	In press	Liu, Yu & He	Cretaceous	Burmese amber	Myanmar	A member of the family Trigonidiidae. The type species is C. huzhengkun.	
Gryllobencain	Gen. et sp. nov	Valid	Haug et al.	Cretaceous	Burmese amber	Myanmar	An ensiferan of uncertain affinities. The type species is G. patrickmuelleri.	
Lusitadischia	Gen. et sp. nov	In press	Correia & Nel	Carboniferous (Gzhelian)		Portugal	A member of the family Oedischiidae. The type species is L. sai.	
Magnidactylus gracilis	Sp. nov	Valid	Gu, Zheng, Cao & Yue in Gu et al.	Late Cretaceous (Cenomanian)	Burmese amber	Myanmar	A member of the family Ripipterygidae. Originally described as a species of Magnidactylus, but subsequently transferred to the genus Yakkhapipteryx.	
Magnidactylus mirus	Sp. nov	Valid	Gu, Zheng, Cao & Yue in Gu et al.	Late Cretaceous (Cenomanian)	Burmese amber	Myanmar	A member of the family Ripipterygidae. Originally described as a species of Magnidactylus, but subsequently made the type species of the separate genus Yakkhapipteryx.	
Monitelcana	Gen. et sp. nov		Xu et al.	Cretaceous	Burmese amber	Myanmar	A member of the family Elcanidae. The type species is M. penalveri.	
Novaboilus ovatus	Sp. nov	Valid	Gu et al.	Middle Jurassic		China	A member of the family Prophalangopsidae.	
Panorpidium acusicaudum	Sp. nov	Valid	Tian, Ren & Gu	Early Cretaceous	Yixian Formation	China	A member of the family Elcanidae.	
Panorpidium maculosum	Sp. nov	Valid	Zhou et al.	Cretaceous	Burmese amber	Myanmar	A member of the family Elcanidae. Subsequently transferred to the genus Pseudopanorpidium by Willmott et al. (2025).	
Panorpidium validum	Sp. nov	Valid	Tian, Ren & Gu	Early Cretaceous	Yixian Formation	China	A member of the family Elcanidae.	
Parabintoniella	Gen. et sp. nov	Valid	Béthoux & Grauvogel-Stamm	Middle Triassic	Grès à Voltzia Formation	France	A member of the family Bintoniellidae. The type species is P. papierae.	
Proararipegryllus	Gen. et sp. et comb. nov	In press	Gorochov & Coram	Early Cretaceous	Wealden Group	United Kingdom	A member of Grylloidea. Genus includes new species P. andrewi, as well as "Araripegryllus" orientalis Gorochov, Jarzembowski & Coram (2006).	
Probaisselcana minuta	Sp. nov	Valid	Gu et al.	Early Cretaceous	Yixian Formation	China	A member of the family Elcanidae.	
Probaisselcana zhengi	Sp. nov	Valid	Gu et al.	Cretaceous	Burmese amber	Myanmar	A member of the family Elcanidae. Originally described as a species of Probaisselcana, but subsequently transferred to the genus Adelphellca.	
Republicopteron	Gen. et sp. nov	Valid	Archibald, Gu & Mathewes	Early Eocene	Klondike Mountain Formation	United States (Washington)	A Palaeorehniidae ensiferan. The type species is R. douseae.	Republicopteron douseae
?Sibelcana websteri	Sp. nov	In press	Gorochov & Coram	Early Cretaceous	Purbeck Group	United Kingdom	A member of Elcanoidea.	
Transigryllus	Gen. et sp. nov	In press	Gorochov & Coram	Early Cretaceous	Wealden Group	United Kingdom	A member of Grylloidea. Genus includes new species T. edmundi.	
Tresdigitus gracilis	Sp. nov	Disputed	Jiang et al.	Cretaceous	Burmese amber	Myanmar	A mole cricket or a member of the family Gryllidae. Cadena-Castañeda et al. (2023) considered it to be a junior synonym of Pherodactylus rectanguli (Xu, Fang & Wang, 2020).	
Ypopteron	Gen. et sp. nov	Valid	Archibald, Gu & Mathewes	Early Eocene	Quilchena site	Canada (British Columbia)	A Palaeorehniidae ensiferan. The type species is Y. nicola.	

==== Orthopteran research ====
- Putative liomopterid Alekhosara reticulata is reinterpreted as a possible locustavid caeliferan, and thus possibly the oldest known caeliferan, by Aristov & Gorochov (2022).
- Evidence of the presence of the earliest tympanal ears and sound-producing system in exceptionally preserved Mesozoic katydids, interpreted as indicating that katydids evolved a high diversity of singing frequencies at least by the Late Triassic, and complex acoustic communication at least by the Middle Jurassic, is presented by Xu et al. (2022).

=== †Titanoptera ===
Name	Novelty	Status	Authors	Age	Type locality	Location	Notes	Images
Magnatitan	Gen. et sp. nov	Valid	Park et al.	Late Triassic	Amisan Formation	South Korea	A titanopteran belonging to the family Paratitanidae. The type species is M. jongheoni.	Magnatitan jongheoni

=== Other panorthopterans ===
Name	Novelty	Status	Authors	Age	Type locality	Country	Notes	Images
Hispanopteron	Gen. et sp. nov	Valid	Santos et al.	Late Carboniferous		Spain	Genus includes new species H. romerali. Announced in 2022; the final article version was published in 2023.	

== Clade Coleopterida ==
=== Coleopterans ===
==== Adephaga ====
Name	Novelty	Status	Authors	Age	Type locality	Country	Notes	Images
Antephilorhizus zerovae	Sp. nov	Valid	Kirichenko-Babko & Perkovsky in Kirichenko-Babko, Perkovsky & Vasilenko	Eocene	Rovno amber	Ukraine	A lebiine ground beetle.	
Apermunda	Gen. et comb. nov	In press	Kirejtshuk & Ansorge	Permian-Triassic transition		Russia (Kemerovo Oblast)	A member of the family Trachypachidae; a new genus for "Petrodromeus" minor Ponomarenko & Volkov (2013).	
Cretomigadops	Gen. et sp. nov		Liu et al.	Cretaceous	Burmese amber	Myanmar	A migadopine ground beetle. Genus includes new species C. bidentatus.	
Holcoptera rasnitsyni	Sp. nov	Valid	Ponomarenko & Fedorenko in Ponomarenko, Fedorenko & Bashkuev	Late Triassic (Carnian–Norian)	Protopivka Formation	Ukraine	A member of the family Coptoclavidae.	
Hujia	Gen. et sp. nov	In press	Song, Jarzembowski & Xiao	Cretaceous	Burmese amber	Myanmar	A tiger beetle belonging to the tribe Manticorini. The type species is H. rolfi.	
Liassodites	Gen. et sp. nov	In press	Kirejtshuk & Ansorge	Early Jurassic (Toarcian)	Grimmen Formation	Germany	A member of the family Trachypachidae. The type species is L. obsti.	
Novunda	Nom. nov	In press	Kirejtshuk & Ansorge	Jurassic		China; Russia (Zabaykalsky Krai)	A member of the family Trachypachidae; a replacement name for Unda Ponomarenko (1977).	
Quasicalathus	Gen. et 2 sp. et comb. nov	Valid	Schmidt & Will in Schmidt, Scholz & Will	Eocene	Rovno amber	Baltic Sea region Ukraine	A ground beetle belonging to the tribe Sphodrini. The type species is Q. conservans; genus also includes new species Q. agonicollis, as well as "Calathus" elpis Ortuño & Arillo (2009).	

==== Archostemata ====
Name	Novelty	Status	Authors	Age	Type locality	Country	Notes	Images
Lepidomma beuteli	Sp. nov	In press	Song, Jarzembowski & Xiao	Cretaceous	Burmese amber	Myanmar	An ommatine.	
Mallecupes zhangi	Sp. nov	In press	Song, Jarzembowski & Xiao	Cretaceous	Burmese amber	Myanmar	A member of the family Cupedidae.	
Notocupes premeris	Sp. nov	Valid	Lee, Nam & Li	Early Cretaceous (Albian)	Jinju Formation	South Korea	Originally described as a species of Notocupes; Strelnikova & Yan (2023) transferred it to the genus Brachilatus.	

==== Myxophaga ====
Name	Novelty	Status	Authors	Age	Type locality	Country	Notes	Images
Bezesporum burmiticum	Sp. nov		Fikáček et al.	Cretaceous	Burmese amber	Myanmar	A member of the family Sphaeriusidae, related to extant taxa Bezesporum minutum (formerly Sphaerius minutus, the type species of the genus Bezesporum) and Bezesporum papulosum (formerly Sphaerius papulosus).	

==== †Protocoleoptera ====
===== Protocoleopteran research =====
- A study on the anatomy and affinities of Coleopsis archaica is published by Schädel, Yavorskaya & Beutel (2022).
- A study on the anatomy and phylogenetic affinities of members of the family Tshekardocoleidae is published by Boudinot et al. (2022), who name new clades Mesocoleoptera (containing all coleopterans except tshekardocoleids) and Metacoleoptera (containing all mesocoleopterans except permocupedids).

==== Polyphaga ====
===== Bostrichiformia =====
Name	Novelty	Status	Authors	Age	Type locality	Country	Notes	Images
Alitrepanum	Gen. et sp. nov	Disputed	Peng et al.	Cretaceous	Burmese amber	Myanmar	A member of the family Bostrichidae. Genus includes new species A. aladelicatum. Legalov & Háva (2022) considered the genus Alitrepanum to be a junior synonym of the genus Poinarinius, though the authors maintained A. aladelicatum as a distinct species within the latter genus.	
Anthrenus larvalis	Comb nov	In press	(Cockerell) Háva	Cenomanian	Burmese amber	Myanmar	Moved from Dermestes larvalis (1917)	
Lasioderma michalskii	Sp. nov	Valid	Háva & Zahradník	Eocene	Baltic amber	Poland	A species of Lasioderma.	
Nothattagenus	Gen. et comb. nov	Disputed	Li & Cai in Li, Huang & Cai	Cretaceous	Burmese amber	Myanmar	A member of the family Dermestidae belonging to the subfamily Orphilinae; a new genus for "Attagenus" burmiticus Cai, Háva & Huang (2017). Háva (2023) considered Nothattagenus to be a junior synonym of the genus Ranolus, and transferred "Attagenus" burmiticus to the latter genus.	
Poinarinius antonkozlovi	Sp. nov	Valid	Legalov & Háva	Cretaceous	Burmese amber	Myanmar	A member of the family Bostrichidae.	
Poinarinius aristovi	Sp. nov	Valid	Legalov & Háva	Cretaceous	Burmese amber	Myanmar	A member of the family Bostrichidae.	
Poinarinius borowskii	Sp. nov	Valid	Legalov & Háva	Cretaceous	Burmese amber	Myanmar	A member of the family Bostrichidae.	
Poinarinius cretaceus	Sp. nov	Valid	Legalov & Háva	Cretaceous	Burmese amber	Myanmar	A member of the family Bostrichidae.	
Poinarinius lesnei	Sp. nov	Valid	Legalov & Háva	Cretaceous	Burmese amber	Myanmar	A member of the family Bostrichidae.	
Poinarinius perkovskyi	Sp. nov	Valid	Legalov & Háva	Cretaceous	Burmese amber	Myanmar	A member of the family Bostrichidae.	
Poinarinius zahradniki	Sp. nov	Valid	Legalov & Háva	Cretaceous	Burmese amber	Myanmar	A member of the family Bostrichidae.	
Stagetus michalskii	Sp. nov	Valid	Háva & Zahradník	Eocene	Baltic amber	Poland	A species of Stagetus.	
Stagetus szydlowskae	Sp. nov	Valid	Háva & Zahradník	Eocene	Baltic amber	Poland	A species of Stagetus.	
Stagetus zahradniki	Sp. nov	Valid	Háva	Eocene	Baltic amber	Poland	A species of Stagetus.	
Sucinoptinus zahradniki	Sp. nov	Valid	Háva	Eocene	Baltic amber	Poland	A species of Sucinoptinus.	
Tuberphradonoma secunda	Sp. nov	Valid	Háva	Late Cretaceous (Cenomanian)	Burmese amber	Myanmar	A member of the family Dermestidae belonging to the subfamily Megatominae and the tribe Megatomini.	

===== Cucujiformia =====
====== New taxa ======
Name	Novelty	Status	Authors	Age	Type locality	Country	Notes	Images
Alloterocucus	Gen. et sp. nov	Valid	Li, Leschen, Liu & Cai in Li et al.	Cretaceous (Albian to Cenomanian)	Burmese amber	Myanmar	A member of Cucujoidea that may be allied to the family Lamingtoniidae. The type species is A. atratus.	Alloterocucus atratus
Anancites	Nom. nov	Valid	Perkovsky	Late Cretaceous (Cenomanian)	Burmese amber	Myanmar	A member of the family Lymexylidae; a replacement name for Adamas Chen & Zhang (2020).	
Archaeoheilus gallicus	Sp. nov	Valid	Legalov, Kirejtshuk & Nel	Paleocene		France	A member of the family Curculionidae belonging to the subfamily Molytinae.	
Atomaria (Anchicera) alekseevi	Sp. nov	Valid	Lyubarsky & Bukejs	Eocene	Baltic amber	Russia (Kaliningrad Oblast)	A species of Atomaria.	
Atomaria (Anchicera) perkovskyi	Sp. nov	Valid	Lyubarsky & Bukejs	Eocene	Rovno amber	Ukraine	A species of Atomaria.	
Austronausibius aenigmatista	Sp. nov	Valid	Alekseev & Bukejs	Eocene	Rovno amber	Ukraine	A species of Austronausibius.	
Baltoconapium vilhelmseni	Sp. nov	Valid	Legalov	Eocene	Baltic amber	Europe (Baltic Sea region)	A member of the family Brentidae.	
Chramesus boninoi	Sp. nov		Legalov	Miocene	Dominican amber	Dominican Republic	A species of Chramesus.	
Cretakarenni shaoi	Sp. nov	Valid	Li & Cai in Li, Huang & Cai	Cretaceous	Burmese amber	Myanmar	A member of the family Monotomidae.	
Cretostenotarsus	Gen. et sp. nov	Valid	Tomaszewska, Szawaryn & Arriaga-Varela	Cretaceous (Albian-Cenomanian)	Burmese amber	Myanmar	A member of the family Endomychidae. The type species is C. striatus.	
Cyrtanaspis kerneggeri	Sp. nov	Valid	Perkovsky et al.	Eocene	Baltic amber	Europe (Baltic Sea region)	A species of Cyrtanaspis.	
Delteredolaemus	Gen. et sp. nov	Valid	Li & Cai in Li, Huang & Cai	Cretaceous (Albian to Cenomanian)	Burmese amber	Myanmar	A member of the family Teredidae. The type species is D. hei.	
Demimaea gratshevi	Sp. nov	Valid	Legalov, Vasilenko & Perkovsky	Eocene	Rovno amber	Ukraine	A member of the family Curculionidae.	
Demimaea zherichini	Sp. nov	Valid	Legalov, Vasilenko & Perkovsky	Eocene	Rovno amber	Ukraine	A member of the family Curculionidae.	
Eduardoxenus rasnitsyni	Sp. nov		Legalov	Eocene	Baltic amber	Russia (Kaliningrad Oblast)	A member of the family Anthribidae belonging to the subfamily Choraginae.	
Eocenocolaspis	Gen. et sp. nov	Valid	Bukejs, Moseyko & Alekseev	Eocene	Baltic amber	Russia (Kaliningrad Oblast)	A leaf beetle belonging to the subfamily Eumolpinae. Genus includes new species E. aurichalceus.	
Eustrophus praecursor	Sp. nov	Valid	Alekseev & Bukejs	Eocene	Baltic amber	Russia (Kaliningrad Oblast)	A species of Eustrophus.	
Gongyloceria	Gen. et sp. nov	Valid	Legalov & Poinar	Miocene	Dominican amber	Dominican Republic	An ambrosia beetle belonging to the tribe Mecopelmini. The type species is G. dominicana.	
Grzymalia	Gen. et sp. nov	In press	Bao et al.	Cretaceous	Burmese amber	Myanmar	A member of the family Aderidae. Genus includes new species G. wukong.	
Homalenchodes	Gen. et sp. nov	Valid	Li, Hsiao, Yoshitomi & Cai in Li et al.	Cretaceous	Burmese amber	Myanmar	A member of the family Melandryidae. The type species is H. jarzembowskii.	
Hylastes perkovskyi	Sp. nov		Legalov	Eocene	Rovno amber	Ukraine	A species of Hylastes.	
Leiestes tomaszewskae	Sp. nov	Valid	Alekseev & Bukejs in Alekseev, Kairišs & Bukejs	Eocene	Baltic amber	Russia (Kaliningrad Oblast)	A species of Leiestes.	
Paonaupactus zosimovichi	Sp. nov	Valid	Legalov, Vasilenko & Perkovsky	Eocene	Rovno amber	Ukraine	A member of the family Curculionidae belonging to the subfamily Entiminae and the tribe Anypotactini.	
Pelretes bicolor	Sp. nov	In press	Zhao et al.	Cretaceous	Burmese amber	Myanmar	Originally described as member of the family Kateretidae; subsequently argued to be a sap beetle belonging to the subfamily Apophisandrinae or a member of the separate family Apophisandridae.	
Placonotus sepulvedae	Sp. nov	Valid	Gomes & Souza	Miocene	Mexican amber	Mexico	A species of Placonotus.	
Pogonocherus minimus	Sp. nov	Valid	Vitali	Eocene	Baltic amber	Europe (Baltic Sea region)	A longhorn beetle, a species of Pogonocherus.	
Pogonocherus scutellaris	Sp. nov	Junior homonym	Vitali	Eocene	Baltic amber	Europe (Baltic Sea region)	A longhorn beetle, a species of Pogonocherus. The specific name is shared with Pogonocherus scutellaris Mulsant (1846); Vitali (2023) coined a replacement name Pogonocherus scutellatus.	
Poliaenus europaeus	Sp. nov	Valid	Vitali & Perkovsky	Eocene	Rovno amber	Ukraine	A species of Poliaenus.	
Promethis undulatus	Sp. nov	Valid	Nabozhenko & Tanaka	Miocene	Isarizawa Formation	Japan	A darkling beetle belonging to the subfamily Stenochiinae and the tribe Cnodalonini.	
Protonitidula	Gen. et sp. nov	Valid	Zhao, Huang & Cai	Cretaceous (Albian to Cenomanian)	Burmese amber	Myanmar	A sap beetle belonging to the subfamily Apophisandrinae or a member of the separate family Apophisandridae. The type species is P. neli.	
Pseudanthonomus antonkozlovi	Sp. nov	Valid	Legalov	Miocene	Mexican amber	Mexico	A species of Pseudanthonomus.	
Pseudauletes (Eopseudauletes) balticus	Sp. nov	Valid	Legalov	Eocene	Baltic amber	Europe (Baltic Sea region)	A member of the family Rhynchitidae.	
Raractocetus sverlilo	Sp. nov	Valid	Nazarenko, Perkovsky & Yamamoto in Yamamoto et al.	Late Eocene	Rovno amber	Ukraine	A member of the family Lymexylidae. Originally described as a species of Raractocetus, but subsequently transferred by Li et al. (2022) to the genus Cretoquadratus and by Kirejtshuk (2025) to the genus Lymexylopsis.	
Rhomeocalpsua	Gen. et sp. nov	Valid	Li, Tomaszewska & Cai in Li et al.	Cretaceous	Burmese amber	Myanmar	A member of the family Endomychidae. The type species is R. torosa.	
Rovnoeurops	Gen. et sp. nov	In press	Alekseev & Bukejs	Eocene	Rovno amber	Ukraine	A member of the family Monotomidae. Genus includes new species R. mckellari.	
Scaporetes	Gen. et sp. nov	Valid	Zhao, Huang & Cai	Cretaceous (Albian to Cenomanian)	Burmese amber	Myanmar	Originally described as a member of the family Kateretidae; subsequently argued to be a sap beetle belonging to the subfamily Apophisandrinae or a member of the separate family Apophisandridae. The type species is S. rectus.	
Synchita andrisbukejsi	Sp. nov	Valid	Alekseev	Eocene	Baltic amber	Russia (Kaliningrad Oblast)	A species of Synchita.	
Thallisellites	Gen. et sp. nov	Valid	Kupryjanowicz, Lyubarsky & Perkovsky	Late Eocene	Baltic amber	Europe (Baltic Sea region)	A member of the family Erotylidae belonging to the subfamily Languriinae. The type species is T. olgae.	
Thanerosus	Gen. et sp. nov	Valid	Peris & Kolibáč in Peris, Mähler & Kolibáč	Late Cretaceous (Cenomanian)	Burmese amber	Myanmar	A member of the family Thanerocleridae. The type species is T. antiquus.	
Vetuprostomis angularis	Sp. nov	Valid	Li & Cai in Li et al.	Cretaceous (Albian to Cenomanian)	Burmese amber	Myanmar	A member of the family Prostomidae.	
Vetuprostomis gaoi	Sp. nov	Valid	Li & Cai in Li et al.	Cretaceous (Albian to Cenomanian)	Burmese amber	Myanmar	A member of the family Prostomidae.	
Wanachia pinisucciniferae	Sp. nov	Valid	Alekseev & Bukejs	Eocene	Baltic amber	Europe (Baltic Sea region)	A member of the family Melandryidae.	
Xenostanus	Gen. et sp. nov	Valid	Li, Szawaryn & Cai in Li et al.	Cretaceous (Albian to Cenomanian)	Burmese amber	Myanmar	A member of the family Corylophidae. The type species is X. jiangkuni.	
Yakutia	Gen. et sp. nov	In press	Telnov et al.	Late Cretaceous (Cenomanian)	Yakutian amber	Russia (Sakha)	A member of the family Mordellidae. Genus includes new species Y. sukachevae.	
Zavaljus lyubarskyi	Sp. nov	In press	Alekseev & Bukejs	Eocene	Rovno amber	Ukraine	A species of Zavaljus.	

====== Cucujiform research ======
- Description of new specimens of scraptiid larvae with large, elongated terminal ends from the Eocene Baltic amber and Cretaceous Burmese amber (the latter representing the oldest record of these larvae reported to date), and a study on the morphological variation of these larvae is published by Zippel et al. (2022).
- Revision of the fossil lymexylids originally assigned to the genus Raractocetus is published by Li et al. (2022), who transfer the species Raractocetus balticus, R. extinctus, R. fossilis and R. sverlilo to the genus Cretoquadratus, and consider the species Cretoquadratus engeli to be a junior synonym of Cretoquadratus fossilis.

===== Elateriformia =====
====== New taxa ======
Name	Novelty	Status	Authors	Age	Type locality	Country	Notes	Images
Ajkaelater	Gen. et sp. nov	Valid	Szabó et al.	Late Cretaceous (Santonian)	Ajka Coal Formation	Hungary	An elaterid click beetle. The type species is A. merkli.	
Anomocephalobus	Gen. et sp. nov	Valid	Li, Jäch & Cai in Li et al.	Cretaceous (Albian to Cenomanian)	Burmese amber	Myanmar	A member of the family Limnichidae belonging to the subfamily Cephalobyrrhinae. The type species is A. liuhaoi.	
Asiocnemis colombicus	Sp. nov	Valid	Muona	Quaternary, exact age uncertain	Colombian resin	Colombia	A member of the family Eucnemidae belonging to the subfamily Macraulacinae.	
Bipogonia	Gen. et 2 sp. nov	Valid	Li, Kundrata & Cai in Li et al.	Cretaceous	Burmese amber	Myanmar	A member of the family Artematopodidae. Genus includes new species B. trivialis and B. fortis.	
Brevipterus	Gen. et comb. et 3 sp. nov	Valid	Zhao et al.	Cretaceous	Burmese amber	Myanmar	A soldier beetle. Genus includes "Sanaungulus" strungei Fanti & Damggard (2019), as well as new species B. acutiapicis, B. abtusiapicis and B. megacephalus.	
Burmochares	Gen. et sp. nov	Valid	Kirejtshuk & Prokin	Cretaceous (Albian-Cenomanian)	Burmese amber	Myanmar	A member of the family Limnichidae belonging to the subfamily Limnichinae. The type species is B. groehni.	
Burmogonus	Gen. et sp. nov	Valid	Triskova et al.	Cretaceous (Albian to Cenomanian)	Burmese amber	Myanmar	A click beetle belonging to the tribe Elaterini. The type species is B. cretaceus.	
Burmomiles parisii	Sp. nov	Valid	Fanti & Müller	Late Cretaceous (Cenomanian)	Burmese amber	Myanmar	A soldier beetle belonging to the subfamily Cantharinae.	
Burmomiles volpei	Sp. nov	Valid	Fanti & Müller	Late Cretaceous (Cenomanian)	Burmese amber	Myanmar	A soldier beetle belonging to the subfamily Cantharinae.	
Cacomorphocerus thomasiwentzeli	Sp. nov	Valid	Wentzel, Bonino & Fanti	Eocene	Baltic amber	Russia (Kaliningrad Oblast)	A soldier beetle belonging to the subfamily Cantharinae.	
Carinibipogonia	Gen. et sp. nov	Valid	Li, Kundrata & Cai in Li et al.	Cretaceous	Burmese amber	Myanmar	A member of the family Artematopodidae. The type species is C. xiai.	
Cessator anachronicus	Sp. nov	Valid	Ferrera & Ivie in Ferreira et al.	Oligocene-Miocene	Dominican amber	Dominican Republic	A member of the family Lycidae belonging to the subfamily Lycinae and the tribe Leptolycini.	
Chauliognathus koonwarra	Sp. nov	Valid	Fanti	Early Cretaceous (Aptian)	Koonwarra Fossil Bed	Australia	A soldier beetle, a species of Chauliognathus.	
Cretaceocoleus	Gen. et sp. nov	Valid	Tihelka & Cai in Tihelka et al.	Cretaceous (Albian–Cenomanian)	Burmese amber	Myanmar	A member of Dryopoidea belonging to the family Mastigocoleidae. The type species is C. saetosus Tihelka, Kundrata & Cai.	
Damzenium	Gen. et sp. nov	Valid	Kazantsev & Bocak	Late Eocene	Rovno amber	Ukraine	A member of the family Lycidae belonging to the subfamily Erotinae and the tribe Erotini. The type species is D. rivnense.	
Dariuszelater	Gen. et sp. nov	In press	Zhao, Shih & Ren	Late Cretaceous (Cenomanian)	Burmese amber	Myanmar	A click beetle. The type species is D. tarnawskii.	
Elektrokleinia thiloi	Sp. nov	Valid	Fanti & Müller	Late Cretaceous (Cenomanian)	Burmese amber	Myanmar	A soldier beetle belonging to the subfamily Cantharinae.	
Elektrokleinia zahradniki	Sp. nov	Valid	Fanti & Müller	Late Cretaceous (Cenomanian)	Burmese amber	Myanmar	A soldier beetle belonging to the subfamily Cantharinae.	
Falsoceratoprion fumagalliae	Sp. nov	Valid	Ferreira in Ferreira & Tettamanzi	Oligocene-Miocene	Dominican amber	Dominican Republic	A member of the family Lycidae belonging to the subfamily Lycinae and the tribe Calopterini. The type species of the genus Falsoceratoprion, which also includes an extant species Falsoceratoprion pecki.	
Helcophorus ekaterinae	Sp. nov	Valid	Kazantsev & Perkovsky	Eocene	Rovno amber	Ukraine	A member of the family Lycidae. Originally described as a species of Helcophorus, but subsequently transferred to the genus Hiekeolycus.	
Hernandochares	Gen. et comb. nov	Valid	Kirejtshuk & Prokin	Eocene	Baltic amber	Europe (Gdańsk Bay area)	A member of the family Limnichidae. The type species is "Platypelochares" electricus Hernando, Szawaryn & Ribera (2018).	
Hukawngichthyurus barsevskisi	Sp. nov	Valid	Fanti & Müller	Late Cretaceous (Cenomanian)	Burmese amber	Myanmar	A soldier beetle belonging to the subfamily Cantharinae.	
Hukawngichthyurus ditaddeoi	Sp. nov	Valid	Fanti & Müller	Late Cretaceous (Cenomanian)	Burmese amber	Myanmar	A soldier beetle belonging to the subfamily Cantharinae.	
Isorhipis muonai	Sp. nov	Valid	Alekseev & Bukejs	Eocene	Baltic amber	Europe (Baltic Sea region)	A species of Isorhipis.	
Lasiosyne integera	Sp. nov	In press	Guo et al.	Early Cretaceous	Yixian Formation	China	A member of the family Lasiosynidae.	
Lasiosyne parva	Sp. nov	In press	Guo et al.	Early Cretaceous	Yixian Formation	China	A member of the family Lasiosynidae.	
Malthodes markpankowskii	Sp. nov	Valid	Pankowski & Fanti	Eocene	Baltic amber	Russia (Kaliningrad Oblast)	A species of Malthinus.	
Malthodes masoni	Sp. nov	Valid	Pankowski & Fanti	Eocene	Baltic amber	Russia (Kaliningrad Oblast)	A species of Malthinus.	
Mantimalthinus arturi	Sp. nov	Valid	Fanti	Eocene	Baltic amber	Poland	A soldier beetle belonging to the subfamily Malthininae and the tribe Malchinini.	
Mastigocoleus	Fam. et gen. et 2 sp. nov	Valid	Tihelka & Cai in Tihelka et al.	Cretaceous (Aptian–Cenomanian)	Burmese amber	Brazil; Myanmar	A member of Dryopoidea, the type genus of the new family Mastigocoleidae Tihelka, Jäch, Kundrata & Cai. The type species is M. resinicola Tihelka & Cai; genus also includes M. rhinoceros Tihelka & Cai.	
Neusiokia	Gen. et sp. nov	Valid	Muona	Late Cretaceous	Black Creek Formation	United States (North Carolina)	A member of the family Eucnemidae belonging to the subfamily Macraulacinae. The type species is N. appalachiensis.	
Nothotytthonyx	Gen. et sp. nov	Valid	Li, Biffi, Kundrata & Cai in Li et al.	Cretaceous (Albian to Cenomanian)	Burmese amber	Myanmar	A soldier beetle. The type species is N. serratus.	
Parelateriformius grimaldii	Sp. nov	Valid	Li & Cai in Li et al.	Jurassic	Daohugou Beds	China	A member of the family Dascillidae.	
Poinarelektronmiles cuaroni	Sp. nov	Valid	Bramanti & Fanti	Late Cretaceous (Cenomanian)	Burmese amber	Myanmar	A soldier beetle. Transferred to the genus Sanaungulus by Yang, Zhao & Liu (2024).	
Ptilodactyla odnosum	Sp. nov		Telnov, Perkovsky, Kundrata & Bukejs in Telnov et al.	Eocene	Rovno amber	Ukraine	A species of Ptilodactyla.	
Sanaungulus dominikiweissbachi	Sp. nov	Valid	Fanti & Müller	Late Cretaceous (Cenomanian)	Burmese amber	Myanmar	A soldier beetle. Transferred to the genus Burmomiles by Yang, Zhao & Liu (2024).	
Sanaungulus dunlopi	Sp. nov	Valid	Fanti & Müller	Late Cretaceous (Cenomanian)	Burmese amber	Myanmar	A soldier beetle.	
Sanaungulus electrum	Sp. nov	Valid	Fanti & Müller	Late Cretaceous (Cenomanian)	Burmese amber	Myanmar	A soldier beetle.	
Sanaungulus emarginaticollis	Sp. nov	In press	Yang et al.	Cretaceous	Burmese amber	Myanmar	A soldier beetle.	
Sanaungulus franziskaeweissbachae	Sp. nov	Valid	Fanti & Müller	Late Cretaceous (Cenomanian)	Burmese amber	Myanmar	A soldier beetle.	
Sanaungulus havai	Sp. nov	Valid	Fanti & Müller	Late Cretaceous (Cenomanian)	Burmese amber	Myanmar	A soldier beetle.	
Sanaungulus imparitibius	Sp. nov	In press	Yang et al.	Cretaceous	Burmese amber	Myanmar	A soldier beetle.	
Sanaungulus kachinensis	Sp. nov	Valid	Fanti & Müller	Late Cretaceous (Cenomanian)	Burmese amber	Myanmar	A soldier beetle. Transferred to the genus Burmomiles by Yang, Zhao & Liu (2024).	
Sanaungulus kirstenaeweissbachae	Sp. nov	Valid	Fanti & Müller	Late Cretaceous (Cenomanian)	Burmese amber	Myanmar	A soldier beetle.	
Sanaungulus laticoxa	Sp. nov	In press	Yang et al.	Cretaceous	Burmese amber	Myanmar	A soldier beetle.	
Sanaungulus leniae	Sp. nov	Valid	Fanti & Müller	Late Cretaceous (Cenomanian)	Burmese amber	Myanmar	A soldier beetle.	
Sanaungulus multiramus	Sp. nov	In press	Yang et al.	Cretaceous	Burmese amber	Myanmar	A soldier beetle.	
Sanaungulus myanmaricus	Sp. nov	Valid	Fanti & Müller	Late Cretaceous (Cenomanian)	Burmese amber	Myanmar	A soldier beetle.	
Sanaungulus myitkyinaensis	Sp. nov	Valid	Fanti & Müller	Late Cretaceous (Cenomanian)	Burmese amber	Myanmar	A soldier beetle.	
Sanaungulus nalae	Sp. nov	Valid	Fanti & Müller	Late Cretaceous (Cenomanian)	Burmese amber	Myanmar	A soldier beetle.	
Sanaungulus nilsi	Sp. nov	Valid	Fanti & Müller	Late Cretaceous (Cenomanian)	Burmese amber	Myanmar	A soldier beetle.	
Sanaungulus perkovskyi	Sp. nov	Valid	Fanti & Müller	Late Cretaceous (Cenomanian)	Burmese amber	Myanmar	A soldier beetle.	
Sanaungulus peteriruedeli	Sp. nov	Valid	Fanti & Müller	Late Cretaceous (Cenomanian)	Burmese amber	Myanmar	A soldier beetle.	
Sanaungulus ruficollis	Sp. nov	In press	Yang et al.	Cretaceous	Burmese amber	Myanmar	A soldier beetle.	
Sanaungulus temporiscapsula	Sp. nov	Valid	Fanti & Müller	Late Cretaceous (Cenomanian)	Burmese amber	Myanmar	A soldier beetle.	
Sanaungulus ypogaeum	Sp. nov	Valid	Fanti & Müller	Late Cretaceous (Cenomanian)	Burmese amber	Myanmar	A soldier beetle.	
Silis (Silis) boninoi	Sp. nov	Valid	Fanti & Pankowski	Eocene	Baltic amber	Russia (Kaliningrad Oblast)	A species of Silis.	
Thambus woodruffi	Sp. nov	Valid	Muona	Cenozoic (20 to 40 million years old)	Dominican amber	Dominican Republic	A member of the family Eucnemidae belonging to the subfamily Macraulacinae.	
Tytthonyx milleri	Sp. nov	Valid	Ivie, Fanti & Ferreira	Miocene	Dominican amber	Dominican Republic	A species of Tytthonyx.	
Varcalium	Gen. et sp. nov	Valid	Li, Ruta, Tihelka & Cai in Li et al.	Cretaceous (Albian-Cenomanian)	Burmese amber	Myanmar	A member of the family Scirtidae. The type species is V. lawrencei.	
Vetubrachypsectra huchengi	Sp. nov	Valid	Li, Kundrata & Cai in Li et al.	Cretaceous (Albian to Cenomanian)	Burmese amber	Myanmar	A member of the family Brachypsectridae.	
Vitalfranzius	Gen. et 2 sp. nov	Valid	Fanti & Müller	Late Cretaceous (Cenomanian)	Burmese amber	Myanmar	A soldier beetle. The type species is V. burmiticus; genus also includes V. cretaceus.	

====== Elateriform research ======
- The first fossil larva of a representative of Elmidae reported to date is described from the Eocene Baltic amber by Zippel et al. (2022).

===== Scarabaeiformia =====
====== New taxa ======
Name	Novelty	Status	Authors	Age	Type locality	Country	Notes	Images
Anisoodontus	Gen. et 2 sp. nov	In press	Wu et al.	Cretaceous	Burmese amber	Myanmar	A stag beetle. Genus includes new species A. qizhihaoi and A. xiafangyuani.	
Ceratocanthus huarongii	Sp. nov	Valid	Lu, Ballerio & Bai in Lu et al.	Miocene	Dominican amber	Dominican Republic	A species of Ceratocanthus.	
Litholamprima qizhihaoi	Sp. nov	In press	Jiang et al.	Early Cretaceous	Yixian Formation	China	A stag beetle.	
Nesopalla succini	Sp. nov	Valid	Lu, Ballerio & Bai in Lu et al.	Miocene	Dominican amber	Dominican Republic	A member of the family Hybosoridae belonging to the subfamily Ceratocanthinae.	
Palaeopycnus	Gen. et 2 sp. nov	Valid	Lu, Ballerio & Bai in Lu et al.	Cretaceous	Burmese amber	Myanmar	A member of the family Hybosoridae belonging to the subfamily Ceratocanthinae. The type species is P. circus; genus also includes P. fushengii.	
Prolucanus	Gen. et sp. nov		Qi et al.	Early Cretaceous	Yixian Formation	China	A stag beetle. The type species is P. beipiaoensis.	

====== Scarabaeiform research ======
- Cretaceous scarabaeoid Mesoceratocanthus, originally assigned to the family Hybosoridae, is reinterpreted as a member of the passaloid lineage including the families Passalopalpidae and Passalidae (probably closely related to the extinct family Passalopalpidae) by Li et al. (2022).

===== Staphyliniformia =====
====== New taxa ======
Name	Novelty	Status	Authors	Age	Type locality	Country	Notes	Images
Afristenus	Gen. et sp. nov		Mnguni, McKay & Badenhorst	Late Cretaceous (probably Turonian)		Botswana	A rove beetle belonging to the family Steninae. The type species is A. orapensis.	
Amplectister terapoides	Sp. nov		Yamamoto & Caterino	Cretaceous (Albian–Cenomanian)	Burmese amber	Myanmar	A member of the family Histeridae.	
Anapleus kachinensis	Sp. nov	Valid	Jiang, Caterino & Chen	Late Cretaceous (Cenomanian)	Burmese amber	Myanmar	A species of Anapleus.	
Angucharcotes	Gen. et sp. nov		Li et al.	Cretaceous	Burmese amber	Myanmar	A rove beetle belonging to the subfamily Phloeocharinae. Genus includes new species A. thayerae.	
Coomania enkarsios	Sp. nov	Valid	Jenkins Shaw et al.	Late Cretaceous (Cenomanian)	Burmese amber	Myanmar	A rove beetle belonging to the subfamily Coomaniinae.	
Coomania megistos	Sp. nov	Valid	Jenkins Shaw et al.	Late Cretaceous (Cenomanian)	Burmese amber	Myanmar	A rove beetle belonging to the subfamily Coomaniinae.	
Coomania yini	Sp. nov	Valid	Jenkins Shaw et al.	Late Cretaceous (Cenomanian)	Burmese amber	Myanmar	A rove beetle belonging to the subfamily Coomaniinae.	
Crenossidium	Gen. et sp. nov	Valid	Li, Newton & Cai in Li et al.	Cretaceous (Albian to Cenomanian)	Burmese amber	Myanmar	A member of the family Ptiliidae. The type species is C. slipinskii.	
Cretaceonanobius	Gen. et sp. nov	Valid	Liu et al.	Early Cretaceous	Yixian Formation	China	A rove beetle belonging to the subfamily Pseudopsinae. The type species is C. fossilis.	
Derolathrus capdoliensis	Sp. nov	Valid	Tihelka et al.	Cretaceous (Albian-Cenomanian)	Charentese amber	France	A species of Derolathrus.	
Europharinodes	Gen. et sp. nov	Valid	Yin & Cai in Yin et al.	Eocene	Baltic amber	Russia (Kaliningrad Oblast)	A rove beetle belonging to the subfamily Pselaphinae and the tribe Hybocephalini. The type species is E. schaufussi.	
Pareburniola	Gen. et sp. nov	Valid	Zilberman, Yin & Cai	Miocene	Dominican amber	Dominican Republic	A rove beetle belonging to the subfamily Aleocharinae and the tribe Corotocini. The type species is P. dominicana.	
Priochirus trisclerite	Sp. nov	Valid	Peng et al.	Late Cretaceous (Cenomanian)	Burmese amber	Myanmar	A species of Priochirus.	
Yprezethinus	Gen. et sp. nov	Valid	Parker	Eocene (Ypresian)	Cambay amber	India	A rove beetle belonging to the subfamily Pselaphinae and the tribe Bythinoplectini. The type species is Y. grimaldii.	

====== Staphyliniform research ======
- A larva of an ant-like stone beetle, similar to the second stage larvae of extant Stenomastigus longicornis and likely belonging to the group Mastigini, is described from the Cretaceous amber from Myanmar by Haug et al. (2022).

== Clade Dictyoptera ==
=== New taxa ===
Name	Novelty	Status	Authors	Age	Type locality	Country	Notes	Images
Alienopterix santonicus	Sp. nov	Valid	Szabó et al.	Late Cretaceous (Santonian)	Ajka Coal Formation	Hungary	A member of the family Alienopteridae.	
Anisotermes bourguignoni	Sp. nov		Jouault et al.	Cretaceous		Myanmar	A termite.	
Bimini	Gen. et sp. nov		Vršanský in Vršanský et al.	Late Jurassic		Russia	A cockroach belonging to the family Corydiidae. Genus includes new species B. gorevoesis	
Corydoblatta	Gen. et sp. nov		Hinkelman & Vršanský in Vršanský et al.	Late Cretaceous (Cenomanian)	Burmese amber	Myanmar	A cockroach belonging to the family Corydiidae. Genus includes new species C. subrotunda.	
Cryptotermes pouilloni	Sp. nov	Valid	Jouault & Nel	Miocene	Dominican amber	Dominican Republic	A termite, a species of Cryptotermes.	
Facioblatta	Gen. et sp. nov	Valid	Hinkelman	Late Cretaceous (Cenomanian)	Burmese amber	Myanmar	A cockroach belonging to the family Liberiblattinidae. Genus includes new species F. perfidia.	
Hypercercoula	Gen. et sp. nov	In press	Qiu	Cretaceous	Burmese amber	Myanmar	A member of Blattoidea. Genus includes new species H. jiewenae.	
Litaneutria pilosuspedes	Sp. nov	Valid	Terríquez-Beltrán, Riquelme & Varela-Hernández	Miocene	Mexican amber	Mexico	An amelid mantis, a species of Litaneutria.	
Longitermes	Gen. et sp. nov		Jouault et al.	Cretaceous		Myanmar	A termite. Genus includes new species L. pulcher.	
Magnifitermes	Gen. et sp. nov		Jouault et al.	Cretaceous		Myanmar	A termite. Genus includes new species M. krishnai.	
Magniocula paradoxona	Sp. nov		Vršanská & Vršanský in Vršanský et al.	Late Cretaceous (Cenomanian)	Burmese amber	Myanmar	A cockroach belonging to the family Corydiidae.	
Manipulatoides	Gen. et sp. nov	Valid	Li & Huang	Cretaceous (Albian-Cenomanian)	Burmese amber	Myanmar	A member of the family Manipulatoridae. The type species is M. obscura.	
Mastotermes myanmarensis	Sp. nov		Jouault et al.	Cretaceous		Myanmar	A termite, a species of Mastotermes.	
Mesoblattina libanensis	Sp. nov	Valid	Káčerová & Azar	Early Cretaceous		Lebanon	A cockroach belonging to the family Mesoblattinidae.	
Nuurcala coloris	Sp. nov	Valid	Kováčová	Early Cretaceous	Dzun-Bain Formation	Mongolia	A cockroach belonging to the family Caloblattinidae.	
Obscuroblatta	Gen. et sp. nov		Hinkelman & Vršanský in Vršanský et al.	Late Cretaceous (Cenomanian)	Burmese amber	Myanmar	A cockroach belonging to the family Corydiidae. Genus includes new species O. rigida.	
?Ocelloblattula striata	Sp. nov	Valid	Káčerová & Azar	Early Cretaceous		Lebanon	A cockroach belonging to the group Corydioidea and the family Blattulidae.	
Okruhliak	Gen. et sp. nov		Vršanský & Hinkelman in Vršanský et al.	Mesozoic			A cockroach belonging to the family Corydiidae. Genus includes new species O. vedec.	
Perlucipecta lacrima	Sp. nov	Valid	Vršanský & Sendi	Late Cretaceous (Cenomanian)	Burmese amber	Myanmar	A member of the family Mesoblattinidae.	
Piloscutumus	Gen. et sp. nov		Sendi in Vršanský et al.	Late Cretaceous (Cenomanian)	Burmese amber	Myanmar	A cockroach belonging to the family Corydiidae. Genus includes new species P. discretus.	
Pokemon	Gen. et sp. nov		Vršanská, Hinkelman & Vršanský in Vršanský et al.	Late Cretaceous (Cenomanian)	Burmese amber	Myanmar	A cockroach belonging to the family Corydiidae. Genus includes new species P. oculiapertion.	
Poroblattina anadiensis	Sp. nov	In press	Correia et al.	Carboniferous (Gzhelian)	Buçaco Carboniferous Basin	Portugal	A roachoid belonging to the family Poroblattinidae.	
Pozabudnutie	Gen. et 2 sp. nov	Valid	Vršanský, Hinkelman & Aristov in Vršanský et al.	Permian to Cretaceous		Myanmar; Russia	Originally described as phyloblattid cockroach; Nel, Garrouste & Jouault (2023) considered the type species to be a member of Dictyoptera of uncertain family affinities. The type species is P. antiquorum Hinkelman & Vršanský from the Cretaceous Burmese amber; genus also includes P. anakitensis Vršanský & Aristov from the Permian of Anakit, Russia.	
Sclerotermes	Gen. et sp. nov	Valid	Jouault & Nam	Early Cretaceous (Albian)	Jinju Formation	South Korea	A termite. Genus includes new species S. samsiki.	
Sosnowiecia	Gen. et sp. nov	Valid	Dvořák, Krzemiński & Prokop	Carboniferous (Westphalian A)		Poland	A representative of the stem group of Dictyoptera with resemblance to "blattoid" lines Dictyoptera (Blattodea + Mantodea) and Paoliida, possibly a member of the family Mesorthopteridae. The type species is S. dareki.	
Squamicaputa	Gen. et sp. nov		Hinkelman & Koubová in Vršanský et al.	Late Cretaceous (Cenomanian)	Burmese amber	Myanmar	A cockroach belonging to the family Corydiidae. Genus includes new species S. tubulosa.	
Supella dominicana	Sp. nov	Valid	Poinar	Miocene	Dominican amber	Dominican Republic	An ectobiid cockroach, a species of Supella.	
Valkyritermes	Gen. et sp. nov	Valid	Jouault, Engel & Nel in Jouault et al.	Cretaceous (Albian to Cenomanian)	Burmese amber	Myanmar	A termite belonging to the family Kalotermitidae. The type species is V. inopinatus.	
Vitisma okata	Sp. nov	Valid	Kováčová	Early Cretaceous	Dzun-Bain Formation	Mongolia	A member of the family Umenocoleidae.	

=== Dictyopteran research ===
- An assemblage of specimens of Subioblatta madygenica, with several specimens preserving the coloration on wings, is described from the Triassic Madygen Formation (Kyrgyzstan) by Hinkelman (2022).
- Probable termite coprolites with different proportions are described from the Lower Cretaceous Huolinhe Formation (Huolinhe Basin, China) by Dong et al. (2022), who interpret this finding as indicating that the Early Cretaceous termites from the Huolinhe Basin had wood-feeding habits, and suggesting that the division of labor among termites already existed in the Early Cretaceous.
- Borings filled with coprolites similar to those produced by extant termites belonging to the family Kalotermitidae are described from silicified conifer woods from the Albian Kachaike Formation (Argentina) by Greppi et al. (2022), who interpret the presence of kalotermitids as indicative of arid climatic conditions.

== †Glosselytrodea ==
Name	Novelty	Status	Authors	Age	Type locality	Location	Notes	Images
Moscheloptera	Gen. et sp. nov	Valid	Pérez-de la Fuente, Nel & Poschmann	Permian (Asselian–?Sakmarian)	Meisenheim Formation	Germany	A member of Glosselytrodea belonging to the family Permoberothidae. The type species is M. phantasma.	

== Hymenopterans ==
=== "Symphyta" ===
==== New taxa ====
Name	Novelty	Status	Authors	Age	Type locality	Location	Notes	Images
Brachyoxyela conjunctiva	Sp. nov	In press	Dai et al.	Early Cretaceous	Yixian Formation	China	A member of the family Xyelidae belonging to the subfamily Macroxyelinae and the tribe Macroxyelini.	
Brachyoxyela elliptica	Sp. nov	In press	Dai et al.	Early Cretaceous	Yixian Formation	China	A member of the family Xyelidae belonging to the subfamily Macroxyelinae and the tribe Macroxyelini.	
Brachyoxyela leei	Sp. nov	In press	Dai et al.	Early Cretaceous	Yixian Formation	China	A member of the family Xyelidae belonging to the subfamily Macroxyelinae and the tribe Macroxyelini.	
Curvitexis	Gen. et sp. nov		Jouault, Nam & Rasnitsyn	Cretaceous	Burmese amber	Myanmar	A member of the family Anaxyelidae. Genus includes new species C. kopylovi.	
Dolicholyda	Gen. et 3 sp. nov	Valid	Zhuang, Rasnitsyn, Shih & Wang in Zhuang et al.	Early Cretaceous	Yixian Formation	China	A member of the family Pamphiliidae belonging to the subfamily Juralydinae. The type species is D. obtusata; genus also includes D. angusta and D. confluens.	
Emphytus miocenicus	Sp. nov	Valid	Nel et al.	Miocene		France	An Allantinae Tenthredinid sawfly.	
Empria sammuti	Sp. nov	Valid	Nel et al.	Miocene		France	An Empria species Tenthredinid sawfly.	
Eourocerus	Gen. et sp. nov	Valid	Archibald & Rasnitsyn	Early Eocene	Klondike Mountain Formation	United States (Washington)	A horntail. The type species is E. anguliterreus.	Eourocerus anguliterreus
Eutomostethus karimae	Sp. nov	Valid	Nel, Niu & Wei	Eocene	Green River Formation	United States (Colorado)	A species of Eutomostethus.	
Evacuxyela	Gen. et 2 sp. nov	Valid	Dai et al.	Middle Jurassic	Jiulongshan Formation	China	A member of the family Xyelidae belonging to the subfamily Macroxyelinae and the tribe Angaridyellini. Genus includes new species E. conflata and E. hsiaoae.	
Leptoxyela	Gen. et sp. nov	Valid	Dai, Rasnitsyn & Wang in Dai et al.	Early Cretaceous	Yixian Formation	China	A member of the family Xyelidae belonging to the subfamily Macroxyelinae and the tribe Angaridyelini. The type species is L. eximia.	
Paleonematus	Gen. et sp. nov	Valid	Nel	Paleocene		France	A member of the family Tenthredinidae belonging to the subfamily Nematinae. The type species is P. jarzembowskii.	
Paraxiphydria	Gen. et sp. nov	Valid	Gao, Engel & Gao in Gao et al.	Late Cretaceous (Cenomanian)	Burmese amber	Myanmar	A member of the family Xiphydriidae or Anaxyelidae. The type species is P. resinata.	
Scabolyda latusa	Sp. nov	Valid	Zhuang et al.	Middle Jurassic (Callovian)	Jiulongshan Formation	China	A member of the family Pamphiliidae.	
Scabolyda tenuis	Sp. nov	Valid	Zhuang et al.	Early Cretaceous	Yixian Formation	China	A member of the family Pamphiliidae.	
Scleroxyela cephalota	Sp. nov	Valid	Dai, Rasnitsyn Shih & Wang in Dai et al.	Middle Jurassic (Callovian)	Jiulongshan Formation	China	A member of the family Xyelidae belonging to the subfamily Macroxyelinae and the tribe Xyeleciini.	

==== "Symphytan" research ====
- A study on the phylogenetic affinities of the Oligocene pamphiliid Tapholyda caplani is published by Jouault et al. (2022), who transfer this species to the subfamily Juralydinae.

=== Apocrita ===
==== Apoidea ====
Name	Novelty	Status	Authors	Age	Type locality	Location	Notes	Images
Angarosphex ryonsangiensis	Sp. nov		Ri et al.	Early Cretaceous (Barremian–Aptian)	Sinuiju Formation	North Korea	A member of the family Angarosphecidae.	
Dactylurina aethiopica	Sp. nov	Valid	Lepeco & Melo	Miocene	Ethiopian amber	Ethiopia	A stingless bee. Originally described as a species of Dactylurina, but subsequently made the type species of the separate genus Adactylurina.	
Exallopterus	Gen. et sp. nov	In press	Rosa, Melo & Ribeiro	Early Cretaceous (Aptian)	Crato Formation	Brazil	A member of the family Crabronidae. Genus includes new species E. spectabilis.	
Heterosphex	Gen. et sp. nov	In press	Li, Rosa, Melo & Shih in Li et al.	Cretaceous	Burmese amber	Myanmar	A member of the family Cirrosphecidae. Genus includes species is H. wuni.	
Liotrigona aethiopica	Sp. nov	Valid	Engel in Engel & Aber	Miocene	Ethiopian amber	Ethiopia	A stingless bee.	
Pompilopterus sinuijuensis	Sp. nov		Ri et al.	Early Cretaceous (Barremian–Aptian)	Sinuiju Formation	North Korea	A member of the family Angarosphecidae.	

==== Chalcidoidea ====
Name	Novelty	Status	Authors	Age	Type locality	Location	Notes	Images
Archaeocercoides	Gen. et sp. nov	Valid	Simutnik in Simutnik et al.	Eocene	Rovno amber	Ukraine	A member of the family Encyrtidae. The type species is A. puchkovi.	
Balticalcarus	Gen. et sp. nov	Valid	Simutnik in Simutnik, Perkovsky & Vasilenko	Eocene	Baltic amber	Russia (Kaliningrad Oblast)	A member of the family Encyrtidae belonging to the subfamily Tetracneminae. The type species is B. archibaldi.	
Electronoyesella	Gen. et sp. nov	Valid	Simutnik in Simutnik, Perkovsky & Vasilenko	Eocene	Rovno amber	Ukraine	A member of the family Encyrtidae belonging to the subfamily Tetracneminae. The type species is E. antiqua.	
Protaphycus	Gen. et sp. nov	Valid	Simutnik in Simutnik, Perkovsky & Vasilenko	Eocene	Rovno amber	Ukraine	A member of the family Encyrtidae belonging to the subfamily Encyrtinae. The type species is P. shuvalikovi.	
Rovnopositor	Gen. et sp. nov	Valid	Simutnik in Simutnik et al.	Eocene	Rovno amber	Ukraine	A member of the family Encyrtidae. The type species is R. voblenkoi.	

==== Chrysidoidea ====
Name	Novelty	Status	Authors	Age	Type locality	Location	Notes	Images
Acanthabythus	Gen. et sp. nov	In press	Lepeco & Melo	Cretaceous	Burmese amber	Myanmar	A member of the family Scolebythidae. Genus includes new species A. exilispineus.	
Ajkanesia	Gen. et sp. nov	In press	Szabó & Brazidec in Szabó et al.	Late Cretaceous (Santonian)	Ajka Coal Formation	Hungary	A member of the family Bethylidae belonging to the subfamily Pristocerinae. The type species is A. harmincipsziloni.	
Alongatepyris pedrocai	Sp. nov	Valid	Colombo & Azevedo in Colombo, Perkovsky & Azevedo	Miocene	Dominican amber	Dominican Republic	A member of the family Bethylidae.	
Amissidigitus	Gen. et sp. nov	In press	Szabó & Brazidec in Szabó et al.	Late Cretaceous (Santonian)	Ajka Coal Formation	Hungary	A member of the family Bethylidae belonging to the subfamily Scleroderminae. The type species is A. belai.	
Arcapenesia	Gen. et sp. nov	In press	Lepeco & Melo	Cretaceous	Burmese amber	Myanmar	A member of the family Scolebythidae. Genus includes new species A. compacta.	
Bakeriella nanyhelae	Sp. nov	In press	Brazidec & Perrichot	Miocene	Mexican amber	Mexico	A member of the family Bethylidae belonging to the subfamily Epyrinae.	
Bocchus rex	Sp. nov	Valid	Olmi et al.	Eocene	Rovno amber	Ukraine	A member of the family Dryinidae.	
Burmapenesia	Gen. et 2 sp. nov	In press	Lepeco & Melo	Cretaceous	Burmese amber	Myanmar	A member of the family Scolebythidae. Genus includes new species B. iridescens and B. longicephala.	
Cephalobythus	Gen. et 4 sp. nov	In press	Lepeco & Melo	Cretaceous	Burmese amber	Myanmar	A member of the family Scolebythidae. Genus includes new species C. clypeatus, C. deformis, C. gladiator and C. simplex.	
Cretopsenella	Gen. et sp. nov	In press	Lepeco & Melo	Cretaceous	Burmese amber	Myanmar	A member of the family Scolebythidae. Genus includes new species C. spinifera.	
Dryinus carsteni	Sp. nov	Valid	Olmi et al.	Cretaceous	Burmese amber	Myanmar	A species of Dryinus.	
Gnathapenesia	Gen. et sp. nov	In press	Lepeco & Melo	Cretaceous	Burmese amber	Myanmar	A member of the family Scolebythidae. Genus includes new species G. burmensis.	
Goniozus cotyi	Sp. nov	In press	Brazidec & Perrichot	Miocene	Mexican amber	Mexico	A species of Goniozus.	
Hedychridium rosai	Sp. nov		Brazidec & Perrichot	Miocene	Zhangpu amber	China	Originally described as a species of Hedychridium; subsequently transferred to the genus Atoposega in the cuckoo wasp subfamily Amiseginae by Brazidec, Rosa & Perrichot (2024).	
Neophenax	Gen. et sp. nov	Valid	Engel	Late Cretaceous (Turonian)	New Jersey amber	United States (New Jersey)	A member of the family Falsiformicidae. Genus includes new species N. orcus.	
Parascleroderma palaeosinica	Sp. nov	In press	Brazidec & Perrichot	Miocene	Zhangpu amber	China	A member of the family Bethylidae.	
Rhynchopsenella	Gen. et 3 sp. nov	In press	Lepeco & Melo	Cretaceous	Burmese amber	Myanmar	A member of the family Scolebythidae. Genus includes new species R. argentea, R. bicarinata and R. diaphana.	
Rovnodryinus	Gen. et sp. nov	Valid	Olmi et al.	Eocene	Rovno amber	Ukraine	A member of the family Dryinidae belonging to the subfamily Apodryininae. Genus includes new species R. khomychi.	
Sierola colomboi	Sp. nov		Brazidec & Perrichot	Miocene	Zhangpu amber	China	A member of the family Bethylidae.	
Solepyris electromexicanus	Sp. nov	In press	Brazidec & Perrichot	Miocene	Mexican amber	Mexico	A member of the family Bethylidae belonging to the subfamily Scleroderminae.	
Voronknoxus	Gen. et sp. nov	Valid	Colombo & Perkovsky in Colombo, Perkovsky & Vasilenko	Eocene	Rovno amber	Ukraine	A Scleroderminae Bethylid wasp. The type species is V. zerovae.	

==== Diaprioidea ====
Name	Novelty	Status	Authors	Age	Type locality	Location	Notes	Images
Basalys villumi	Sp. nov	Valid	Brazidec & Vilhelmsen	Eocene	Blue Earth Formation (Baltic amber)	Europe (Baltic Sea region)	A member of the family Diapriidae, originally assigned to the subfamily Diapriinae; moved to the subfamily Ambositrinae and to the genus Ambositra by Chemyreva, Vasilenko & Perkovsky (2024).	
Belyta knudhoejgaardi	Sp. nov	Valid	Brazidec & Vilhelmsen	Eocene	Blue Earth Formation (Baltic amber)	Europe (Baltic Sea region)	A species of Belyta.	
Cinetus breviscapus	Sp. nov	Valid	Brazidec & Vilhelmsen	Eocene	Blue Earth Formation (Baltic amber)	Europe (Baltic Sea region)	A member of the family Diapriidae belonging to the subfamily Belytinae.	
Cinetus elongatus	Sp. nov	Valid	Brazidec & Vilhelmsen	Eocene	Blue Earth Formation (Baltic amber)	Europe (Baltic Sea region)	A member of the family Diapriidae belonging to the subfamily Belytinae.	
Doliopria baltica	Sp. nov	Valid	Brazidec & Vilhelmsen	Eocene	Blue Earth Formation (Baltic amber)	Europe (Baltic Sea region)	A member of the family Diapriidae belonging to the subfamily Diapriinae.	
Pantoclis globosa	Sp. nov	Valid	Brazidec & Vilhelmsen	Eocene	Blue Earth Formation (Baltic amber)	Europe (Baltic Sea region)	A member of the family Diapriidae belonging to the subfamily Belytinae.	
Pantolyta augustinusii	Sp. nov	Valid	Brazidec & Vilhelmsen	Eocene	Blue Earth Formation (Baltic amber)	Europe (Baltic Sea region)	A member of the family Diapriidae belonging to the subfamily Belytinae.	
Pantolyta chemyrevae	Sp. nov	Valid	Brazidec & Vilhelmsen	Eocene	Blue Earth Formation (Baltic amber)	Europe (Baltic Sea region)	A member of the family Diapriidae belonging to the subfamily Belytinae.	
Pantolyta similis	Sp. nov	Valid	Brazidec & Vilhelmsen	Eocene	Blue Earth Formation (Baltic amber)	Europe (Baltic Sea region)	A member of the family Diapriidae belonging to the subfamily Belytinae.	
Spathiopteryx soosi	Sp. nov	In press	Szabó, Brazidec & Perrichot in Szabó et al.	Late Cretaceous (Santonian)	Ajka Coal Formation	Hungary	A member of the family Spathiopterygidae.	
Spilomicrus succinalis	Sp. nov	Valid	Brazidec & Vilhelmsen	Eocene	Blue Earth Formation (Baltic amber)	Europe (Baltic Sea region)	A species of Spilomicrus.	

==== Evanioidea ====
Name	Novelty	Status	Authors	Age	Type locality	Location	Notes	Images
Nevania deviata	Sp. nov		Li et al.	Middle Jurassic	Haifanggou Formation	China	A member of the family Praeaulacidae.	
Praeaulacon grossus	Sp. nov		Li et al.	Middle Jurassic	Haifanggou Formation	China	A member of the family Praeaulacidae.	
Pristaulacus jarzembowskii	Sp. nov	Valid	Jouault & Nel	Paleocene		France	A species of Pristaulacus.	

==== Formicoidea ====
Name	Novelty	Status	Authors	Age	Type locality	Location	Notes	Images
Camponotus parvus	Sp. nov	Valid	Perfilieva	Oligocene		Russia	A carpenter ant.	
Desyopone	Gen. et sp. nov	Valid	Boudinot & Perrichot in Boudinot et al.	Miocene	Ethiopian amber	Ethiopia	An ant belonging to the subfamily Ponerinae and the tribe Ponerini. The type species is D. hereon.	
Emplastus amguensis	Sp. nov	Valid	Perfilieva	Oligocene		Russia	An ant, a species of Emplastus.	
Emplastus obliquus	Sp. nov	Valid	Perfilieva	Oligocene		Russia	An ant, a species of Emplastus.	
Emplastus similis	Sp. nov	Valid	Perfilieva	Oligocene		Russia	An ant, a species of Emplastus.	
Gerontoformica sternorhabda	Sp. nov	Valid	Boudinot et al.	Cretaceous	Burmese amber	Myanmar	An ant, a member of the subfamily Sphecomyrminae.	
Lasius vulgaris	Sp. nov	Valid	Perfilieva	Oligocene		Russia	An ant, a species of Lasius.	
Manica andrannae	Sp. nov		Zharkov & Dubovikoff in Zharkov, Dubovikoff & Abakumov	Eocene (Priabonian)	Prussian Formation (Baltic amber)	Russia (Kaliningrad Oblast)	A species of Manica.	Manica andrannae
Odontoponera pseudotransversa	Sp. nov		Perrichot	Miocene	Zhangpu amber	China	A species of Odontoponera.	
Paraphaenogaster ussuriensis	Sp. nov	Valid	Perfilieva	Oligocene		Russia	An ant belonging to the subfamily Myrmicinae.	
Ravavy goldmani	Sp. nov		Boudinot & Perrichot in Perrichot et al.	Miocene	Ethiopian amber	Ethiopia	An ant, a species of Ravavy.	
Schismiscapus	Gen. et sp. nov	In press	Varela-Hernández et al.	Miocene	Mexican amber	Mexico	An ant belonging to the subfamily Dolichoderinae. The type species is S. exstinctum.	
Sussudio	Gen. et comb. nov	Valid	Boudinot, Borowiec & Prebus	Eocene	Baltic amber	Europe (Baltic Sea region)	A Formicinae ant of uncertain affinities. A new genus for "Pseudolasius" boreus Wheeler (1915).	
Technomyrmex kemaensis	Sp. nov	Valid	Perfilieva	Oligocene		Russia	An ant, a species of Technomyrmex.	
Technomyrmex svojtkai	Sp. nov		Perrichot & Engel in Perrichot et al.	Miocene	Ethiopian amber	Ethiopia	An ant, a species of Technomyrmex.	

==== Ichneumonoidea ====
Name	Novelty	Status	Authors	Age	Type locality	Location	Notes	Images
Acerataspis? revelata	Comb. nov	Valid	Brues	Eocene (Chadronian)	Florissant Formation	United States (Colorado)	A metopiine Darwin wasp. Moved from Pimpla revelata (1910)	
Armadilleon	Gen. et 2 comb. nov	Valid	Spasojevic, Broad & Klopfstein	Eocene (Chadronian)	Florissant Formation	United States (Colorado)	A phygadeuontine Darwin wasp. The type species is "Pimpla" morticina Brues (1910); Additionally includes "Polysphincta" petrorum Brues (1910).	
Crusopimpla collina	Sp. nov	Valid	Klopfstein	Eocene (Ypresian)	Fur Formation	Denmark	A member of the family Ichneumonidae belonging to the subfamily Pimplinae.	
Crusopimpla? elongata	Sp. nov	Valid	Klopfstein	Eocene (Ypresian)	Fur Formation	Denmark	A member of the family Ichneumonidae belonging to the subfamily Pimplinae.	
Crusopimpla minuta	Sp. nov	Valid	Klopfstein	Eocene (Ypresian)	Fur Formation	Denmark	A member of the family Ichneumonidae belonging to the subfamily Pimplinae.	
Crusopimpla rettigi	Sp. nov	Valid	Klopfstein	Eocene (Ypresian)	Fur Formation	Denmark	A member of the family Ichneumonidae belonging to the subfamily Pimplinae.	
Crusopimpla violina	Sp. nov	Valid	Klopfstein	Eocene (Ypresian)	Fur Formation	Denmark	A member of the family Ichneumonidae belonging to the subfamily Pimplinae.	
Crusopimpla weltii	Sp. nov	Valid	Viertler, Spasojevic & Klopfstein in Viertler et al.	Eocene (Ypresian)	Fur Formation	Denmark	A member of the family Ichneumonidae belonging to the subfamily Pimplinae.	
Dimophora? longicornis	Comb. nov	Valid	Theobald	Oligocene (Chattian)	Aix-en-Provence Formation	France (Provence-Alpes-Côte d'Azur)	A cremastine Darwin wasp. Moved from Nemeritis longicornis (1937)	
Dimophora? wickhami	Comb. nov	Valid	Cockerell	Eocene (Chadronian)	Florissant Formation	United States (Colorado)	A cremastine Darwin wasp. Moved from Theronia wickhami (1919)	
Ebriosa	Gen. et sp. nov	Valid	Viertler, Spasojevic & Klopfstein in Viertler et al.	Eocene (Ypresian)	Fur Formation	Denmark	A member of the family Ichneumonidae, possibly belonging to the subfamily Ctenopelmatinae. The type species is E. flava.	
Entypoma? duergari	Sp. nov	Valid	Viertler, Spasojevic & Klopfstein in Viertler et al.	Eocene (Ypresian)	Fur Formation	Denmark	A member of the family Ichneumonidae belonging to the subfamily Orthocentrinae, possibly a species of Entypoma.	
Hallocinetus? arvernus	Comb. nov	Valid	Piton	Paleocene (Thanetian)	Menat Formation	France (Puy-de-Dôme)	A possible Acaenitine Darwin wasp. Moved from Phaenolobus arvernus (1940)	
Hypsicera? solidata	Comb. nov	Valid	Brues	Eocene (Chadronian)	Florissant Formation	United States (Colorado)	A metopiine Darwin wasp. Moved from Camerotops solidatus (1910)	
Lathrolestes? zlatorog	Sp. nov	Valid	Viertler, Spasojevic & Klopfstein in Viertler et al.	Eocene (Ypresian)	Fur Formation	Denmark	A member of the family Ichneumonidae, possibly belonging to the subfamily Ctenopelmatinae and to the genus Lathrolestes.	
Lithoserix antiquus	Comb. nov	Valid	Saussure	Oligocene (Chattian)	Aix-en-Provence Formation	France (Provence-Alpes-Côte d'Azur)	A cremastine Darwin wasp. Moved from Pimpla antiqua (1852)	
Lycorina? indura	Comb. nov	Valid	Theobald	Oligocene (Rupelian)	Kleinkembs Formation	Germany (Baden)	A possible lycorinine Darwin wasp. Moved from Pimpla indura (1937); Listed as Kleinkembs, Pays de Bade, Haut-Rhin, France by Spasojevic, Broad & Klopfstein 2022	
Madma	Gen. et sp. nov	Valid	Viertler et al.	Eocene	Oise amber	France	A member of the family Ichneumonidae belonging to the subfamily Phygadeuontinae. The type species is M. oisella.	
Monoblastus? senilis	Comb. nov	Valid	Brues	Eocene (Chadronian)	Florissant Formation	United States (Colorado)	A tryphonine Darwin wasp. Moved from Pimpla senilis (1910)	
Orthocentrus? mortuaria	Comb. nov	Valid	Brues	Eocene (Chadronian)	Florissant Formation	United States (Colorado)	An orthocentrine Darwin wasp. Moved from Polysphincta mortuaria (1910)	
Palaeorionis	Gen. et sp. nov	Valid	Belokobylskij & Hovorka	Miocene	Dominican amber	Dominican Republic	A member of the family Braconidae belonging to the subfamily Euphorinae. The type species is P. longicaudis.	
Pappous	Gen. et sp. nov	Valid	Viertler et al.	Eocene	Oise amber	France	A member of the family Ichneumonidae, possibly belonging to the subfamily Tryphoninae. The type species is P. trichomatius.	
Pherhombus parvulus	Sp. nov	Valid	Meier, Wacker & Klopfstein	Eocene (Ypresian)	Fur Formation	Denmark	A member of the family Ichneumonidae belonging to the subfamily Pherhombinae. Originally described as a species of Pherhombus, but subsequently transferred to the genus Furpherhombus.	
Protoctonus	Gen. et sp. nov	Valid	Davidian in Davidian, Manukyan & Belokobylskij	Eocene	Prussian Formation (Baltic amber)	Russia (Kaliningrad Oblast)	A member of the family Braconidae belonging to the subfamily Aphidiinae. The type species is P. groehni.	
Theronia? furensis	Sp. nov	Valid	Klopfstein	Eocene (Ypresian)	Fur Formation	Denmark	Possibly a species of Theronia.	
Theronia? nigriscutum	Sp. nov	Valid	Klopfstein	Eocene (Ypresian)	Fur Formation	Denmark	Possibly a species of Theronia.	
Triclistus bibori	Sp. nov	Valid	Viertler, Spasojevic & Klopfstein in Viertler et al.	Eocene (Ypresian)	Fur Formation	Denmark	A member of the family Ichneumonidae belonging to the subfamily Metopiinae, a species of Triclistus.	
Utrillabracon	Gen. et sp. nov	Valid	Álvarez-Parra & Engel in Álvarez-Parra et al.	Early Cretaceous (Albian)	Escucha Formation	Spain	A member of the family Braconidae belonging to the subfamily Protorhyssalinae. The type species is U. electropteron.	
Xanthopimpla ciboisae	Sp. nov	Valid	Klopfstein	Eocene (Ypresian)	Fur Formation	Denmark	A species of Xanthopimpla.	
Xanthopimpla crescendae	Sp. nov	Valid	Klopfstein	Eocene (Ypresian)	Fur Formation	Denmark	A species of Xanthopimpla.	
Xorides sejugatus	Comb. nov	Valid	Brues	Eocene (Chadronian)	Florissant Formation	United States (Colorado)	An orthocentrine Darwin wasp. Moved from Xylonomus sejugatus (1910)	
Zagryphus tilloyi	Comb. nov	Valid	Theobald	Oligocene (Chattian)	Aix-en-Provence Formation	France (Provence-Alpes-Côte d'Azur)	A tryphonine Darwin wasp. Moved from Promethes tilloyi (1937)	

==== Mymarommatoidea ====
Name	Novelty	Status	Authors	Age	Type locality	Location	Notes	Images
Cretaceomma	Gen. et sp. nov	Valid	Rasnitsyn et al.	Early Cretaceous	Lebanese amber	Lebanon	A member of the family Gallorommatidae. The type species is C. libanensis.	

==== Proctotrupoidea ====
Name	Novelty	Status	Authors	Age	Type locality	Location	Notes	Images
Astarteserphus	Gen. et sp. nov	Valid	Engel, Herhold & Barden	Early Cretaceous	Lebanese amber	Lebanon	A member of the family Proctotrupidae. Genus includes new species A. grimaldii.	
Cresogmus	Gen. et sp. nov	Valid	Rasnitsyn & Kolyada in Rasnitsyn et al.	Cretaceous	Burmese amber	Myanmar	A member of the family Proctotrupidae. Genus includes new species C. grimaldii.	
Paekthohelorus	Gen. et sp. nov		Ri et al.	Early Cretaceous (Barremian–Aptian)	Sinuiju Formation	North Korea	A member of the family Heloridae. Genus includes new species P. sinuijuensis.	

==== Serphitoidea ====
Name	Novelty	Status	Authors	Age	Type locality	Location	Notes	Images
Leptoserphites	Gen. et 2 sp. nov	Valid	Rasnitsyn et al.	Early Cretaceous	Lebanese amber	Lebanon	A member of the family Serphitidae. Genus includes new species L. pabloi and L. iriae.	
Microserphites libanensis	Sp. nov	Valid	Rasnitsyn et al.	Early Cretaceous	Lebanese amber	Lebanon	A member of the family Serphitidae.	

==== Stephanoidea ====
Name	Novelty	Status	Authors	Age	Type locality	Location	Notes	Images
Myanmarina diversa	Sp. nov	In press	Zheng et al.	Cretaceous	Burmese amber	Myanmar	A member of the family Myanmarinidae.	
Proapocritus habitus	Sp. nov		Li et al.	Middle Jurassic	Haifanggou Formation	China	A member of the family Ephialtitidae.	

==== Tiphioidea ====
Name	Novelty	Status	Authors	Age	Type locality	Location	Notes	Images
Burmatiphia	Gen. et sp. nov	In press	Zheng et al.	Late Cretaceous (Cenomanian)	Burmese amber	Myanmar	A member of the family Tiphiidae. Genus includes new species B. mandibulata.	

==== Other Apocrita ====
Name	Novelty	Status	Authors	Age	Type locality	Location	Notes	Images
Prionaspidion	Gen. et 2 sp. nov	Valid	Lepeco & Melo in Lepeco, Barbosa & Melo	Cretaceous	Burmese amber	Myanmar	A member of Aculeata belonging to the family Trifionychidae. The type species is P. brevidens; genus also includes P. nanus.	
Trifionyx	Fam. et gen. et sp. nov	Valid	Lepeco & Melo in Lepeco, Barbosa & Melo	Cretaceous	Burmese amber	Myanmar	A member of Aculeata; the type genus of the new family Trifionychidae (possibly belonging to the superfamily Bethylonymoidea). The type species is T. pilosus.	
Trifionyximus	Gen. et sp. nov	Valid	Lepeco & Melo in Lepeco, Barbosa & Melo	Cretaceous	Burmese amber	Myanmar	A member of Aculeata belonging to the family Trifionychidae. The type species is T. cracens.	

==== Apocritan research ====
- A bethylid specimen belonging to the genus Eupsenella (currently confined to Australia and New Zealand and with the fossil record previously only known from the Old World) is described from the Eocene Green River Formation by Brazidec & Perrichot (2022).
- Richter et al. (2022) describe almost completely preserved internal head structures of a specimen of Gerontoformica gracilis from the Cretaceous amber from Myanmar.
- Zhuang et al. (2022) describe a female specimen of Zigrasimecia with exceptionally preserved soft tissues from the Cretaceous amber from Myanmar.

== Clade Neuropterida ==
=== Megaloptera ===
==== Megalopteran research ====
- A review of the fossil record of megalopteran and megalopteran-like larvae, including descriptions of new larvae from the Cretaceous Burmese amber, Eocene Green River Formation and Miocene Foulden Maar fossil site (New Zealand), is published by Baranov et al. (2022).

=== Neuroptera ===
==== New taxa ====
Name	Novelty	Status	Authors	Age	Type locality	Location	Notes	Images
Acanthochrysa	Gen. et sp. nov	In press	Liu et al.	Cretaceous	Burmese amber	Myanmar	A member of Chrysopoidea. Genus includes new species A. langae.	
Aggregataberotha	Gen. et sp. nov		Wang, Huang & Wang in Wang et al.	Cretaceous	Burmese amber	Myanmar	A member of the family Berothidae. Genus includes new species A. punctata.	
Araripenymphpes burmanus	Sp. nov	Valid	Lu, Xu & Liu	Late Cretaceous (Cenomanian)	Burmese amber	Myanmar	A member of Myrmeleontoidea belonging to the family Cratosmylidae.	
Arbusella platyptera	Sp. nov		Ma & Wang in Ma et al.	Middle Jurassic (Aalenian/Bajocian boundary)	Jiulongshan Formation	China	A member of the family Osmylidae belonging to the subfamily Kempyninae.	
Archaeochrysa cockerelli	Sp. nov	Valid	Makarkin, Antell & Archibald	Eocene	Florissant Formation	United States (Colorado)	A member of the family Chrysopidae belonging to the subfamily Nothochrysinae.	
Archaeoconis	Gen. et sp. nov		Chen et al.	Late Cretaceous (Cenomanian)	Burmese amber	Myanmar	A member of the family Coniopterygidae belonging to the subfamily Cretaconiopteryginae. Genus includes new species A. zhangzhiqiae.	
Archaeomegalomus	Gen. et sp. nov	Valid	Nakamine, Yamamoto & Takahashi	Cretaceous (Albian to Cenomanian)	Burmese amber	Myanmar	A member of the family Hemerobiidae. The type species is A. burmiticus.	
Burmotachinymphes pengi	Sp. nov	Valid	Chen, Deng & Yang in Chen et al.	Late Cretaceous (Cenomanian)	Burmese amber	Myanmar	A member of the family Mesochrysopidae.	
Cimbrochrysa americana	Sp. nov	Valid	Makarkin, Antell & Archibald	Eocene	Florissant Formation	United States (Colorado)	A member of the family Chrysopidae belonging to the subfamily Nothochrysinae.	
Cimbrochrysa major	Sp. nov	Valid	Makarkin, Antell & Archibald	Eocene	Florissant Formation	United States (Colorado)	A member of the family Chrysopidae belonging to the subfamily Nothochrysinae.	
Coronidilar	Gen. et sp. nov		Chen et al.	Late Cretaceous (Cenomanian)	Burmese amber	Myanmar	A member of the family Dilaridae. Genus includes new species C. yanae.	
Cretaconiopteryx zhengpengyueae	Sp. nov		Chen et al.	Late Cretaceous (Cenomanian)	Burmese amber	Myanmar	A member of the family Coniopterygidae belonging to the subfamily Cretaconiopteryginae.	
Cretapsychops skywalkeri	Sp. nov	Valid	Khramov & Chemakos	Late Jurassic	Karabastau Formation	Kazakhstan	A member of the family Psychopsidae.	
Cretodilar multinervius	Sp. nov		Chen et al.	Late Cretaceous (Cenomanian)	Burmese amber	Myanmar	A member of the family Dilaridae.	
Cretoneuronema	Gen. et sp. nov	Valid	Liu, Chen & Zhuo	Cretaceous	Burmese amber	Myanmar	A member of the family Hemerobiidae. The type species is C. jarzembowskii.	
Doratomantispa arcimaculata	Sp. nov	Valid	Li et al.	Cretaceous	Burmese amber	Myanmar	A member of the family Mantispidae.	
Doratomantispa gaoyuhei	Sp. nov	Valid	Li et al.	Cretaceous	Burmese amber	Myanmar	A member of the family Mantispidae.	
Doratomantispa pouilloni	Sp. nov	Valid	Jouault & Nel in Jouault, Pouillon & Nel	Cretaceous (Albian-Cenomanian)	Burmese amber	Myanmar	A member of the family Mantispidae.	
Doratomantispa yumeiyingae	Sp. nov	Valid	Li et al.	Cretaceous	Burmese amber	Myanmar	A member of the family Mantispidae.	
Doratomantispa zhangwenjuni	Sp. nov	Valid	Li et al.	Cretaceous	Burmese amber	Myanmar	A member of the family Mantispidae.	
Doratomantispa zhangzhiqiae	Sp. nov	Valid	Li et al.	Cretaceous	Burmese amber	Myanmar	A member of the family Mantispidae.	
Doratomantispa zhuozhengmingi	Sp. nov	Valid	Li et al.	Cretaceous	Burmese amber	Myanmar	A member of the family Mantispidae.	
Electrobabinskaia neli	Sp. nov	Valid	Jouault	Cretaceous	Burmese amber	Myanmar	A member of the family Babinskaiidae. Transferred to the genus Pseudelectrobabinskaia by Pu et al. (2025).	
Heteroconis zhangpuensis	Sp. nov	In press	Chen, Li & Liu	Miocene	Zhangpu amber	China	A species of Heteroconis.	
Jersiberotha musivum	Sp. nov	Valid	Zhang et al.	Late Cretaceous (Cenomanian)	Burmese amber	Myanmar	A member of the family Berothidae.	
Kuafupolydentes	Gen. et sp. nov	In press	Luo, Liu & Jarzembowski	Cretaceous	Burmese amber	Myanmar	An early member of Myrmeleontiformia. The type species is K. hui.	
Lebanosmylus	Gen. et sp. nov	Valid	Azar & Nel	Late Cretaceous (Cenomanian)		Lebanon	A member of the family Saucrosmylidae. The type species is L. leae.	
Lithochrysa meyeri	Sp. nov	Valid	Makarkin, Antell & Archibald	Eocene	Florissant Formation	United States (Colorado)	A member of the family Chrysopidae belonging to the subfamily Nothochrysinae.	
Mantispa? damzenogedanica	Sp. nov	Valid	Baranov et al.	Eocene (Bartonian‒Priabonian)	Baltic amber	Russia (Kaliningrad Oblast)	Possibly a species of Mantispa.	
Mesypochrysa coadnata	Sp. nov	In press	Chen et al.	Cretaceous	Burmese amber	Myanmar	A member of the family Chrysopidae belonging to the subfamily Limaiinae.	
Microsisyra	Gen. et sp. nov		Makarkin	Cretaceous	Burmese amber	Myanmar	A member of the family Sisyridae. Genus includes new species M. carsteni.	
Olindanymphes? headsi	Sp. nov	Valid	Makarkin	Early Cretaceous (Aptian)	Crato Formation	Brazil	A member of the family Nymphidae.	
Paradoxoconis	Gen. et 2 sp. nov	Valid	Chen et al.	Late Cretaceous (Cenomanian)	Burmese amber	Myanmar	A member of the family Coniopterygidae. The type species is P. longipalpa; genus also includes P. szirakii.	
Paradoxoleon	Gen. et sp. nov	Valid	Lu, Xu & Liu	Late Cretaceous (Cenomanian)	Burmese amber	Myanmar	A member of the family Babinskaiidae. The type species is P. chenruii.	
Paradoxomantispa mahaiyingae	Sp. nov	Valid	Li et al.	Cretaceous	Burmese amber	Myanmar	A member of the family Mantispidae.	
Sinuijuala	Gen. et sp. nov	In press	So & Won	Early Cretaceous (Barremian-Aptian)	Sinuiju Formation	North Korea	A member of the family Ithonidae. The type species is S. paekthoensis.	
Sinuijumantispa	Gen. et sp. nov	In press	So & Won	Early Cretaceous (Barremian-Aptian)	Sinuiju Formation	North Korea	A member of the family Mantispidae. The type species is S. ryonsangiensis.	
Xiaoberotha dilatapoda	Sp. nov		Wang, Huang & Wang in Wang et al.	Cretaceous	Burmese amber	Myanmar	A member of the family Berothidae.	
Xiaoleon	Gen. et sp. nov	In press	Lu & Liu	Cretaceous	Burmese amber	Myanmar	An antlion. Genus includes new species X. amoena.	

==== Neuropteran research ====
- A study on the fossil record of aphidlions and aphidlion-like lacewing larvae, including reports of new specimens from the Cretaceous Burmese amber and Eocene Baltic amber and a study on the morphological diversity of the heads of the fossil larvae, is published by Haug et al. (2022).
- Haug et al. (2022) describe an aphidlion-like larva from the Cretaceous Burmese amber, preserved in close proximity to an empty egg case, and interpreted by the authors as likely representing the first newly hatched aphidlion-like larva reported from the Burmese amber.
- A hemerobiid aphidlion preserved with possible Cf. Germaraphis prey, representing the first possible case of a cooccurrence of predator and prey for lacewing larvae reported to date, is described from a piece of the Eocene Baltic amber by Haug et al. (2022).
- An overview of the diversity and fossil record of the larvae of the families Ithonidae, Sisyridae and Coniopterygidae is published by Haug et al. (2022).
- Two probable berothid larvae with extremely enlarged trunks are described from a single piece of the Cretaceous Kachin amber from Myanmar by Haug & Haug (2022), representing the oldest case of the extreme inflation of the trunk in insects reported to date.

=== Raphidioptera ===
Name	Novelty	Status	Authors	Age	Type locality	Location	Notes	Images
Siboptera lata	Sp. nov		Zhang et al.	Early Cretaceous (Aptian)	Baiwan Formation	China	A member of the family Mesoraphidiidae.	

==== Raphidiopteran research ====
- A study on the morphological diversity of snakefly larvae over the last 100 million years is published by Haug et al. (2022), who also describe new specimens of larval snakeflies preserved in Eocene and Cretaceous ambers.
- Makarkin et al. (2022) describe snakefly larvae from the Eocene Sakhalinian amber (the first confirmed representative of Raphidioptera from the Cenozoic of Asia) and Rovno amber (representing the first European Cenozoic immature snakefly found outside of Russo-Scandia).

== Clade †Palaeodictyopteroidea ==
=== †Megasecoptera ===
Name	Novelty	Status	Authors	Age	Type locality	Location	Notes	Images
Corydaloides leonensis	Sp. nov	Valid	Santos et al.	Late Carboniferous		Spain	A member of the family Corydaloididae. Announced in 2022; the final article version was published in 2023.	
Mischoptera bergidensis	Sp. nov	Valid	Santos et al.	Late Carboniferous		Spain	A member of the family Mischopteridae. Announced in 2022; the final article version was published in 2023.	
Piesbergptera	Fam. et gen. et sp. nov	In press	Rosová et al.	Carboniferous (Moscovian)		Germany	A megasecopteran The type genus of the new family Piesbergpteridae. Genus includes new species P. niesseae.	

=== †Palaeodictyoptera ===
Name	Novelty	Status	Authors	Age	Type locality	Location	Notes	Images
Osnabrugapteron	Gen. et sp. nov	In press	Rosová et al.	Carboniferous (Moscovian)		Germany	A palaeodictyopteran belonging to the family Archaemegaptilidae. Genus includes new species O. rasnitsyni.	
Saxonyptilus	Gen. et sp. nov	In press	Rosová et al.	Carboniferous (Moscovian)		Germany	A palaeodictyopteran belonging to the family Spilapteridae. Genus includes new species S. sowiaki.	
Spilaptera peckae	Sp. nov	In press	Rosová et al.	Carboniferous (Moscovian)		Germany	A palaeodictyopteran belonging to the family Spilapteridae.	

==== Palaeodictyopteran research ====
- A study on the abdominal lateral outgrowths (flaps) of Paleozoic palaeodictyopteran larvae is published by Prokop et al. (2022), who report that these flaps show comparable structure to thoracic wings, and most likely represent wing serial homologues.

== Clade Palaeoptera ==
=== Ephemeroptera ===
Name	Novelty	Status	Authors	Age	Type locality	Location	Notes	Images
Balticobaetisca bispinata	Sp. nov	Valid	Staniczek, Storari & Godunko	Eocene	Baltic amber	Russia (Kaliningrad Oblast)	A mayfly belonging to the family Baetiscidae.	
Calliarcys antiquus	Sp. nov	Valid	Godunko, Alba-Tercedor & Staniczek in Godunko et al.	Eocene	Baltic amber	Europe (Baltic Sea region)	A member of the family Leptophlebiidae.	
Cloeon tzeltal	Sp. nov	Valid	Varela-Hernández, Riquelme & Montiel-Chávez	Miocene	Mexican amber	Mexico	A species of Cloeon.	
Jurassephemera	Gen. et sp. nov	In press	Zhang et al.	Early Jurassic	Shiti Formation	China	A mayfly belonging to the family Sharephemeridae. The type species is J. zhangi.	
Kachinophlebia	Gen. et sp. nov	In press	Chen & Zheng	Cretaceous	Burmese amber	Myanmar	A member of the family Leptophlebiidae. Genus includes new species K. zhouchangfai.	

=== Odonatoptera ===
==== New taxa ====
Name	Novelty	Status	Authors	Age	Type locality	Location	Notes	Images
Aeshna caseneuvensis	Sp. nov		Nel et al.	Oligocene		France	A dragongly, a species of Aeshna.	
Afrozygopteron	Gen. et sp. nov	In press	Nel, Garrouste & Prevec	Permian (Guadalupian)		South Africa	A protozygopteran belonging to the family Luiseiidae. The type species is A. inexpectatus.	
Allenbya	Gen. et sp. nov	Valid	Archibald & Cannings	Eocene (Ypresian)	Allenby Formation	Canada (British Columbia)	A possible Dysagrionidae. The type species is A. holmesae. Not to be confused with the Princeton Chert Allenbya (plant) of the same formation.	Allenbya holmesae
Araripegomphus ismari	Sp. nov		Nel & Ribeiro	Early Cretaceous	Crato Formation	Brazil	A member of the family Araripegomphidae.	
Chacayala	Gen. et sp. nov	Valid	Petrulevičius	Eoocene		Argentina	A member of Odonata belonging to the family Frenguelliidae. The type species is C. campeona.	
Cratoaeschnidium	Gen. et sp. nov	In press	Nel, Jouault & Ribeiro	Early Cretaceous	Crato Formation	Brazil	A dragonfly belonging to the family Aeschnidiidae. The type species is C. martinsnetoi.	
Danowhetaksa	Gen. et 2 sp. nov	Valid	Simonsen et al.	Eocene (Ypresian)	Ølst Formation	Denmark	A whetwhetaksid odonate. Genus includes new species D. birgitteae and D. rusti.	
Gansuaeschnidia	Gen. et sp. nov	Valid	Zhang et al.	Early Cretaceous	Chijinpu Formation	China	A dragonfly belonging to the family Aeschnidiidae. The type species is G. hongi.	
Guangxicalopteryx	Gen. et sp. nov	Valid	Huang et al.	Oligocene	Ningming Formation	China	A damselfly belonging to the family Calopterygidae. The type species is G. huashanensis.	
Kennedya ferganensis	Sp. nov	Valid	Felker	Triassic	Madygen Formation	Kyrgyzstan	A Kennedyidae Archizygopteran.	
Kennedya madygensis	Sp. nov	Valid	Felker	Triassic	Madygen Formation	Kyrgyzstan	A Kennedyidae Archizygopteran	
Kishenehna	Gen. et sp. nov	Valid	Archibald, Cannings & Greenwalt	Eocene (Lutetian)	Kishenehn Formation	United States (Montana)	A Gomphaeschninae aeshnid dragonfly. The type species is K. prima.	
Koreaphlebia	Gen. et sp. nov	Valid	Jouault, Nam & Nel	Triassic	Amisan Formation	South Korea	A member of Triadophlebiomorpha belonging to the family Zygophlebiidae. Genus includes new species K. iussradiae.	
Koreatriassothemis	Gen. et sp. nov	Valid	Nel, Nam & Jouault	Late Triassic	Amisan Formation	South Korea	A member of Parazygoptera belonging to the superfamily Triassolestoidea. The type species is K. elongatus.	
Labandeiraia grimaldii	Sp. nov	Valid	Nel	Eocene	Oise amber	France	A member of the family Epallagidae.	
Macrogomphus menatensis	Sp. nov	Valid	Nel & Jouault	Paleocene		France	A dragonfly, a species of Macrogomphus.	
Menatagrion	Gen. et sp. nov	Valid	Nel & Jouault	Paleocene		France	A member of the family Dysagrionidae. The type species is M. hervetae.	
Menatlestes	Fam. et gen. et sp. nov	Valid	Nel & Jouault	Paleocene		France	A damselfly belonging to the group Lestinoidea and to the new family Menatlestidae. The type species is M. palaeocenicus.	
Oligaeschna sinica	Sp. nov	Valid	Huang et al.	Eocene (Bartonian)	Niubao Formation	China	An aeshnid dragonfly.	
Parapetala yixianensis	Sp. nov	In press	Zheng et al.	Early Cretaceous	Yixian Formation	China	A dragonfly belonging to the group Aeshnoptera.	
Pseudoliupanshania	Gen. et sp. nov	In press	Zheng et al.	Early Cretaceous	Yixian Formation	China	A dragonfly belonging to the group Aeshnoptera. Genus includes new species P. magnanicellula.	
Rudiaeschna jarzembowskii	Sp. nov	Valid	Huang, Jouault & Nel	Early Cretaceous	Yixian Formation	China	A member of the family Rudiaeschnidae.	
Sinomesuropetala	Gen. et sp. nov	In press	Boudet, Nel & Huang	Late Jurassic (Oxfordian)	Haifanggou Formation	China	A dragonfly belonging to the family Mesuropetalidae. The type species is S. daohugensis.	
Turanophlebia liaoningensis	Sp. nov		Fang & Zheng	Early Cretaceous	Yixian Formation	China	A member of the family Tarsophlebiidae.	
Viridiflumineagrion	Gen. et sp. nov	Valid	Nel	Early Eocene	Green River Formation	United States	A damselfly. Genus includes new species V. aasei.	

==== Odonatopteran research ====
- A study on the diversity of color patterns among Early Jurassic heterophlebiids is published by Jouault et al. (2022), who identify five different patterns of coloration in the studied fossil material, and interpret the appearance of patterns of colored spots and bands on the studied heterophlebiid wings as likely caused by the increase of the predation pressure by pterosaurs.

== Clade †Paoliidea ==
=== †Paoliida ===
Name	Novelty	Status	Authors	Age	Type locality	Location	Notes	Images
Glaphyrophlebia glinka	Sp. nov	Valid	Aristov, Rasnitsyn & Naugolnykh	Permian		Russia (Perm Krai)		
Glaphyrophlebia kamaensis	Sp. nov	Valid	Aristov & Rasnitsyn	Permian		Russia	A Blattinopsidae paoliid.	
Glaphyrophlebia popasnaya	Sp. nov	Valid	Aristov & Rasnitsyn	Carboniferous (Kasimovian)	Upper Isaeva Formation	Ukraine	A blattinopsid.	
Glaphyrophlebia rara	Sp. nov	Valid	Aristov & Rasnitsyn	Permian		Russia	A member of the family Blattinopsidae.	
Glaphyrophlebia semipenna	Sp. nov	Valid	Aristov, Rasnitsyn & Naugolnykh	Permian		Russia (Perm Krai)		
Glaphyrophlebia vaga	Sp. nov	Valid	Aristov & Rasnitsyn	Permian		Russia	A member of the family Blattinopsidae.	
Glaphyrophlebia victoiriensis	Sp. nov	Valid	Nel, Garrouste & Jouault in Nel et al.	Carboniferous (Gzhelian)		France	A member of the family Blattinopsidae.	
Simplexpaolia	Gen. et sp. nov	Valid	Santos et al.	Late Carboniferous		Spain	A member of the family Paoliidae. Genus includes new species S. prokopi. Announced in 2022; the final article version was published in 2023.	
Stephanopsis testai	Sp. nov	Valid	Dvořák, Krzemiński & Prokop	Carboniferous (Moscovian)	Mazon Creek fossil beds	United States (Illinois)	A blattinopsid.	

== Clade Paraneoptera ==
=== Hemipterans ===
==== Auchenorrhyncha ====
Name	Novelty	Status	Authors	Age	Type locality	Location	Notes	Images
Archaeomaguviopsis	Gen. et sp. nov	Valid	Fu & Huang	Middle Triassic	Yanchang Formation	China	A maguviopseid Cicadomorpha. The type species is A. magicus.	
Beloscyta	Gen. et sp. nov	Valid	Shcherbakov	Permian-Triassic boundary		Mongolia	A scytinopterid Cicadomorph. The type species is B. edi.	
Burbungoides	Gen. et sp. nov		Moulds, Frese & McCurry	Miocene	McGraths Flat Lagerstätte	Australia	A member of the family Cicadidae. Genus includes new species B. gulgongensis.	
Burmotettix	Gen. et 5 sp. nov	Valid	Dietrich & Zhang in Dietrich et al.	Late Cretaceous (Cenomanian)	Burmese amber	Myanmar	A leafhopper. The type species is B. depressus; genus also includes B. brunnescens, B. limpidus, B. ruber, and B. rugosus.	
Cretodorus multifoveatus	Sp. nov		Liu et al.	Cretaceous	Burmese amber	Myanmar	A mimarachnid planthopper.	
Cycloscytina incompleta	Sp. nov	Valid	Chen et al.	Jurassic	Daohugou Beds	China	A hylicellid cicadomorph.	
Eocicadellium	Gen. et sp. nov	Valid	Fu & Huang	Triassic	Yanchang Formation	China	A member of the family Archijassidae belonging to the subfamily Karajassinae. The type species is E. grimaldii.	
Eumorphoptila	Gen. et sp. nov	Valid	Shcherbakov	Middle Jurassic (Bathonian)	Itat Formation	Russia (Krasnoyarsk Krai)	A dysmorphoptilid Prosboloidea Cicadomorph. The type species is E. pritykinae.	
Gedanochila	Gen. et sp. nov	Valid	Brysz, Bourgoin & Szwedo	Eocene (Lutetian)	Baltic amber	Gdańsk Bay area	An Achilidae planthopper. The type species is G. museisucini.	
Ilimpeika	Gen. et sp. nov	Valid	Shcherbakov	Late Permian	Degali Formation	Russia (Krasnoyarsk Krai)	A member of Cicadomorpha belonging to the superfamily Pereborioidea and the family Ignotalidae. The type species is I. humerosa.	
Ingensala	Gen. et sp. nov	Valid	Luo, Song & Szwedo in Luo et al.	Late Cretaceous (Cenomanian)	Burmese amber	Myanmar	An inoderbid planthopper. The type species is I. xiai.	
Jaculistilus xixuanae	Sp. nov	In press	Jiang, Chen & Szwedo	Cretaceous	Burmese amber	Myanmar	A member of the family Mimarachnidae.	
Kachinella	Gen. et sp. nov	Valid	Dietrich & Zhang in Dietrich et al.	Late Cretaceous (Cenomanian)	Burmese amber	Myanmar	A leafhopper. The type species is K. bicolor.	
Karoontina	Gen. et comb. nov	Valid	Shcherbakov	Late Triassic		South Africa	A member of the family Palaeontinidae. The type species is "Fletcheriana" magna Riek (1976).	
Laiyangella	Gen. et sp. nov		Zhao et al.	Early Cretaceous	Laiyang Formation	China	A planthopper. Genus includes new species L. zhangi.	
Laopsaltria	Gen. et sp. nov		Moulds, Frese & McCurry	Miocene	McGraths Flat Lagerstätte	Australia	A member of the family Cicadidae. Genus includes new species L. ferruginosa.	
Longucercopis	Gen. et sp. nov	Valid	Zhang, Chen & Zhang	Early Jurassic (Pliensbachian-Toarcian)	Sangonghe Formation	China	A procercopid froghopper. The type species is L. xinjiangensis.	
Maculixius	Gen. et sp. nov	Valid	Bourgoin & Wang in Wang, Liang & Bourgoin	Late Cretaceous (Cenomanian)	Burmese amber	Myanmar	An acrotiarine cixiid planthopper. The type species is M. jiewenae.	
Nangamostethos	Gen. et sp. nov	Valid	Xu & Szwedo in Xu et al.	Late Eocene	Niubao Formation	China	A member of the family Cercopidae belonging to the subfamily Cercopinae and the tribe Cosmoscartini. The type species is N. tibetense.	
Papiliontina	Gen. et 3 sp. nov	Valid	Shcherbakov	Triassic	Madygen Formation	Kyrgyzstan	A member of the family Palaeontinidae. The type species is P. dracomima; genus also includes P. machaon and P. spectans.	
Sinogranulus jinsuoguanensis	Sp. nov	Valid	Fu & Huang in Fu, Gao & Huang	Middle Triassic	Yanchang Formation	China	A granulid scytinopteroid cicadomorph.	
Sinoscarterella	Gen. et sp. nov	Valid	Nel, Fu & Huang in Wang et al.	Early Jurassic (Pliensbachian-Toarcian)	Sangonghe Formation	China	A dysmorphoptilid Prosboloidea cicadomorph. The type species is S. incompleta.	
Stonymetopus	Gen. et sp. nov	Valid	Poinar, Brown & Bourgoin	Cretaceous	Burmese amber	Myanmar	A fulgoridiid planthopper. The type species is S. megus.	
Strivicia	Gen. et sp. nov	Valid	Shcherbakov	Triassic (Ladinian–Carnian)	Madygen Formation	Kyrgyzstan	An ipsviciid cicadomorph. The type species is S. davidi.	
Tenebricosus	Gen. et sp. nov	In press	He et al.	Cretaceous	Burmese amber	Myanmar	A member of the family Mimarachnidae. The type species is T. coriaceus.	
Tennentsia koreana	Sp. nov	Valid	Nel, Nam & Jouault	Late Triassic	Amisan Formation	South Korea	A dysmorphoptilid cicadomorph.	
Tithopsaltria	Gen. et sp. nov		Moulds, Frese & McCurry	Miocene	McGraths Flat Lagerstätte	Australia	A member of the family Cicadidae. Genus includes new species T. titan.	
Unturella	Gen. et sp. nov	Valid	Shcherbakov	Late Permian (Changhsingian), possibly also Early Triassic	Nidym Formation or lower Kochechumo Formation	Russia (Krasnoyarsk Krai)	A dysmorphoptilid Prosboloidea cicadomorph. The type species is U. truncata.	
Viraktamathus	Gen. et sp. nov	Valid	Dietrich & Zhang in Dietrich et al.	Late Cretaceous (Cenomanian)	Burmese amber	Myanmar	A leafhopper. The type species is V. burmensis.	
Wangala	Gen. et sp. nov		Chen et al.	Cretaceous	Burmese amber	Myanmar	A froghopper belonging to the family Sinoalidae. Genus includes new species W. gigantea.	
Xiaochibangus	Gen. et comb. nov	In press	Jiang, Chen & Szwedo	Cretaceous	Burmese amber	Myanmar	A member of the family Mimarachnidae. Genus includes "Dachibangus" formosus Fu et al. (2019) and "Dachibangus" hui Zhang, Yao & Pang in Zhang et al. (2021).	
Yobuenahuaboshka	Gen. et sp. nov	Valid	Szwedo et al.	Miocene (Burdigalian)	Dominican amber	Dominican Republic	A planthopper belonging to the family Nogodinidae. The type species is Y. rectangialatus.	
Zhangpumazus	Gen. et sp. nov	In press	Luo et al.	Miocene	Zhangpu amber	China	A caliscelid planthopper. The type species is Z. sheni.	

==== Coleorrhyncha ====
Name	Novelty	Status	Authors	Age	Type locality	Location	Notes	Images
Permoridium	Fam. et gen. et sp. nov	Valid	Burckhardt et al.	Early Permian	Saar–Nahe Basin	Germany	A Coleorrhynchan. The type genus of the new family Permoridiidae; The type species is P. fresenaci.	

==== Heteroptera ====
===== New taxa =====
Name	Novelty	Status	Authors	Age	Type locality	Location	Notes	Images
Acanthamnestus	Gen. et 2 sp. nov	Valid	Du, Yao & Engel in Du et al.	Late Cretaceous (Cenomanian)	Burmese amber	Myanmar	An amnestine cydnid bug. The type species is A. atridorsus and also includes A. ovoideus.	
Arcochterus	Gen. et sp. nov		Zhang, Ren & Yao in Zhang et al.	Cretaceous	Burmese amber	Myanmar	A member of the family Ochteridae. The type species is A. fuscus.	
Caulisoculus monlyae	Sp. nov	In press	Zhuo & Chen in Zhuo et al.	Late Cretaceous (Cenomanian)	Burmese amber	Myanmar	A member of the family Yuripopovinidae.	
Cretocephalus	Gen. et sp. nov	In press	Luo & Xie	Cretaceous	Burmese amber	Myanmar	A member of the family Aenictopecheidae. The type species is C. stysi.	
Laevigemma	Gen. et sp. nov	Valid	Du, Yao & Engel in Du et al.	Late Cretaceous (Cenomanian)	Burmese amber	Myanmar	An amnestine cydnid heteropteran. The type species is L. lisorum.	
Leptosaldinea zhengmingi	Sp. nov	In press	Chen & Zhuo in Chen et al.	Cretaceous	Burmese amber	Myanmar	A possible schizopterid dipsocoromorph heteropteran.	
Megaoptocoris	Gen. et 2 sp. nov	In press	Zhou et al.	Cretaceous	Burmese amber	Myanmar	A yuripopovinid heteropteran. Genus includes M. punctatus & M. similis.	
Pachytylaradus	Gen. et sp. nov	Valid	Heiss	Cretaceous	Burmese amber	Myanmar	An aradid flat bug. The type species is P. cretaceous.	
Palaeotanyrhina	Fam., gen. et sp. nov	Valid	Poinar, Brown & Kóbor	Cretaceous	Burmese amber	Myanmar	Originally described as a reduvioid, cimicomorph heteropteran and the type genus of the new family Palaeotanyrhinidae. Subsequently transferred to the family Leptopodidae by Rédei (2024). The type species is P. exophthalma.	Palaeotanyrhina exophthalma
Parvochterus	Gen. et 2 sp. nov		Zhang, Ren & Yao in Zhang et al.	Cretaceous	Burmese amber	Myanmar	A velvety shore bug. The type species is P. reticulatus & also includes P. lanceolarus.	
Quinalveus	Gen. et sp. nov	Valid	Du, Yao & Engel in Du et al.	Late Cretaceous (Cenomanian)	Burmese amber	Myanmar	An Amnestine burrowing bug. The type species is Q. hui.	
Simplicivenius	Gen. et 2 sp. nov		Zhang, Liu & Yao in Zhang et al.	Cretaceous (Barremian-Aptian)	Yixian Formation	China	An assassin bug. The type species is S. tuberculosus& includes S. rectidorsius.	
Varicapitatus	Gen. et sp. nov	Valid	Dai, Du & Yao in Dai et al.	Early Cretaceous	Yixian Formation	China	A member of Pentatomomorpha belonging to the family Pachymeridiidae. The type species is V. sinuolatus.	

===== Heteropteran research =====
- Fu et al. (2022) describe adult females of the water boatman Karataviella popovi from the Middle–Late Jurassic Daohugou biota (China) bearing clutches of eggs on their left mesotibia, representing the earliest direct evidence of brood care among insects reported to date.
- Redescription of Eocenocydnus lisi is published by Lis (2022), who assigns this species to the tribe Cydnini within the family Cydnidae.

==== Sternorrhyncha ====
===== New taxa =====
Name	Novelty	Status	Authors	Age	Type locality	Location	Notes	Images
Burmapsyllidium grimaldii	Sp. nov	Valid	Hakim, Azar & Huang	Cretaceous	Burmese amber	Myanmar	A member of Protopsyllidioidea belonging to the family Paraprotopsyllidiidae.	
Burmodicus monlyae	Sp. nov	In press	Chen & Zhuo in Chen et al.	Late Cretaceous (Cenomanian)	Burmese amber	Myanmar	A whitefly belonging to the subfamily Aleurodicinae.	
Medocellodes	Gen. et sp. nov	Valid	Drohojowska & Szwedo in Drohojowska et al.	Eocene	Baltic amber	Europe (Gdańsk Bay region)	A whitefly. The type species is M. blackmani.	
Megalophthallidion	Gen. et sp. nov	Valid	Drohojowska & Szwedo in Drohojowska, Zmarzły & Szwedo	Late Cretaceous (Cenomanian)	Burmese amber	Myanmar	A member of Protopsyllidioidea belonging to the family Postopsyllidiidae. The type species is M. burmapateron.	
Talbragaropsyllidium	Gen. et sp. nov	In press	Li et al.	Late Jurassic		Australia	A protopsyllidiid Sternorrhyncha. The type species is T. averyi.	
Triassopsyllidiida	Gen. et sp. nov	Valid	Huang et al.	Middle Triassic (Ladinian)	Yanchang Formation	China	A possible permopsyllidiid Sternorrhyncha. The type species is T. pectinata.	

===== Sternorrhyncha research =====
- A redescription of Khatangaphis sibirica is published by Ogłaza, Perkovsky & Węgierek (2022).
- A redescription of Canadaphis mordvilkoi, based on data from a new specimen from the Cretaceous amber from the Kheta Formation (Taymyr Peninsula, Krasnoyarsk Krai, Russia), is published by Ogłaza, Perkovsky & Węgierek (2022).

=== Psocodea ===
Name	Novelty	Status	Authors	Age	Type locality	Location	Notes	Images
Belaphotroctes grimaldii	Sp. nov	Valid	Engel & Wang	Miocene (Langhian)	Zhangpu amber	China	A member of the family Liposcelididae.	
Brachyantennum	Gen. et sp. nov	Valid	Liang & Liu in Zhang, Liang & Liu	Late Cretaceous (Cenomanian)	Burmese amber	Myanmar	A member of Trogiomorpha of uncertain affinities. The type species is B. spinosum.	
Burmempheria curvatavena	Sp. nov	Valid	Li, Yoshizawa & Yao in Li et al.	Late Cretaceous (Cenomanian)	Burmese amber	Myanmar	A member of Psocodea belonging to the family Empheriidae.	
Latempheria	Gen. et sp. nov	Valid	Li, Yoshizawa & Yao in Li et al.	Late Cretaceous (Cenomanian)	Burmese amber	Myanmar	A member of Psocodea belonging to the family Empheriidae. The type species is L. kachinensis.	
Libanoglaris hespericus	Sp. nov	Valid	Álvarez-Parra et al.	Early Cretaceous (Albian)	Escucha Formation	Spain	A member of Psocodea belonging to the family Archaeatropidae.	
Longiantennum	Gen. et sp. nov	In press	Liang et al.	Cretaceous	Burmese amber	Myanmar	A member of Psocodea belonging to the family Archaeatropidae. The type species is L. fashengi.	
Parathylacella	Gen. et sp. nov	In press	Álvarez-Parra & Nel	Eocene	Oise amber	France	A Lepidopsocidae Psocodean. Genus includes new species P. oisensis.	

=== Thysanoptera ===
Name	Novelty	Status	Authors	Age	Type locality	Location	Notes	Images
Adstrictubothrips	Gen. et sp. nov	Valid	Ulitzka	Late Cretaceous (Cenomanian)	Burmese amber	Myanmar	A thrips belonging to the family Rohrthripidae. Genus includes new species A. mirapterus.	
Alavathrips	Gen. et sp. nov	In press	Peñalver, Nel & Nel	Early Cretaceous (Albian)	Álava amber	Spain	A thrips belonging to the family Phlaeothripidae or Rohrthripidae. Genus includes new species A. moralesi.	
Gemineurothrips	Gen. et 2 sp. nov	Valid	Ulitzka	Late Cretaceous (Cenomanian)	Burmese amber	Myanmar	A thrips belonging to the family Rohrthripidae. Genus includes new species G. microcephalus and G. peculiaris.	
Paralleloalathrips	Gen. et sp. nov	Valid	Ulitzka	Late Cretaceous (Cenomanian)	Burmese amber	Myanmar	A thrips belonging to the family Rohrthripidae. Genus includes new species P. bivenatus.	
Rohrthrips brachyvenis	Sp. nov	Valid	Ulitzka	Late Cretaceous (Cenomanian)	Burmese amber	Myanmar	A thrips belonging to the family Rohrthripidae.	
Rohrthrips multihamuli	Sp. nov	Valid	Ulitzka	Late Cretaceous (Cenomanian)	Burmese amber	Myanmar	A thrips belonging to the family Rohrthripidae.	
Rohrthrips pandemicus	Sp. nov	Valid	Ulitzka	Late Cretaceous (Cenomanian)	Burmese amber	Myanmar	A thrips belonging to the family Rohrthripidae.	
Rohrthrips rhamphorhynchus	Sp. nov	Valid	Ulitzka	Late Cretaceous (Cenomanian)	Burmese amber	Myanmar	A thrips belonging to the family Rohrthripidae.	
Rohrthrips setiger	Sp. nov	Valid	Ulitzka	Late Cretaceous (Cenomanian)	Burmese amber	Myanmar	A thrips belonging to the family Rohrthripidae.	
Sesquithrips	Gen. et 2 sp. nov	Valid	Ulitzka	Late Cretaceous (Cenomanian)	Burmese amber	Myanmar	A thrips belonging to the family Rohrthripidae. Genus includes new species S. markpankowskii and S. rostratus.	

== Clade Perlidea ==
=== Dermapterans ===
Name	Novelty	Status	Authors	Age	Type locality	Country	Notes	Images
Stonychopygia laticoncava	Sp. nov	In press	Wang et al.	Cretaceous	Burmese amber	Myanmar	A pygidicranid earwig.	
Tricholabidura	Gen. et sp. nov	In press	Peng & Engel in Peng et al.	Cretaceous	Burmese amber	Myanmar	A labidurid earwig. The type species is T. elongata.	

=== Embioptera ===
Name	Novelty	Status	Authors	Age	Type locality	Location	Notes	Images
Gnethoda putshkovi	Sp. nov	In press	Anisyutkin & Perkovsky	Cretaceous	Burmese amber	Myanmar	A member of Embiodea.	
Parasorellembia	Gen. et sp. nov	In press	Anisyutkin & Perkovsky	Cretaceous	Burmese amber	Myanmar	A member of Embiodea. Genus includes new species P. groehni.	

=== Phasmatodea ===
Name	Novelty	Status	Authors	Age	Type locality	Location	Notes	Images
Adjacivena grossa	Sp. nov		Yang, Engel, Ren & Gao in Yang et al.	Middle Jurassic	Jiulongshan Formation	China	A member of the family Susumaniidae belonging to the subfamily Aclistophasmatinae.	
Ambrotophasma	Gen. et sp. nov		Yang, Engel, Ren & Gao in Yang et al.	Middle Jurassic	Jiulongshan Formation	China	A member of the family Pterophasmatidae. The type species is A. vetulum.	
Araripephasma	Gen. et comb. nov	Valid	Ghirotto et al.	Early Cretaceous (Aptian)	Crato Formation	Brazil	A stick insect belonging to the group Euphasmatodea. The type species is "Eoproscopia" reliquum (2019).	
Elasmophasma longitubus	Sp. nov		Yang, Engel, Ren & Gao in Yang et al.	Cretaceous	Burmese amber	Myanmar	A member of Euphasmatodea belonging to the group Neophasmatodea.	
Rhabdophasma	Gen. et sp. nov		Yang, Engel, Ren & Gao in Yang et al.	Cretaceous	Burmese amber	Myanmar	A member of Euphasmatodea belonging to the group Neophasmatodea. The type species is R. arboreum.	
Tanaophasma	Gen. et sp. nov		Yang, Engel, Ren & Gao in Yang et al.	Cretaceous	Burmese amber	Myanmar	A member of Euphasmatodea belonging to the group Neophasmatodea. The type species is T. applanatum.	

=== Plecopterans ===
==== New taxa ====
Name	Novelty	Status	Authors	Age	Type locality	Location	Notes	Images
Amphinemura himberii	Sp. nov	In press	Xu, Nel & Millet	Miocene	Zhangpu amber	China	A species of Amphinemura.	
Baltileuctra dewalti	Sp. nov	Valid	Chen in Chen & Liu	Eocene	Baltic amber	Lithuania	A member of the family Leuctridae.	
Brachyptera dewalti	Sp. nov	In press	Chen	Eocene	Baltic amber	Europe (Baltic Sea region)	A species of Brachyptera.	
Burmaperla	Gen. et sp. nov	In press	Jouault & Nel in Jouault et al.	Cretaceous	Burmese amber	Myanmar	A member of the family Perlidae. Genus includes new species B. pouilloni.	
Kachinoperla	Fam. et gen. et sp. nov	Valid	Chen	Cretaceous (Albian to Cenomanian)	Burmese amber	Myanmar	A member of Arctoperlaria belonging to the new family Kachinoperlidae. The type species is K. zwicki.	
Largusoperla zhouchangfai	Sp. nov	In press	Chen	Cretaceous	Burmese amber	Myanmar	A member of the family Perlidae.	
Ovaloperla	Gen. et sp. nov	In press	Chen & Xu	Cretaceous	Burmese amber	Myanmar	A member of the family Petroperlidae. The type species is O. staniczeki.	
Perspicuusoperla	Fam. et gen. et sp. nov	Valid	Chen	Cretaceous (Albian-Cenomanian)	Burmese amber	Myanmar	A member of Arctoperlaria, the type genus of the new family Perspicuusoperlidae. The type species is P. lata.	

==== Plecopteran research ====
- A study on the diversity dynamics of plecopterans throughout their evolutionary history, based on data from the fossil record, is published by Jouault et al. (2022)

== Clade †Reculida ==
Name	Novelty	Status	Authors	Age	Type locality	Location	Notes	Images
Chauliodites tongchuanensis	Sp. nov		Zhang, Jarzembowski & Wang	Middle Triassic (Ladinian)	Tongchuan Formation	China	A Chaulioditidae Reculida polyneopteran.	
Colubrosopterum	Gen. et sp. nov	Valid	Cawood & Nel in Cawood et al.	Permian (Wordian)	Waterford Formation	South Africa	A member of the family Liomopteridae. The type species is C. karooensis.	
Geinitziella	Gen. et sp. nov	Valid	Aristov	Triassic (Ladinian–Carnian)	Madygen Formation	Kyrgyzstan	A Geinitziidae Reculida Polyneoptera. Genus includes new species G. rasnitsyni.	
Liomopterum connexus	Sp. nov	Valid	Cawood & Nel in Cawood et al.	Permian (Wordian)	Waterford Formation	South Africa	A member of the family Liomopteridae.	
Liomopterum daenerys	Sp. nov	Valid	Cawood & Nel in Cawood et al.	Permian (Wordian)	Waterford Formation	South Africa	A member of the family Liomopteridae.	
Permoshurabia sukhonica	Sp. nov	Valid	Aristov	Late Permian		Russia	A member of Polyneoptera belonging to the group Reculida and the family Geinitziidae.	
Shurabia izyumica	Sp. nov	Valid	Aristov	Late Triassic (Norian)		Ukraine	A member of Polyneoptera belonging to the group Reculida and the family Geinitziidae.	
Shurabia minutissima	Sp. nov	Valid	Aristov	Triassic (Ladinian–Carnian)	Madygen Formation	Kyrgyzstan	A member of Polyneoptera belonging to the group Reculida and the family Geinitziidae.	
Shurabia taewani	Sp. nov		Jouault, Nam & Nel	Late Triassic	Amisan Formation	South Korea	A member of Polyneoptera belonging to the group Reculida and the family Geinitziidae.	

== Other insects ==
Name	Novelty	Status	Authors	Age	Type locality	Location	Notes	Images
Baharellinus orenburgensis	Sp. nov	Valid	Aristov	Early Triassic		Russia (Orenburg Oblast)	A member of Polyneoptera belonging to the group Eoblattida and the family Blattogryllidae.	
Lodevoisadia	Gen. et sp. nov	Valid	Nel et al.	Permian (probably Kungurian)	Salagou Formation	France	A "grylloblattodean" polyneopteran (i.e. a polyneopteran of uncertain affinities, possibly a member of the stem group of Grylloblattida). The type species is L. coheni.	
?Partisaniferus edjarzembowskii	Sp. nov	Valid	Haug & Haug	Late Cretaceous (Cenomanian)	Burmese amber	Myanmar	A member of Holometabola belonging to the group Neuropteriformia.	
Permosialis bayda	Sp. nov	Valid	Aristov & Rasnitsyn	Permian	Uskat Formation	Russia (Kemerovo Oblast)	A member of Palaeomanteida (Miomoptera) belonging to the family Permosialidae.	
Permosialis belebei	Sp. nov	Valid	Aristov & Rasnitsyn	Permian	Belebei Formation	Russia (Kirov Oblast)	A member of Palaeomanteida (Miomoptera) belonging to the family Permosialidae.	

== General research ==
- A study on the diversity dynamics of insects during the Permian and Triassic is published by Jouault et al. (2022), who find a pattern with three extinctions at the Roadian/Wordian, Permian/Triassic and Ladinian/Carnian boundaries, assess the effect of diversity changes between three or four guilds (herbivores, predators, detritivores/fungivores and generalists), and attempt to determine the factors influencing insect diversification dynamics throughout the Permian and Triassic.
- Conspecific aggregations of insects (dermapterans, neuropterans, orthopterans) and springtails are described from the Cretaceous Burmese amber by Hörnig et al. (2022), who attempt to determine whether these fossils could represent evidence of social behaviour.
- A flat wasp female preserved grasping and possibly stinging a beetle is described from the Cretaceous Burmese amber by Kiesmüller et al. (2022).
