= Entypoma =

Scientific classification
- Kingdom: Animalia
- Phylum: Arthropoda
- Class: Insecta
- Order: Hymenoptera
- Family: Ichneumonidae
- Genus: Entypoma; Förster, 1869

Genus of wasps

Entypoma is a genus of parasitoid wasps belonging to the family Ichneumonidae.

The species of this genus are found in Europe and Northern America.

Species:

- Entypoma ferale Rossem, 1988
- Entypoma frontosum Rossem, 1988
