= Dolichoneura =

Scientific classification
- Kingdom: Animalia
- Phylum: Arthropoda
- Class: Insecta
- Order: Lepidoptera
- Family: Geometridae
- Genus: Dolichoneura; Warren, 1894

Genus of moths

Dolichoneura is a genus of moths in the family Geometridae.

== Species ==
- Dolichoneura albidentata Warren, 1894
- Dolichoneura innotata Warren, 1894
