= Karataviella =

Karataviella Temporal range: Callovian–Barremian

Scientific classification
- Kingdom: Animalia
- Phylum: Arthropoda
- Clade: Pancrustacea
- Class: Insecta
- Order: Hemiptera
- Suborder: Heteroptera
- Family: Corixidae
- Subfamily: †Diaprepocorinae
- Genus: †Karataviella; Becker-Migdisova, 1949

Type species
- Karataviella brachyptera Becker-Migdisova, 1949

Other species
- Karataviella borzhensis Popov, 1985; Karataviella macra Zhang, 1986; Karataviella pontoforma Lin, 1976; Karataviella popovi Zhang, 2010; Karataviella samkhakensis Popov, 1985; Karataviella shandongensis Zhang, 1985; Karataviella stolida Zhang, 1986

Extinct genus of corixid hemipteran

Karataviella is an extinct genus of corixid bug that lived in Asia during the Jurassic and Cretaceous periods, from the Callovian to the Barremian stages.

== Distribution ==
Fossils of Karataviella are known from China, Kazakhstan, and Russia.

== Palaeobiology ==
=== Life history ===
Fossils of Karataviella popovi have been found preserving evidence of carrying clutches of eggs on the left mesotibia, representing an asymmetric egg-carrying behaviour that represented a unique brooding strategy unknown in any other animals.
