= Hedychridium =

Scientific classification
- Kingdom: Animalia
- Phylum: Arthropoda
- Class: Insecta
- Order: Hymenoptera
- Family: Chrysididae
- Genus: Hedychridium; Abeille de Perrin, 1878

Genus of insects

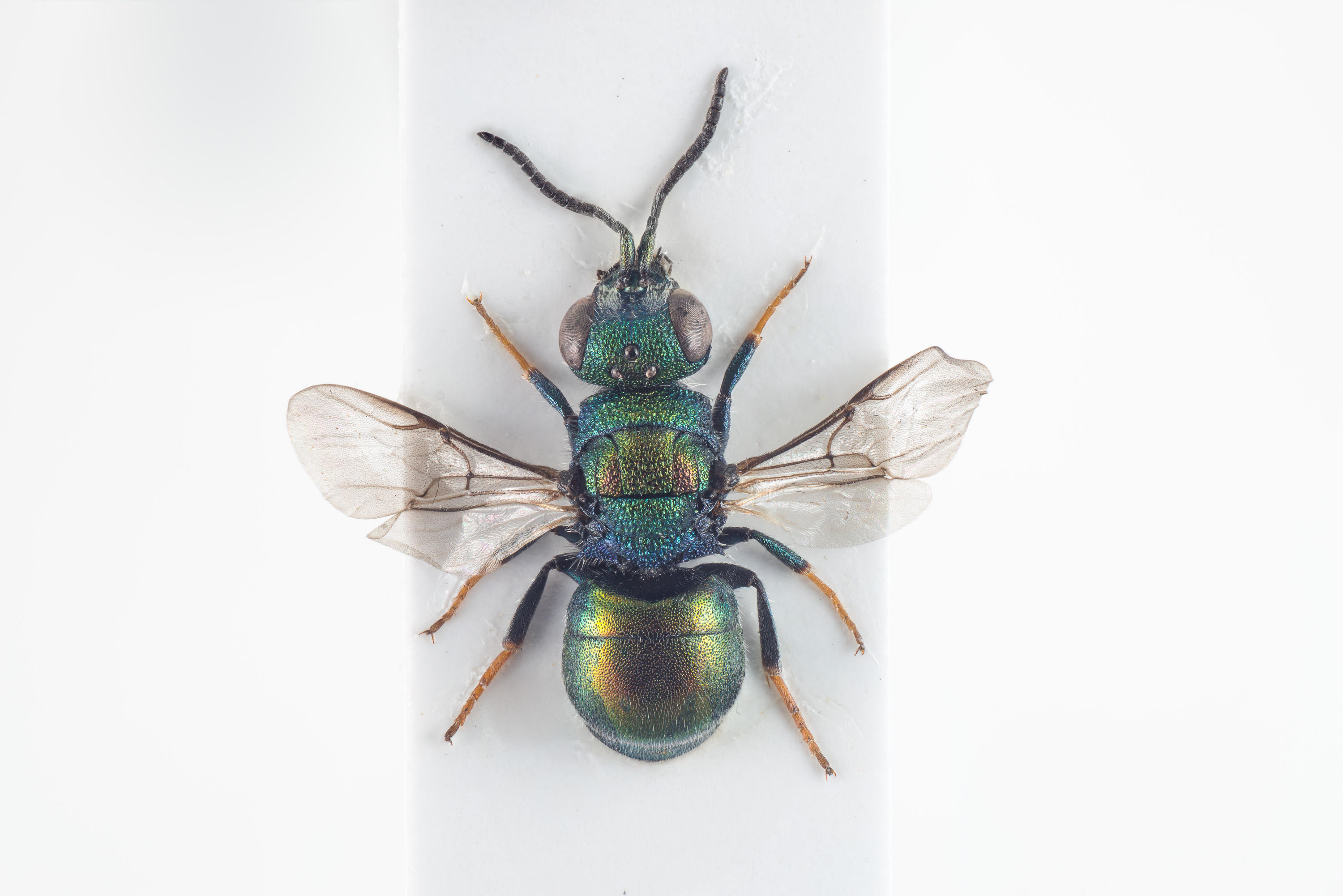
Hedychridium Ardens

Hedychridium is a genus of insects belonging to the family Chrysididae.

Species:

- Hedychridium adventicium
- Hedychridium aereolum
- Hedychridium aheneum
- Hedychridium dimidiatum (Say 1824)
- Hedychridium fletcheri (Bodenstein, 1951)
