= Campodorus elegans =

Scientific classification
- Kingdom: Animalia
- Phylum: Arthropoda
- Class: Insecta
- Order: Hymenoptera
- Family: Ichneumonidae
- Genus: Campodorus
- Species: C. elegans

Binomial name
- Campodorus elegans (Parfitt, 1882)

Synonyms
- Mesoleius elegans Parfitt 1882; Campodorus pineti (Thomson, 1894) (1893)

Species of wasp

Campodorus elegans is a species of parasitic wasp in the tribe Mesoleiini. It is found in England. The species was transferred from the genus Mesoleius by Shaw and Kasparyan in 2003.
