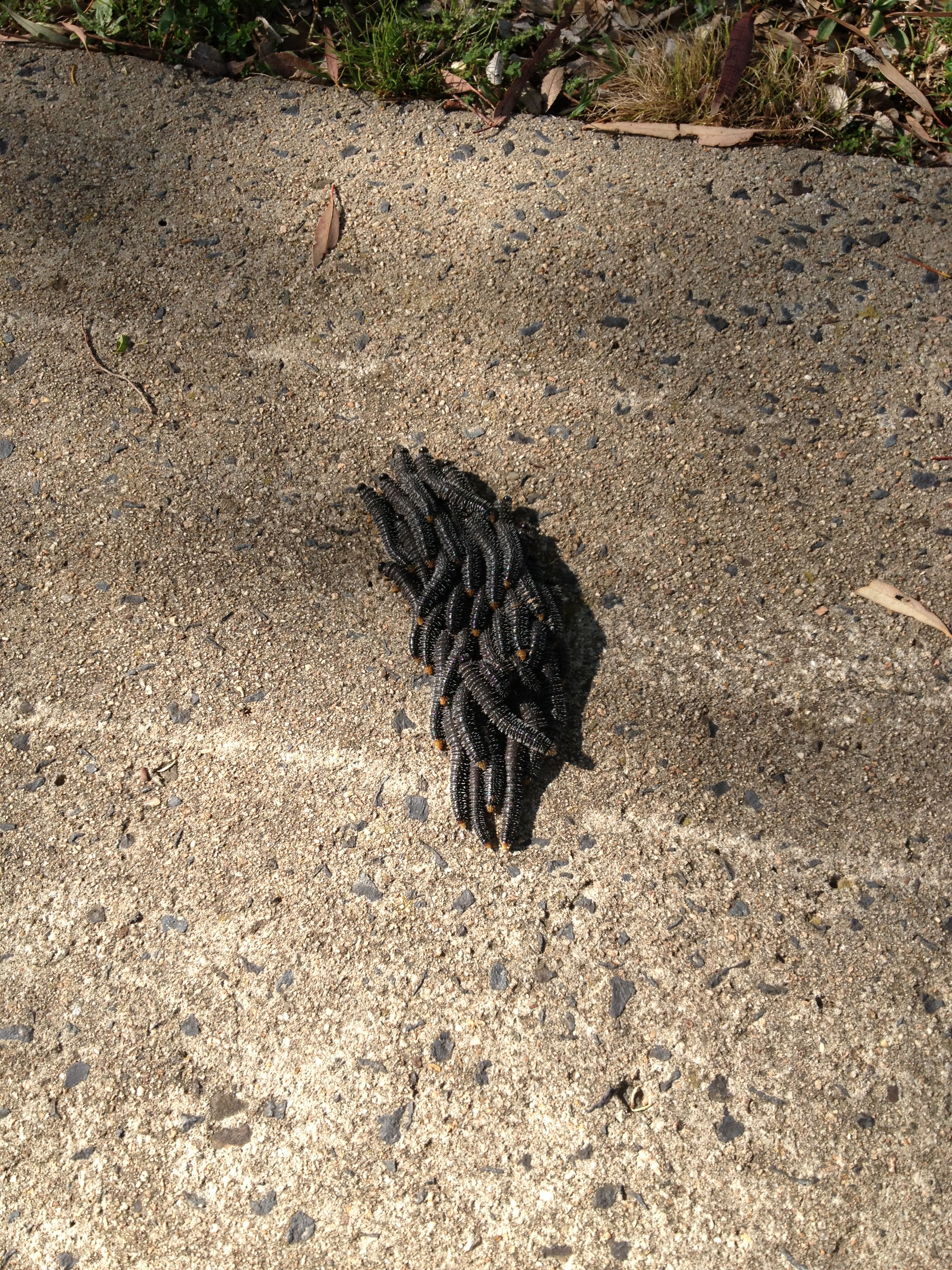
- Larvae on concrete, Bathurst, New South Wales

Scientific classification
- Kingdom: Animalia
- Phylum: Arthropoda
- Clade: Pancrustacea
- Class: Insecta
- Order: Hymenoptera
- Suborder: Symphyta
- Family: Pergidae
- Genus: Perga
- Species: P. affinis

Binomial name
- Perga affinis Kirby, 1882

= Spitfire sawfly =

Species of sawfly

The spitfire sawfly (Perga affinis) is a species of hymenopteran insect in the family Pergidae; within sub-family Perginae. It is found in the Eastern states of Australia (SA, VIC, NSW, south-east QLD and TAS) and grows to 22 mm (0.87 in) in length with two pairs of honey-colored wings up to 40 mm (1.6 in) in wingspan. Another very closely related species is Perga dorsalis. The females of the two species can only be distinguished by close analysis of the hairs along the ovipositor sheaths.

The sawfly derives its name from the saw-like ovipositor of the female, which is used to open holes in the plant within which she lays her eggs. While closely related to wasps, sawflies lack both the narrow waists and stings of wasps.

Although the adults of this sawfly species are not often seen, the larvae are quite conspicuous as they grow larger and congregate in gregarious groups. The larvae are up to 80 mm (3.1 in) long and somewhat resemble a typical caterpillar. Larvae are usually seen during the day in groups on the branches and stems of Eucalyptus trees. At night, they disperse to eat leaves of the host plants. When threatened, the larvae raise their heads and eject a strong-smelling, yellow-green liquid consisting predominantly of eucalyptus oil, to deter predators. This action gives them their common name of spitfires.

== Description ==
The larvae vary from dark blue or black to yellow and brown, and are up to 80 mm (3.1 in) long. The body is sparsely covered with short white bristles. During the day, the larvae congregate in clusters of 20 to 30 for protection and disperse at night to feed. The adults are mainly black or brown, with yellowish markings and are about 25 mm (0.98 in) long. The larvae of this species are indistinguishable from other closely related species and genera, in subfamily Perginae. Only adult females are identifiable to species by visual means.

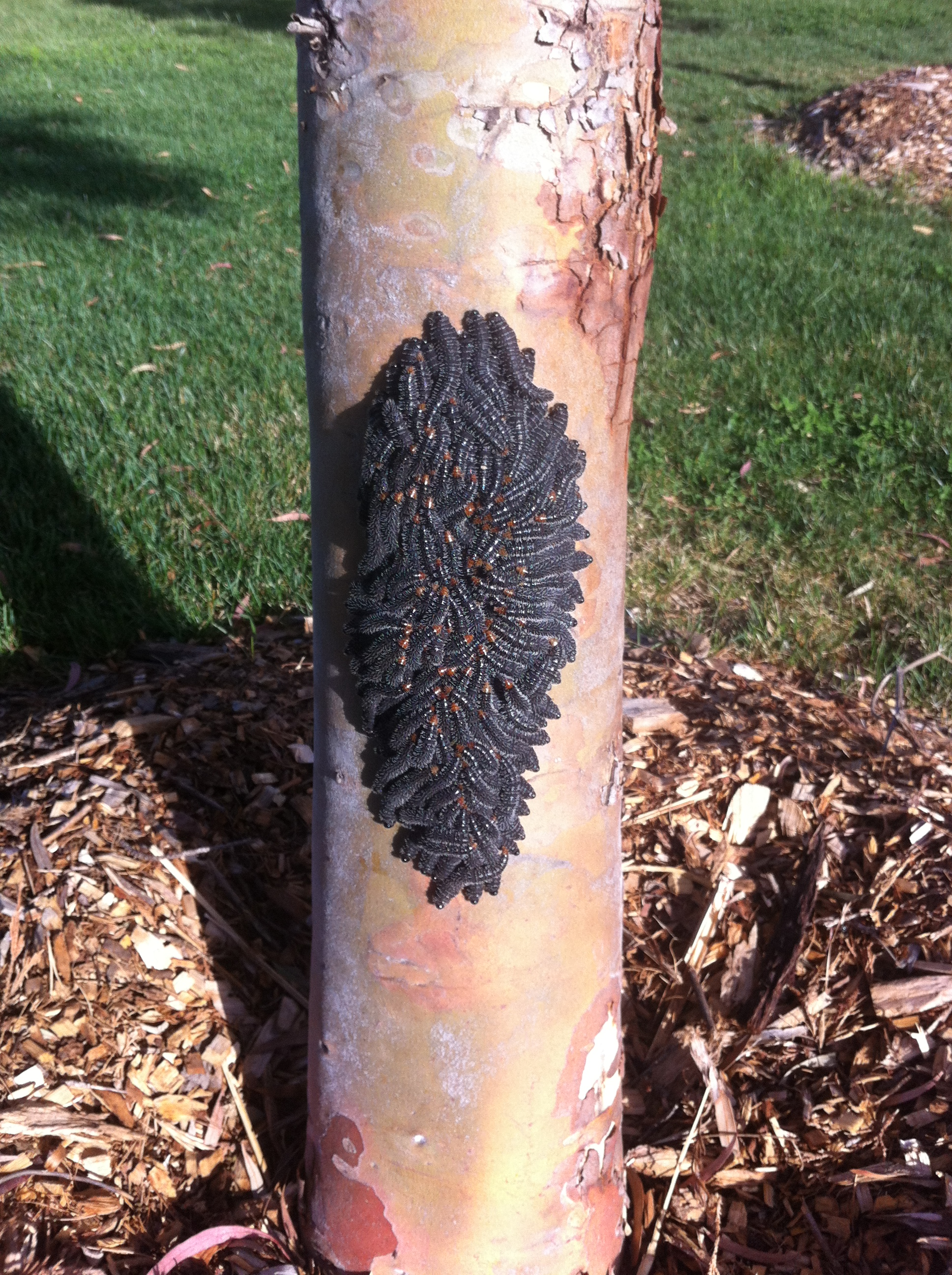
Spitfire caterpillars on tree trunk, 1 Oct 2012, Forde ACT

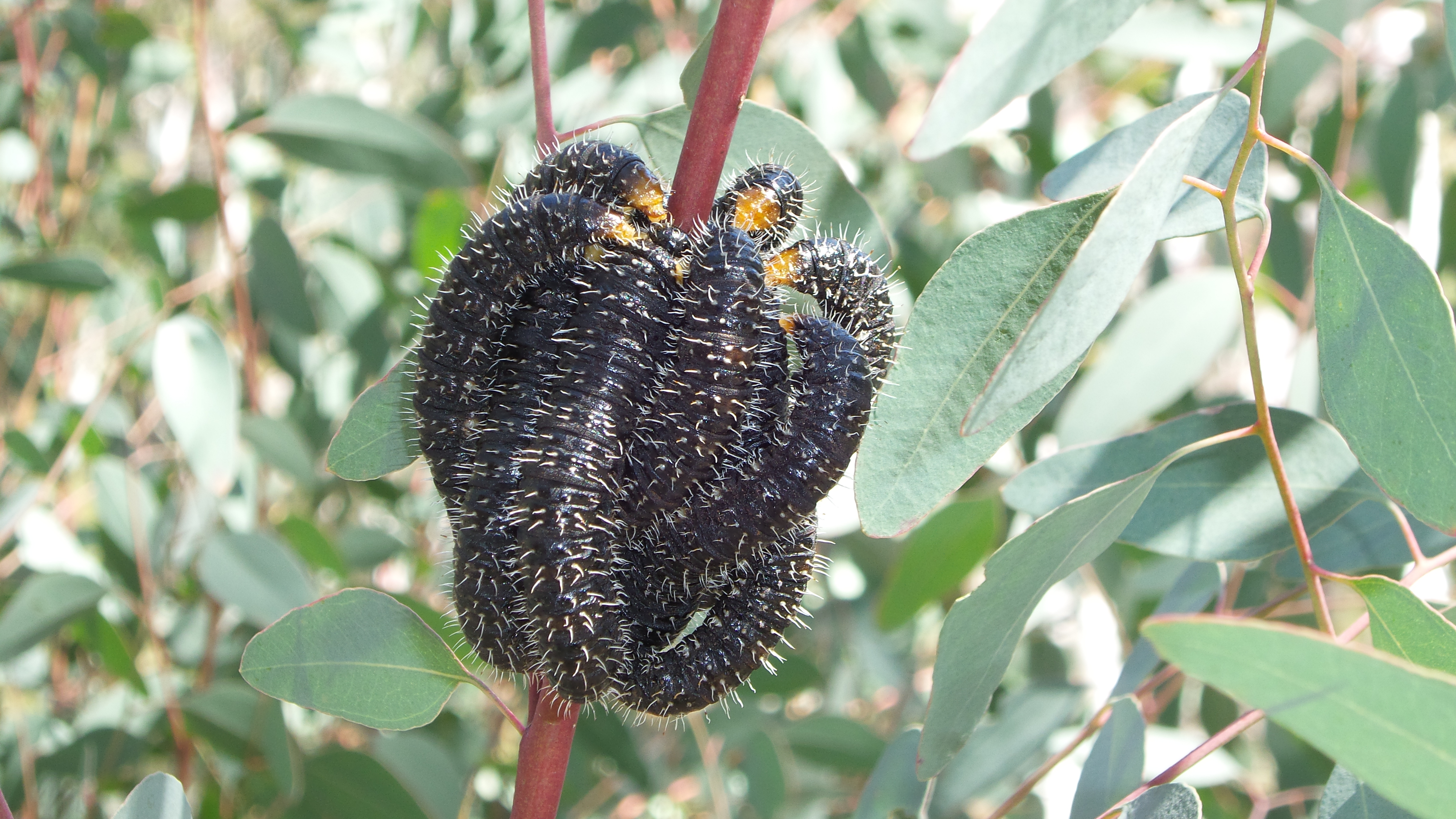
Spitfire caterpillars on eucalypt stem, 27 September 2017, Cooyal NSW

== Life cycle ==
The adults are found from about January to May, though mainly in autumn. Eggs are laid under leaf surfaces with the saw-like ovipositor. The larvae are mainly active during late winter and spring and enter the soil to pupate, usually in mid-spring. Pupation takes place in strong, paper-like cocoons, which are often clustered several centimetres deep in the soil. The pupal stage may extend over two or three years before the adult emerges.

== Damage ==
Larvae of spitfires feed on the foliage of young trees and regrowth stems, and can strip the branches of foliage, particularly at the tops. This is usually replaced during the spring-summer flush of leaf growth. Serious retardation of high growth may result from repeated attack, but host death is unusual.

== Control ==
This defoliator rarely causes widespread damage, but where the clusters of larvae are accessible, the simplest method of control is to remove and destroy them during the day. Several parasitic wasps also have some controlling effect.
