= Protarchus =

Protarchus may refer to:

- Protarchus (sophist), Ancient Greek sophist
- Protarchus (wasp), a genus of wasps in the family Ichneumonidae
