= Campodorus =

Scientific classification
- Kingdom: Animalia
- Phylum: Arthropoda
- Class: Insecta
- Order: Hymenoptera
- Family: Ichneumonidae
- Subfamily: Ctenopelmatinae
- Tribe: Mesoleiini
- Genus: Campodorus; Förster, 1869

Species
- See text

Genus of wasps

Campodorus is a genus of parasitic wasps in the tribe Mesoleiini.

== Species ==
- Campodorus abietinus
- Campodorus aemulus
- Campodorus aequabilis
- Campodorus agarcin
- Campodorus agilis
- Campodorus aglaia
- Campodorus alaskensis
- Campodorus almaatensis
- Campodorus alticola
- Campodorus amictus
- Campodorus aquilonaris
- Campodorus arctor
- Campodorus assiduus
- Campodorus astutus
- Campodorus atripes
- Campodorus atrofemorator
- Campodorus autumnalis
- Campodorus axillaris
- Campodorus barbator
- Campodorus belokobylskii
- Campodorus boreator
- Campodorus bovei
- Campodorus caligatus
- Campodorus callidulus
- Campodorus celator
- Campodorus ciliator
- Campodorus ciliatus
- Campodorus circumspectus
- Campodorus clypealis
- Campodorus clypeatus
- Campodorus commotus
- Campodorus contiguus
- Campodorus convexus
- Campodorus corrugatus
- Campodorus crassipes
- Campodorus crassitarsis
- Campodorus crassitarsus
- Campodorus curtitarsis
- Campodorus dauricus
- Campodorus deletus
- Campodorus difformis
- Campodorus dorsalis
- Campodorus efferus
- Campodorus elegans
- Campodorus elini
- Campodorus epachthoides
- Campodorus euurae
- Campodorus exiguus
- Campodorus facialis
- Campodorus fennicus
- Campodorus flavescens
- Campodorus flavicinctus
- Campodorus flavipes
- Campodorus flavomaculatus
- Campodorus formosus
- Campodorus fraudator
- Campodorus fuscipes
- Campodorus gallicator
- Campodorus gallicus
- Campodorus genator
- Campodorus gilvilabris
- Campodorus glyptus
- Campodorus gracilipes
- Campodorus haematodes
- Campodorus hamulus
- Campodorus holmgreni
- Campodorus humerellus
- Campodorus hyperboreus
- Campodorus ignavus
- Campodorus immarginatus
- Campodorus incidens
- Campodorus infidus
- Campodorus insularis
- Campodorus intermedius
- Campodorus kukakensis
- Campodorus kunashiricus
- Campodorus labytnangi
- Campodorus laevipectus
- Campodorus languidulus
- Campodorus latiscapus
- Campodorus liosternus
- Campodorus lituratus
- Campodorus lobatus
- Campodorus longicaudatus
- Campodorus longicornutus
- Campodorus lucidator
- Campodorus luctuosus
- Campodorus maculicollis
- Campodorus marginalis
- Campodorus marginator
- Campodorus mediosanguineus
- Campodorus melanogaster
- Campodorus melanopygus
- Campodorus meridionalis
- Campodorus micropunctatus
- Campodorus minutator
- Campodorus mixtus
- Campodorus modestus
- Campodorus molestus
- Campodorus mollis
- Campodorus monticola
- Campodorus mordax
- Campodorus nematicida
- Campodorus nigridens
- Campodorus nigriventris
- Campodorus nikandrovskii
- Campodorus nubilis
- Campodorus obscurator
- Campodorus obtusus
- Campodorus orientalis
- Campodorus paradiesensis
- Campodorus patagiatus
- Campodorus pectinator
- Campodorus pequenitor
- Campodorus perspicuus
- Campodorus pervicax
- Campodorus picens
- Campodorus pictipes
- Campodorus pineti
- Campodorus polaris
- Campodorus riphaeus
- Campodorus rubens
- Campodorus rubidus
- Campodorus sakhalinator
- Campodorus sanguinator
- Campodorus savinskii
- Campodorus scapularis
- Campodorus semipunctus
- Campodorus sexcarinatus
- Campodorus signator
- Campodorus spurius
- Campodorus stenocerus
- Campodorus subarctor
- Campodorus subfasciatus
- Campodorus suomi
- Campodorus suspicax
- Campodorus taigator
- Campodorus tenebrosus
- Campodorus tenuitarsis
- Campodorus thalia
- Campodorus torvus
- Campodorus transbaikalicus
- Campodorus tristis
- Campodorus ucrainicus
- Campodorus ultimus
- Campodorus ussuriensis
- Campodorus variegatus
- Campodorus versutus
- Campodorus vestergreni
- Campodorus vicinus
- Campodorus viduus
- Campodorus yakutator
