= John O. Westwood =

English entomologist and archaeologist (1805–1893)

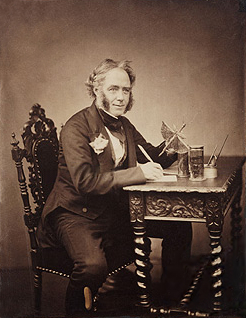
- Westwood, c. 1850
- Born: John Obadiah Westwood; 22 December 1805; Sheffield, England
- Died: 2 January 1893 (aged 87); Oxford, England
- Known for: Entomology, insect illustrations
- Awards: Royal Medal (1855)

John Obadiah Westwood (22 December 1805 – 2 January 1893) was an English entomologist and archaeologist noted for his artistic talents. He published several illustrated works on insects and antiquities. He was among the first entomologists with an academic position at Oxford University. He was a natural theologian, staunchly anti-Darwinian, and sometimes adopted a quinarian viewpoint. Although he never travelled widely, he described species from around the world on the basis of specimens, especially of the larger, curious, and colourful species obtained by naturalists and collectors in England.

== Life and work ==
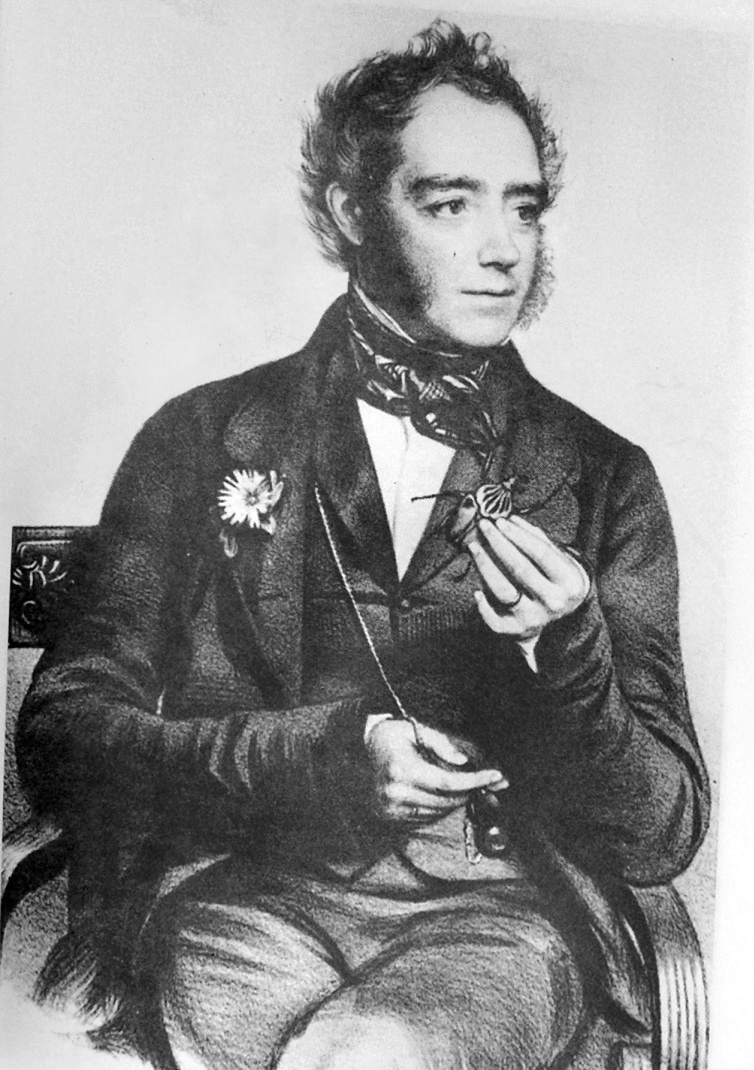
Westwood holding a Goliath beetle

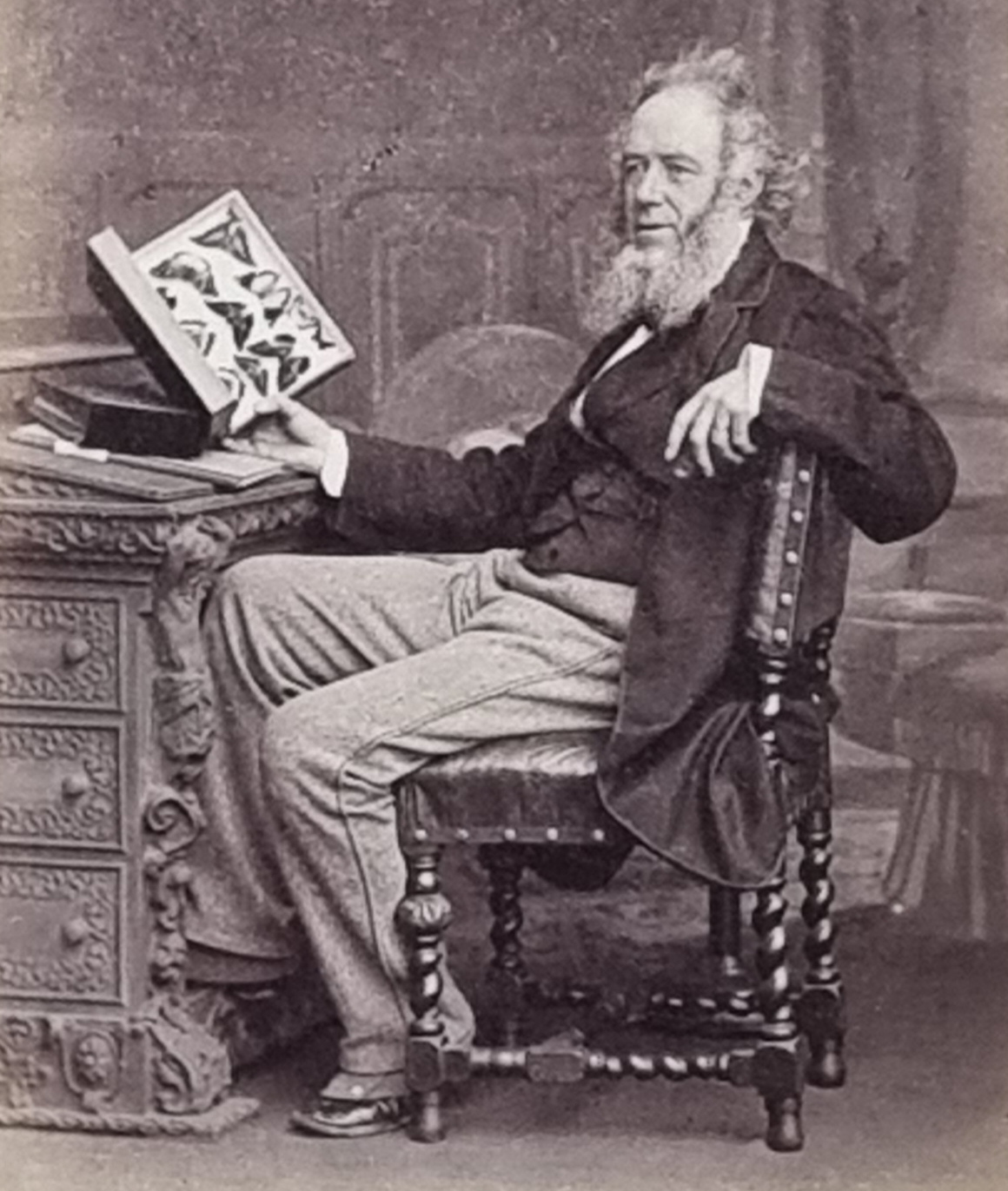
John Obadiah Westwood by Ernest Edwards 1864

John Obadiah Westwood was born into a Quaker family in Sheffield, the son of medal and die maker, John Westwood (1774–1850) and Mary, daughter of Edward Betts. He went to school at the Friends' School, Sheffield and later at Lichfield when the family moved there. He apprenticed briefly to become a solicitor and for a while he worked as a partner in a firm but gave up a career in law for his interests. In his spare time he studied Anglo-Saxon and medieval manuscripts and earned a living by illustrating and writing. His early works included reproductions of old manuscripts and illuminations. In 1824, he met the entomologist Reverend Frederick William Hope for the first time and they became close friends. In 1833, Westwood and Hope were founding members of the Entomological Society of London and Westwood served as its secretary in 1834. In the same year, Hope had his insect collections organized by Westwood. This allowed Westwood to examine and describe insects from around the world.

When Hope decided to gift away his collections to Oxford University in 1849 he got Westwood to be appointed a curator of the collections. Westwood was appointed in 1857 and he donated his own insect specimens to the Hope Collection. Hope worked on setting up a new zoology chair endowed an entomological position in Oxford University, Westwood was the first nominee and selected as Hope professor in 1861. He received an MA by decree in 1861 and joined Magdalen College, Oxford. Among the prominent writers and naturalists he associated with was James Rennie, whom he assisted in the editing of Gilbert White's The Natural History and Antiquities of Selborne in 1833. In his early writings he was influenced by the quinarian system, but tended to be a general natural theologian. Although he worked on insect classification and diversity for more than thirty years from the publication of Darwin's Origin of Species, he never accepted ideas on evolution. Darwin even suspected that an anonymous author of a bad review of his book in the Athenæum to have been Westwood. That review was however by John Leifchild although Westwood remained a critic of Darwin to the extent that he proposed a "permanent endowment of a lecturer [at Oxford] to combat the errors of Darwinism". He considered mimetic resemblances of insects as freaks of nature. Westwood was succeeded in the Hope chair by E.B. Poulton who adopted evolutionary views. Westwood was among the first to attempt an estimate of the total number of species of insects which he put at half a million.

== Family, learned societies and later life ==
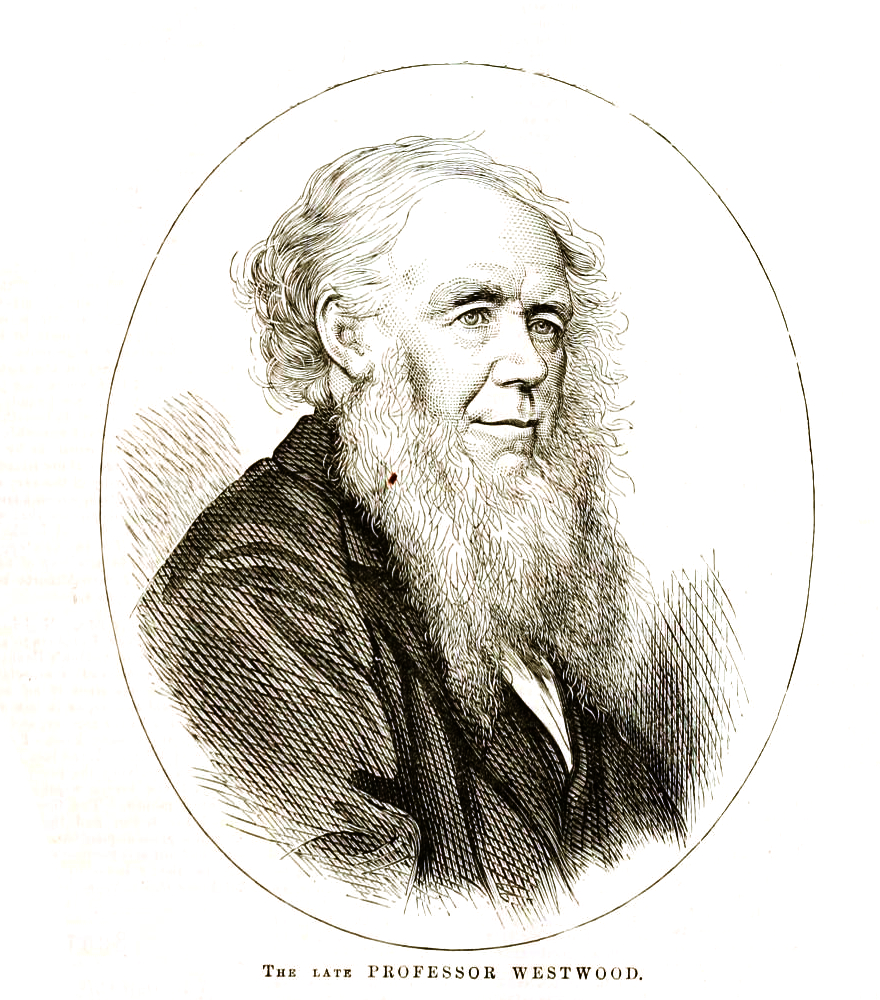
Westwood in later life

In 1839, Westwood married Eliza Richardson (d. 1882), who accompanied him on all his archæological tours, and who assisted in making sketches and rubbings of the inscribed stones for his 'Lapidarium Walliæ.' Westwood was a Fellow of the Linnean Society (elected 1827) and president of the Entomological Society of London (1852–1853). He received the Royal Society's medal, based on recommendations from many including Darwin, in 1855 for his work on insects. In 1883 he was honoured in the Jubilee year of the Entomological Society as honorary life president of the society. He was also on the staff of the Gardener's Chronicle serving as a bridge between gardeners and entomologists. He was elected as a member to the American Philosophical Society in 1883.

A fall in 1884 led to an arm injury that ended his studies. On 30 December 1892, not long after returning home from a convention in London, Westwood had suddenly collapsed of a cerebral haemorrhage, which left him hospitalised. He slipped into a coma one day later and died on 2 January 1893. His funeral took place on 6 January 1893, and he was interred in St Sepulchre's Cemetery, Oxford.

== Legacy ==
Portrait by William Riviere

The J. O. Westwood Medal, awarded every two years by the Royal Entomological Society, is named in his honour. The ichneumon wasp genus Westwoodia was erected by Brullé in 1846. A vestry in St Andrew's Church, Sandford-on-Thames was constructed in 1893 in his honour.

== Works ==
Westwood's works include:

=== General ===
- Class Insecta. In Griffith, E. The animal kingdom arranged in conformity with its organisation by the Baron Cuvier. Whittaker, London. 796 pp (1832).
- An introduction to the modern classification of insects. Longman, Orme, Brown, Green, and Longmans, London. (−1839)
- The Entomologists Textbook. (1838).
- Synopsis of the genera of British Insects. Longman, Orme, Brown, Green, and Longmans, London. 158 pp. (1840) The full text
- The Cabinet of Oriental Entomology (1848)
- Arcana Entomologica, or illustrations of new, rare, and interesting exotic insects. Volumes 1 & 2. [Volume 1 published in parts, 1841-1843. Volume 2 published in parts, 1843-1845].
- Thesaurus Entomologicus Oxoniensis: or illustrations of new, rare and interesting insects, for the most part coloured, in the collections presented to the University of Oxford by the Rev. F.W. Hope. London: McMillan & Co., i–xxiv, 205 pp., 40 pls (1873-1874) [Published in 4 parts: Part I, pp. 1–56 in 1873; parts II-IV in 1874].

=== Hymenoptera ===
- Description of several British forms amongst the parasitic hymenopterous insects. London & Edinburgh Phil. Mag. J. Sci. 1: 127–129 (1832). The full text
- Further notices of the British parasitic hymenopterous insects; together with the "Transactions of a fly with a long tail," observed by Mr. E. W. Lewis; and additional observations. Magazine of Natural History 6: 414–421. (1833).
- Descriptions of several new British forms amongst the parasitic hymenopterous insects. London & Edinburgh Phil. Mag. J. Sci. 2: 443–445 (1833). The full text
- Descriptions of several new British forms amongst the parasitic hymenopterous insects. London & Edinburgh Phil. Mag. J. Sci. 3: 342–344 1833.
- "...Hymenopterous Insects, which Mr Westwood regarded as new to science" Proceedings of the Zoological Society of London 3: 68–72. (1835) The full text
- Characters of new genera and species of hymenopterous insects. Proceedings of the Zoological Society of London 3: 51–72 (1835). The full text
- Observations on the genus Typhlopone, with descriptions of several exotic species of ants. Annals and Magazine of Natural History 6: 81–89 (1840) The full text.
- On the Evaniidae and some allied genera of hymenopterous insects. Annals and Magazine of Natural History (1)7: 535–538 (1841).
- Monograph of the hymenopterous group, Dorylides. Arcana Entomologica 1(5): 73–80 (1842) The full text.
- On Evania and some allied genera of hymenopterous insects. Transactions of the Royal Entomological Society of London 3(4): 237–278 (1843).
- Description of a new species of the hymenopterous genus Aenictus, belonging to the Dorylidae. Journal of Proceedings of the Entomological Society of London 1840–1846: 85. (1843). The full text.
- Description of a new dorylideous insect from South Africa, belonging to the genus Aenictus. Transactions of the Entomological Society of London 4: 237–238 (1847).
- Description of the "Driver" ants, described in the preceding article. Transactions of the Entomological Society of London 5: 16–18 (1847).
- Descriptions of some new species of exotic Hymenoptera belonging to Evania and the allied genera, being a supplement to a memoir on those insects published in the third volume of the Transactions of the Entomological Society. Transactions of the Royal Entomological Society of London (2)1: 213–234. (1851).
- Descriptions of some new species of short-tongued bees belonging to the genus Nomia. Transactions of the Entomological Society of London 1875: 207–222. (1875).
- Contributions to fossil entomology. Quarterly Journal of the Geological Society of London 10: 378–396 1854. The full text

=== Lepidoptera ===
- With Henry Noel Humphreys. British Moths and Their Transformations. London: William Smith, 1843–1845. 2 Volumes.

=== Mantodea ===
- Revisio Insectorum Familiae Mantidarum, speciebus novis aut minus cognitis descriptis et delineatis. – Revisio Mantidarum. Gurney & Jackson, London. 55pp. & 14 plates. (1889).

=== Phasmida ===
- Insectorum Arachnoidumque Decades duo. Zoological Journal, 5(10): 440-453, pl. 22. (1834).
- Catalogue of the Orthopterous Insects in the Collection of British Museum. Part I: Phasmidae. British Museum, London. (1859).
- Heteropteryx hopei, Westw. Transactions of the Entomological Society of London, 2(3): 16-17.(1864).

=== Crustacea ===
- Bate, C. Spence; Westwood, J.O. (1863–1868). A History of the British Sessile-eyed Crustacea. London: John van Voorst. (in 2 volumes)
