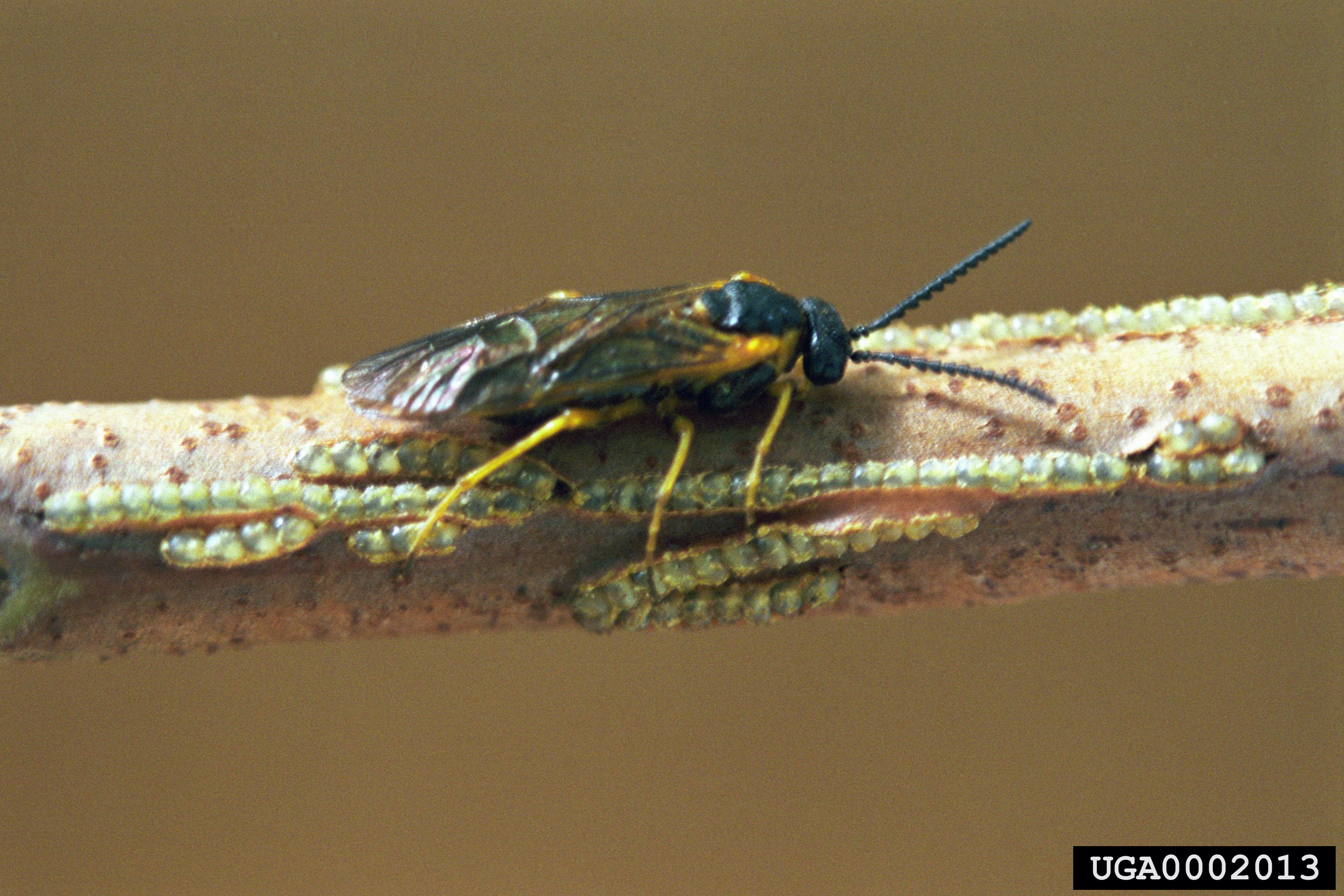
- Female Heteroperreyia hubrichi, guarding her eggs

Scientific classification
- Kingdom: Animalia
- Phylum: Arthropoda
- Clade: Pancrustacea
- Class: Insecta
- Order: Hymenoptera
- Suborder: Symphyta
- Family: Pergidae
- Genus: Heteroperreyia
- Species: H. hubrichi

Binomial name
- Heteroperreyia hubrichi Malaise, 1937

= Heteroperreyia hubrichi =

Species of sawfly

Heteroperreyia hubrichi is a South American sawfly that feeds on plants of the genus Schinus.

== Role in biological control ==
Brazilian pepper trees (Schinus) are trees native to South America, whose ornamental introduction lead to a process of biological invasion in more than 20 countries. In US states of Florida and Hawaii, the introduction of the sawfly H. hubrichi was proposed as a controlling mechanism against the Brazilian pepper tree's dispersion, due to the high host specificity it shows. In Florida, host-specificity tests with commercially valuable and native/endangered tree species were conducted and were positive, so a request to the technical advisory group on the Introduction of Biological Control Agents of Weeds about the introduction was approved, however, as H. hubrichi is known to produce cytotoxic peptides as do other pergid sawflies, concern about cattle intoxication probably stopped it. Results in Hawaii showed potential risk to endangered Rhus sandwicensis.

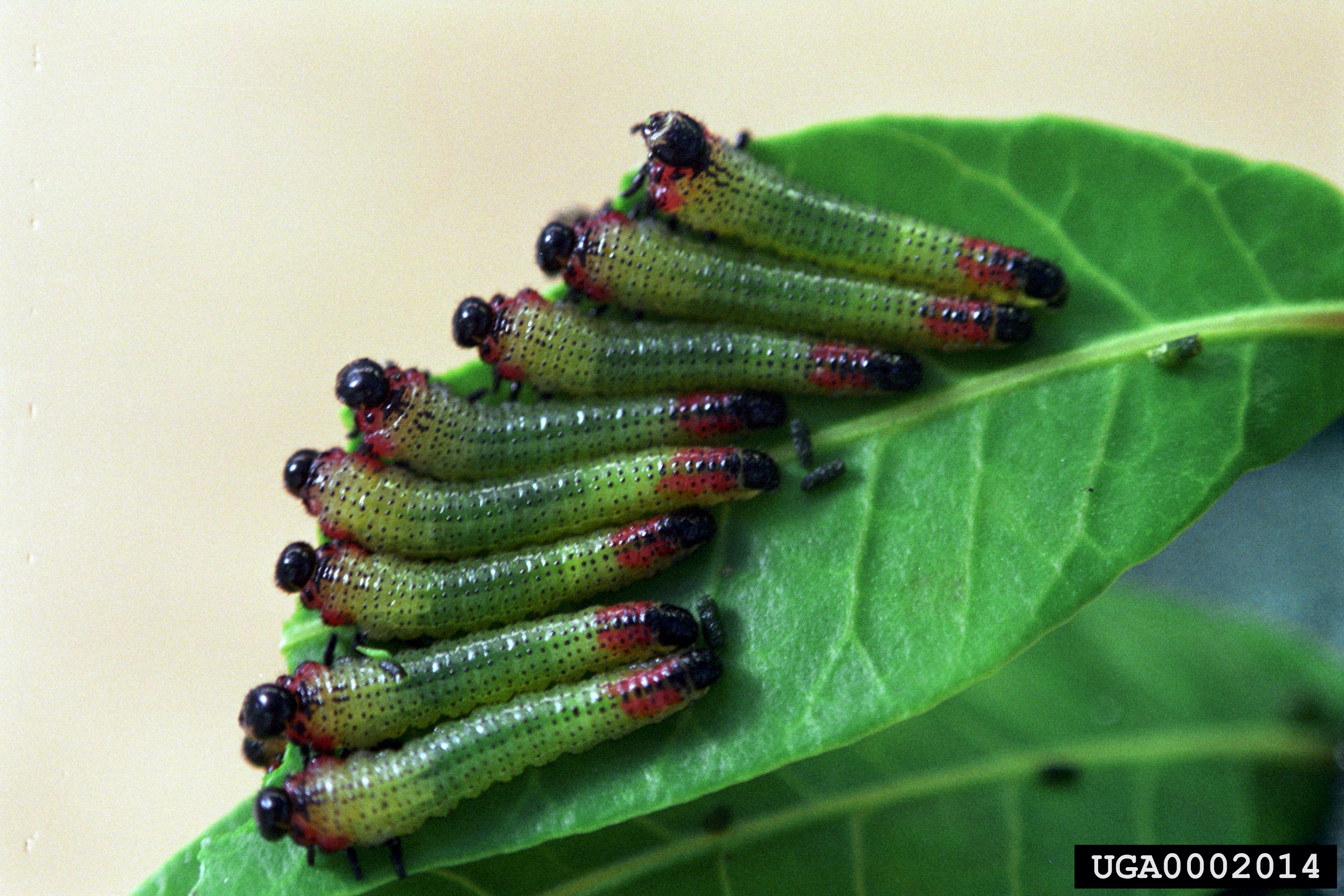
Larvae of H. hubrichi, feeding on S. longifolia leaf
