= Westwoodia =

Scientific classification
- Kingdom: Animalia
- Phylum: Arthropoda
- Class: Insecta
- Order: Hymenoptera
- Family: Ichneumonidae
- Subfamily: Ctenopelmatinae
- Tribe: Westwoodiini
- Genus: Westwoodia; Brullé, 1846

Genus of parasitoid wasps

Westwoodia is a genus of parasitoid wasps in the subfamily Ctenopelmatinae. A neotropical genus of butterflies was known as Westwoodia but is now referred to as Xenandra.

== Description and distribution ==
The genus is endemic to Australia and has been previously documented in northeastern, southeastern and western Australia. Like other genera in the subfamily Ctenopelmatinae, Westwoodia are koinobiont endoparasitoids of sawflies. All known Westwoodia host species are sawflies in the subfamily Perginae.

== Species ==
- Westwoodia longipes
- Westwoodia ruficeps
