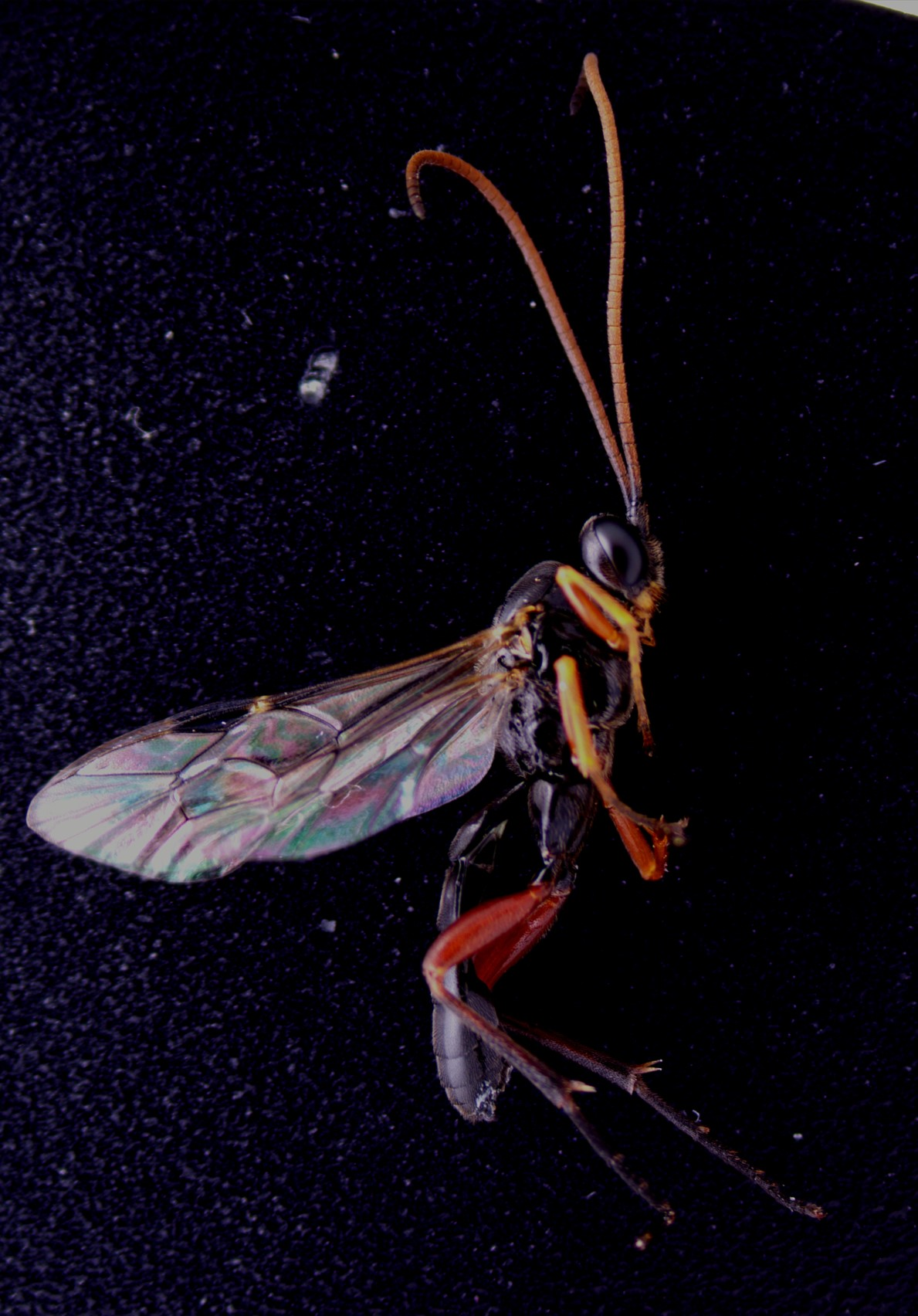
- Lateral view of Xenoschesis fulvicornis

Scientific classification
- Kingdom: Animalia
- Phylum: Arthropoda
- Clade: Pancrustacea
- Class: Insecta
- Order: Hymenoptera
- Family: Ichneumonidae
- Subfamily: Ctenopelmatinae
- Tribe: Ctenopelmatini; Förster, 1869

Genera
- Ctenopelma, Homaspis, Notopygus, Rhorodes, Satous, Xenoschesis

= Ctenopelmatini =

Tribe of wasps

Ctenopelmatini is a tribe of parasitoid wasps in the subfamily Ctenopelmatinae.

== Genera ==
Ctenopelmatini contains the following genera:

- Ctenopelma
- Homaspis
- Notopygus
- Rhorodes
- Satous
- Xenoschesis
