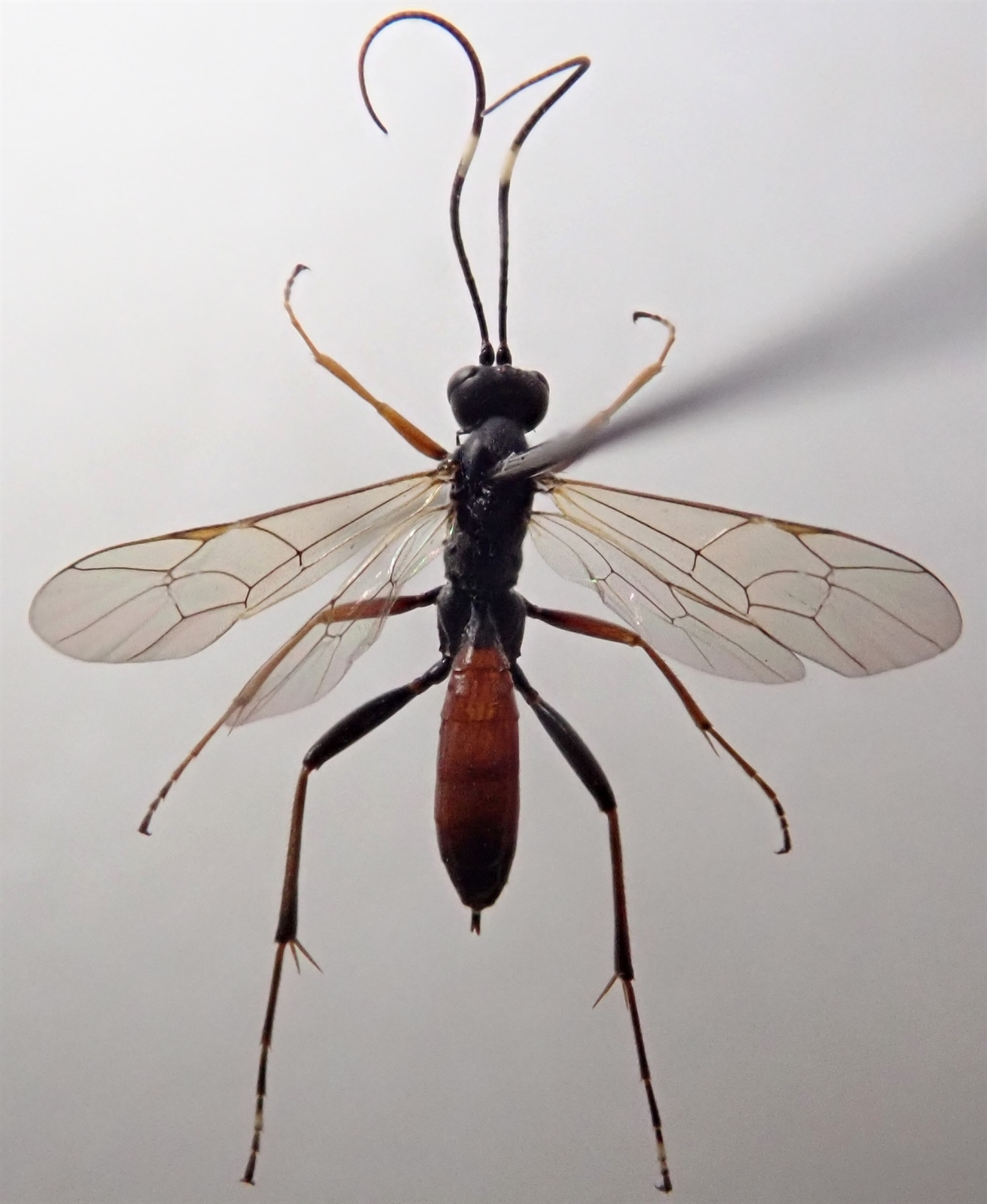
- Euryproctus nemoralis

Scientific classification
- Kingdom: Animalia
- Phylum: Arthropoda
- Class: Insecta
- Order: Hymenoptera
- Family: Ichneumonidae
- Subfamily: Ctenopelmatinae
- Tribe: Euryproctini
- Genus: Euryproctus; Holmgren, 1855

Extant species
- Euryproctus geniculosus; Euryproctus regenerator

= Euryproctus =

Genus of wasps

Euryproctus is a genus of wasps belonging to the family Ichneumonidae.

The genus was first described by Holmgren in 1855.

The genus has a cosmopolitan distribution.

Select species:

- Euryproctus geniculosus
- Euryproctus regenerator
