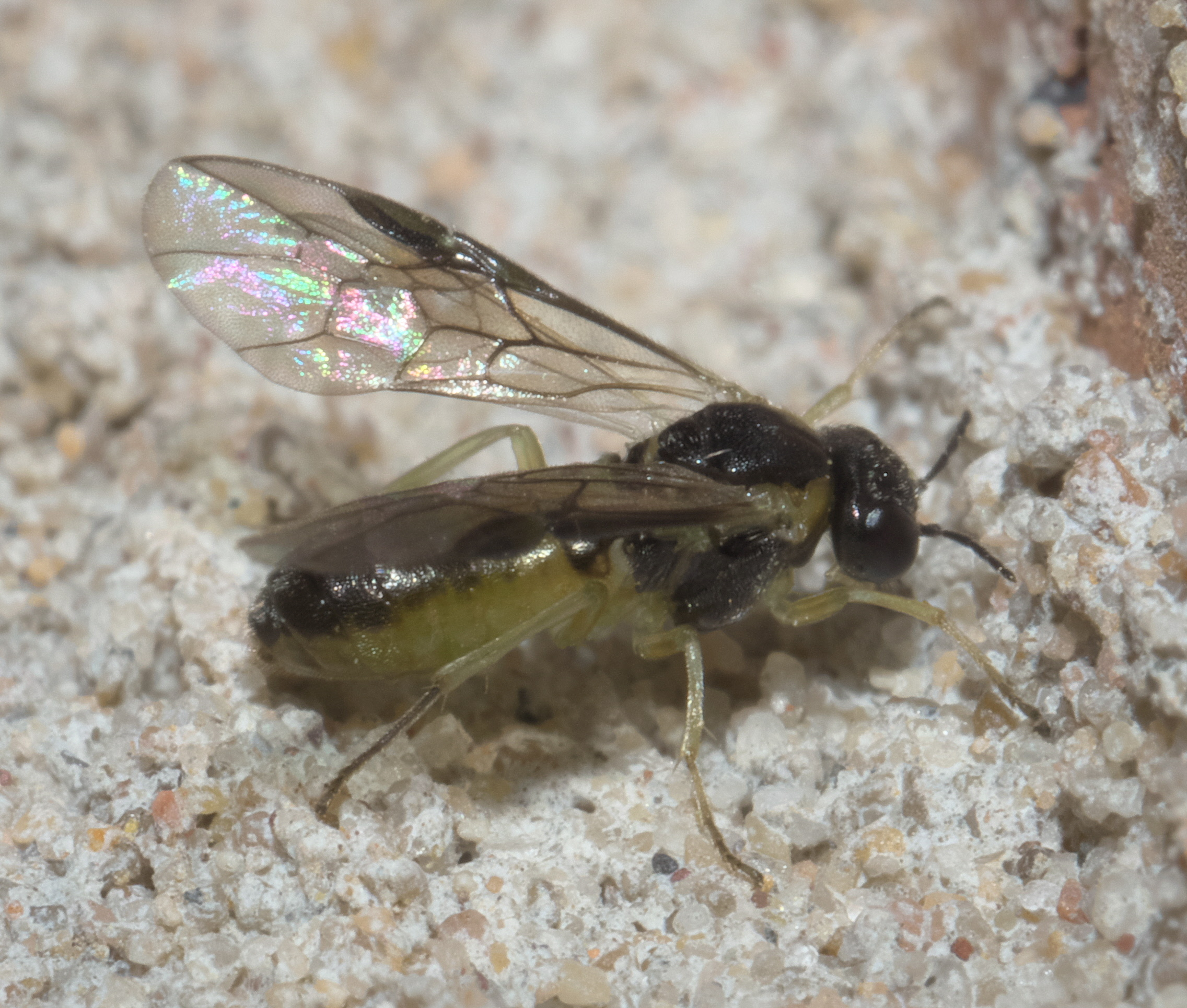

Scientific classification
- Kingdom: Animalia
- Phylum: Arthropoda
- Class: Insecta
- Order: Hymenoptera
- Suborder: Symphyta
- Superfamily: Tenthredinoidea
- Family: Pergidae
- Subfamily: Acordulecerinae
- Genus: Acordulecera; Say, 1836

= Acordulecera =

Genus of sawflies

Acordulecera is a genus of sawflies in the family Pergidae. There are more than 20 described species in Acordulecera.

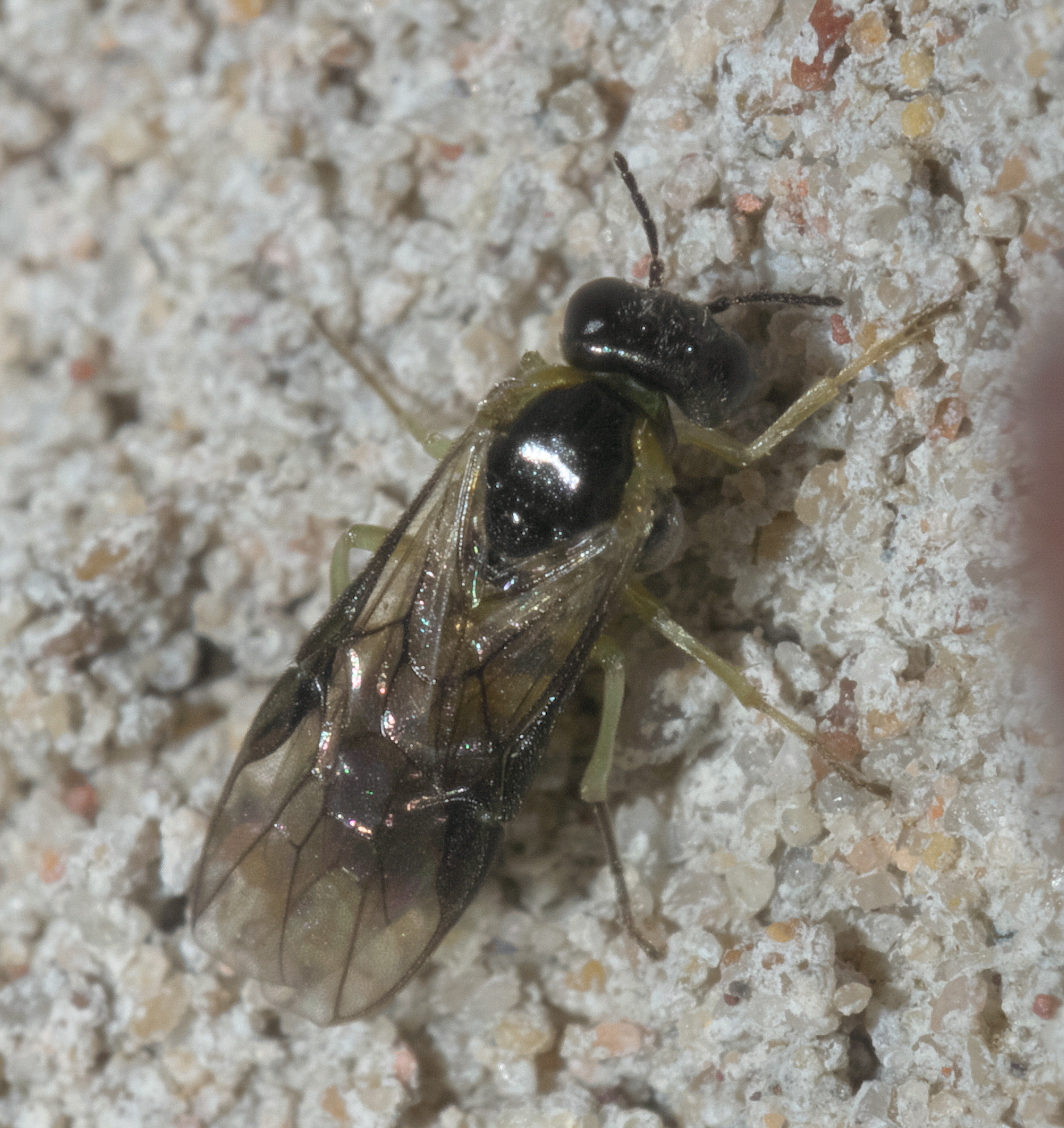

== Species ==
These species belong to the genus Acordulecera:

- Acordulecera algodones Smith, 2010
- Acordulecera antennata Rohwer
- Acordulecera basirufa Rohwer
- Acordulecera brevis Smith 2014
- Acordulecera caryae Rohwer
- Acordulecera chilensis Smith
- Acordulecera comoa Smith 2014
- Acordulecera dorsalis Say, 1836
- Acordulecera ducra Smith, 1980
- Acordulecera erythrogastra Rohwer
- Acordulecera flavipes Rohwer
- Acordulecera foveata Rohwer
- Acordulecera grisselli Smith, 2010
- Acordulecera hicoriae Rohwer
- Acordulecera irwini Smith 2016
- Acordulecera knabi Rohwer
- Acordulecera longica Smith
- Acordulecera maculata
- Acordulecera mellina
- Acordulecera montserratensis Smith
- Acordulecera munroi Smith 1980
- Acordulecera nigrata Rohwer
- Acordulecera nigritarsis Rohwer
- Acordulecera parva Rohwer
- Acordulecera portiae Rohwer
- Acordulecera quercus Rohwer
- Acordulecera sahlbergi (Forsius, 1925)
- Acordulecera scutellata Rohwer
- Acordulecera sonoita Smith, 2010
- Acordulecera tristis Smith 2014
- Acordulecera whittelli Smith, 2010
- Acordulecera willei Smith 1980
