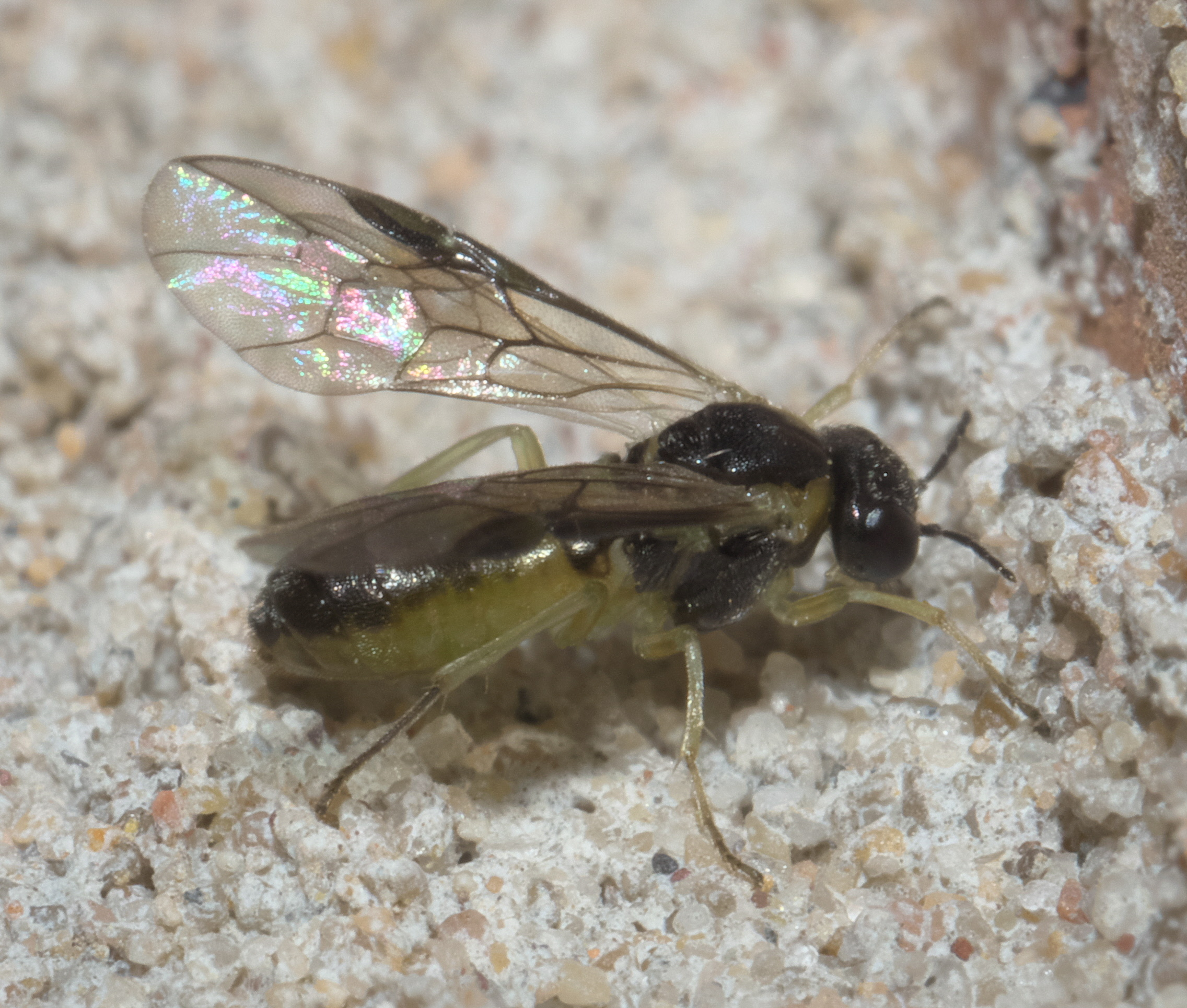
- Acordulecera

Scientific classification
- Domain: Eukaryota
- Kingdom: Animalia
- Phylum: Arthropoda
- Class: Insecta
- Order: Hymenoptera
- Suborder: Symphyta
- Family: Pergidae
- Subfamily: Acordulecerinae

= Acordulecerinae =

Subfamily of sawflies

Acordulecerinae is a subfamily of sawflies in the family Pergidae. There are about 16 genera and more than 100 described species in Acordulecerinae.

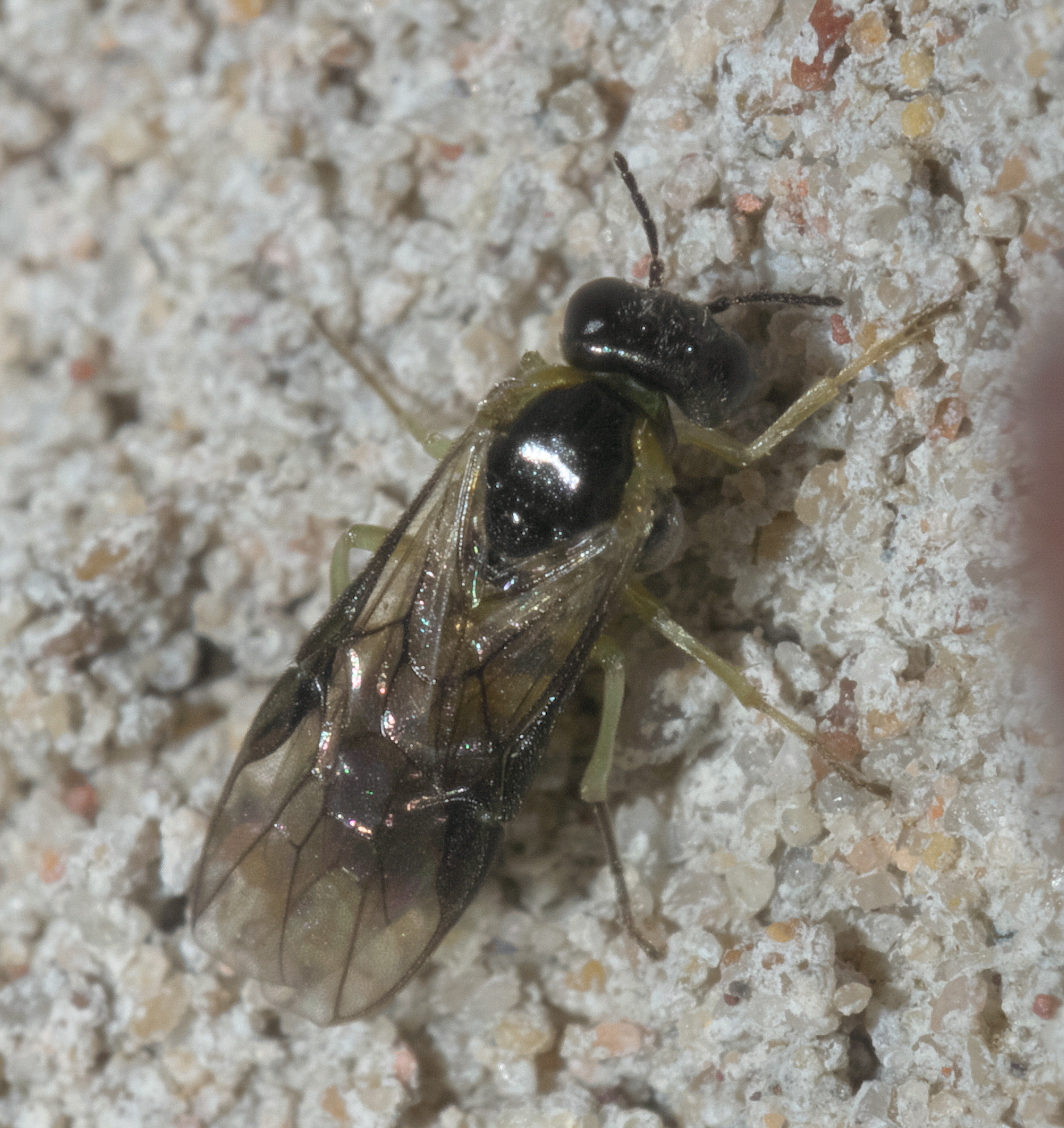
Acordulecera

== Genera ==
These 16 genera belong to the subfamily Acordulecerinae:

- Acordulecera Say, 1836
- Acorduloceridea Rohwer, 1912
- Anathulea Malaise, 1942
- Busalus Smith, 1990
- Caloperga Naumann, 1983
- Ceratoperia Enderlein, 1919
- Corynophilus Kirby, 1882
- Enjijus Smith, 1990
- Giladeus Brèthes, 1920
- Krausius Smith, 2006
- Leptoperga Riek, 1970
- Phylacteophaga Froggatt, 1899
- Quetutus Smith, 1990
- Sutwanus Smith, 1990
- Tequus Smith, 1990
- Truqus Smith, 1990
