= Pergulinae =

Scientific classification
- Domain: Eukaryota
- Kingdom: Animalia
- Phylum: Arthropoda
- Class: Insecta
- Order: Hymenoptera
- Suborder: Symphyta
- Family: Pergidae
- Subfamily: Pergulinae

Subfamily of sawflies

Pergulinae is a subfamily of pergid sawflies in the family Pergidae. There are at least 2 genera and about 19 described species in Pergulinae. They are mostly found in South America and Western Australia

== Genera ==
These two genera belong to the subfamily Pergulinae:

- Haplostegus Konow, 1901
- Pergula Morice, 1918
