= List of Mesoleius species =

This is a list of 161 species in Mesoleius, a genus of ichneumon wasps in the family Ichneumonidae.

== Mesoleius species ==
- Mesoleius abbreviatus Brischke, 1871^{c g}
- Mesoleius abdominalis Brischke, 1871^{c g}
- Mesoleius aceris Kasparyan & Shaw, 2003^{c g}
- Mesoleius admirabilis Kasparyan, 2000^{c g}
- Mesoleius affinis Brischke, 1892^{c g}
- Mesoleius agilis Brischke, 1871^{c g}
- Mesoleius albopictus Brischke, 1892^{c g}
- Mesoleius albotibialis Strobl, 1903^{c g}
- Mesoleius alekhinoi Kasparyan, 2000^{c g}
- Mesoleius altalpinus Bauer, 1985^{c g}
- Mesoleius altissimus Bauer, 1985^{c g}
- Mesoleius analis Brischke, 1878^{c g}
- Mesoleius annulatus Brischke, 1871^{c}
- Mesoleius ardonator Kasparyan, 2000^{c g}
- Mesoleius arduus Kasparyan, 2000^{c g}
- Mesoleius armillatorius (Gravenhorst, 1807)^{c g}
- Mesoleius articularis Davis, 1897^{c g}
- Mesoleius assiduus Holmgren, 1876^{c g}
- Mesoleius ater Kasparyan, 2001^{c g}
- Mesoleius atratus Kasparyan, 2000^{c g}
- Mesoleius audax Davis, 1897^{c g}
- Mesoleius aulicus (Gravenhorst, 1829)^{c g}
- Mesoleius axillaris (Stephens, 1835)^{c g}
- Mesoleius balearicus (Kriechbaumer, 1894)^{c g}
- Mesoleius bipunctatus Brischke, 1871^{c g}
- Mesoleius bisignatus Costa, 1888^{c g}
- Mesoleius brachyacanthus Parfitt, 1881^{c g}
- Mesoleius breviformis Teunissen, 1945^{c g}
- Mesoleius brevipalpis Thomson, 1894^{c g}
- Mesoleius brevis Brischke, 1871^{c g}
- Mesoleius caninae Bridgman, 1886^{c g}
- Mesoleius castaneus Habermehl, 1925^{c}
- Mesoleius chicoutimiensis Provancher, 1888^{c g}
- Mesoleius cingulatus Brischke, 1871^{c g}
- Mesoleius clypearis Brischke, 1878^{c g}
- Mesoleius clypeator Kasparyan, 2000^{c g}
- Mesoleius cognatus Brischke, 1871^{c g}
- Mesoleius comeaui Townes, 1945^{c g}
- Mesoleius conformus Davis, 1897^{c g}
- Mesoleius contractus Holmgren, 1857^{c g}
- Mesoleius coriaceus Holmgren, 1857^{c g}
- Mesoleius cressoni (Davis, 1897)^{c g}
- Mesoleius dubitator Kasparyan, 2000^{c g}
- Mesoleius dubius Holmgren, 1857^{c g}
- Mesoleius dudinka Kasparyan, 2001^{c g}
- Mesoleius dumeticola Teunissen, 1945^{c g}
- Mesoleius efferus Holmgren, 1876^{c g}
- Mesoleius ephippium Tschek, 1869^{c g}
- Mesoleius euphrosyne Teunissen, 1953^{c g}
- Mesoleius excavatus (Provancher, 1875)^{c}
- Mesoleius exsculptus Brischke, 1871^{c g}
- Mesoleius facialis Brischke, 1878^{c g}
- Mesoleius faciator Kasparyan, 2001^{c g}
- Mesoleius filicornis Holmgren, 1876^{c g}
- Mesoleius flavipes Brischke, 1871^{c g}
- Mesoleius flavoguttatus (Gravenhorst, 1829)^{c}
- Mesoleius flavopictus (Gravenhorst, 1829)^{g}
- Mesoleius frenalis Thomson, 1894^{c g}
- Mesoleius frigidor Kasparyan, 2001^{c g}
- Mesoleius frigidus Holmgren, 1857^{c}
- Mesoleius frontatus Thomson, 1894^{c g}
- Mesoleius fulvator Kasparyan, 2000^{c g}
- Mesoleius furax Holmgren, 1857^{g}
- Mesoleius fuscipes Holmgren, 1857^{c g}
- Mesoleius fuscotrochanteratus Strobl, 1903^{c g}
- Mesoleius gelidor Kasparyan, 2000^{c g}
- Mesoleius geniculatus Holmgren, 1857^{c g}
- Mesoleius granulosus Kasparyan, 2000^{c g}
- Mesoleius groenlandicus Roman, 1930^{c g}
- Mesoleius grossulariae (Ratzeburg, 1852)^{c g}
- Mesoleius hamulator Kasparyan, 2000^{c g}
- Mesoleius hirtus Rudow, 1882^{c g}
- Mesoleius hypoleucus Teunissen, 1945^{c g}
- Mesoleius implicator Kasparyan, 2000^{c g}
- Mesoleius incisus Thomson, 1894^{c g}
- Mesoleius infuscator Kasparyan, 2000^{c g}
- Mesoleius insidiosus (Cresson, 1868)^{c g}
- Mesoleius insularis Roman, 1924^{c g}
- Mesoleius integrator (Müller, 1776)^{c g}
- Mesoleius intermedius (Gravenhorst, 1829)^{c g}
- Mesoleius irkutensis Kasparyan, 2000^{c g}
- Mesoleius juvenilis Holmgren, 1857^{c g}
- Mesoleius khasura Kasparyan, 2000^{c g}
- Mesoleius kiruna Kasparyan, 2000^{c g}
- Mesoleius kola Kasparyan, 2000^{c g}
- Mesoleius lapponator Kasparyan, 2000^{c g}
- Mesoleius laricis Teunissen, 1953^{c g}
- Mesoleius latipes Brischke, 1871^{c g}
- Mesoleius lautaretor Kasparyan, 2000^{c g}
- Mesoleius leucomelas Habermehl, 1903^{c g}
- Mesoleius lindemansi Teunissen, 1953^{c g}
- Mesoleius londoko Kasparyan, 2000^{c g}
- Mesoleius lunaris Brischke, 1871^{c g}
- Mesoleius maculator Kasparyan, 2001^{c g}
- Mesoleius maculatus Brischke, 1871^{c g}
- Mesoleius melanius Roman, 1909^{c g}
- Mesoleius melanoleucus (Gravenhorst, 1829)^{c g}
- Mesoleius melanurus Constantineanu, 1973^{c g}
- Mesoleius mica Kasparyan, 2001^{c g}
- Mesoleius minor (Ashmead, 1902)^{c g}
- Mesoleius mollator Kasparyan, 2000^{c g}
- Mesoleius montegratus Bauer, 1985^{c g}
- Mesoleius nigrans Kasparyan, 2001^{c g}
- Mesoleius nigromica Kasparyan, 2001^{c g}
- Mesoleius nigropalpis Brischke, 1871^{c g}
- Mesoleius nimis Heinrich, 1950^{c g}
- Mesoleius nivalis Holmgren, 1857^{c g}
- Mesoleius notator Kasparyan, 2001^{c g}
- Mesoleius obliquus Thomson, 1894^{c g}
- Mesoleius obtusator Kasparyan, 2001^{c g}
- Mesoleius omolon Kasparyan, 2001^{c g}
- Mesoleius opticus (Gravenhorst, 1829)^{c g}
- Mesoleius palmeni Woldstedt, 1874^{c g}
- Mesoleius parumpictus Roman, 1909^{g}
- Mesoleius parvus Holmgren, 1857^{c g}
- Mesoleius perbellus Teunissen, 1945^{c g}
- Mesoleius peronatus (Marshall, 1876)^{c g}
- Mesoleius pertaesor Kasparyan, 2001^{c g}
- Mesoleius pertinax Davis, 1897^{c g}
- Mesoleius phyllotomae Cushman, 1933^{c g}
- Mesoleius picticoxa Thomson, 1894^{c g}
- Mesoleius pictus Brischke, 1871^{c g}
- Mesoleius placidus Holmgren, 1857^{c g}
- Mesoleius pulchranotus Davis, 1897^{c g}
- Mesoleius pusio Holmgren, 1857^{c g}
- Mesoleius pyriformis (Ratzeburg, 1852)^{c}
- Mesoleius robustus (Provancher, 1883)^{c g}
- Mesoleius roepkei Teunissen, 1945^{c g}
- Mesoleius rufopectus (Provancher, 1888)^{c}
- Mesoleius rugipleuris Heinrich, 1952^{c g}
- Mesoleius saami Kasparyan, 2001^{c g}
- Mesoleius scutellaris Rudow, 1886^{c g}
- Mesoleius seida Kasparyan, 2000^{c g}
- Mesoleius sobicola Kasparyan, 2001^{c g}
- Mesoleius spoliatus Teunissen, 1945^{c g}
- Mesoleius stejnegeri Ashmead, 1899^{c g}
- Mesoleius stenostigma Thomson, 1894^{c g}
- Mesoleius strobli Habermehl, 1925^{c g}
- Mesoleius styriacus Heinrich, 1953^{c g}
- Mesoleius subcoriaceus Strobl, 1903^{c g}
- Mesoleius submarginatus (Cresson, 1864)^{c g}
- Mesoleius subroseus Thomson, 1888^{c g}
- Mesoleius tarsalis (Cresson, 1868)^{c}
- Mesoleius tasarensis Kasparyan, 2001^{c g}
- Mesoleius tegulator Kasparyan, 2001^{c g}
- Mesoleius tenthredinis Morley, 1912^{c g b}
- Mesoleius terpeji Kasparyan, 2001^{c g}
- Mesoleius thuringiacus Habermehl, 1925^{c g}
- Mesoleius tibialis Holmgren, 1857^{c g}
- Mesoleius tibiator Kasparyan, 2000^{c g}
- Mesoleius tinctor Kasparyan, 2001^{c g}
- Mesoleius titarensis Kasparyan, 2001^{c g}
- Mesoleius tixi Kasparyan, 2001^{c g}
- Mesoleius tolmachevi Kasparyan, 2001^{c g}
- Mesoleius tornei Kasparyan, 2001^{c g}
- Mesoleius torpescor Kasparyan, 2001^{c g}
- Mesoleius tricoloripes Costa, 1886^{c g}
- Mesoleius trochanteratus Brischke, 1871^{c g}
- Mesoleius urbanus Teunissen, 1945^{c g}
- Mesoleius ussuriensis Kasparyan, 2000^{c g}
- Mesoleius varicoxa Thomson, 1894^{c g}

Data sources: i = ITIS, c = Catalogue of Life, g = GBIF, b = Bugguide.net
