= Westwoodiini =

Scientific classification
- Kingdom: Animalia
- Phylum: Arthropoda
- Clade: Pancrustacea
- Class: Insecta
- Order: Hymenoptera
- Family: Ichneumonidae
- Subfamily: Ctenopelmatinae
- Tribe: Westwoodiini

Tribe of wasps

Westwoodiini is a tribe of parasitoid wasps in the subfamily Ctenopelmatinae.

== Genera ==
Westwoodiini contains the following genera:

- Pergaphaga
- Dictyopheltes
- Hypopheltes
- Westwoodia
