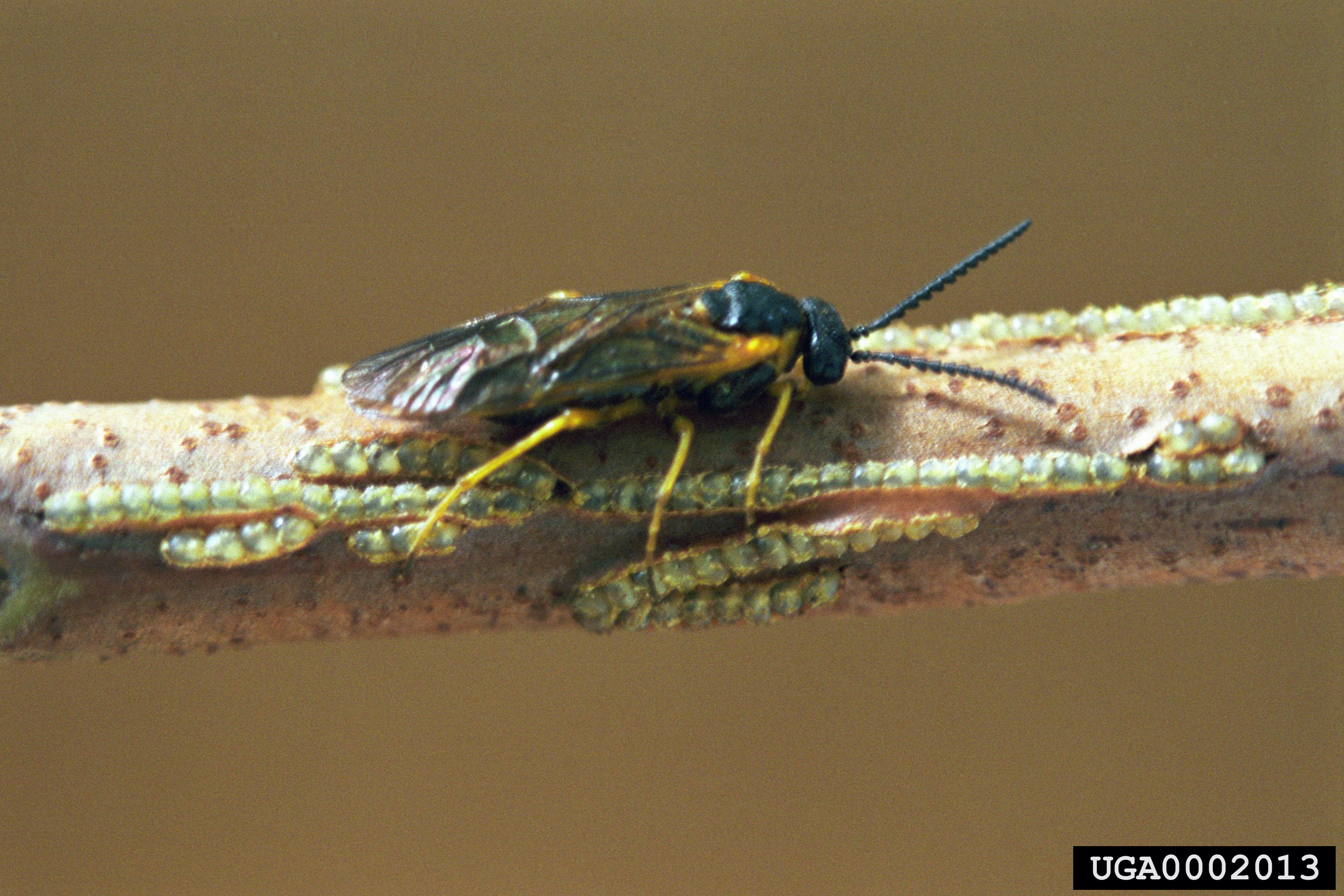
- Heteroperreyia hubrichi

Scientific classification
- Kingdom: Animalia
- Phylum: Arthropoda
- Class: Insecta
- Order: Hymenoptera
- Suborder: Symphyta
- Family: Pergidae
- Subfamily: Perreyiinae; Cameron, 1883

= Perreyiinae =

Subfamily of sawflies

Perreyiinae is a subfamily of sawflies in the family Pergidae. There are about 16 genera and more than 90 described species in Perreyiinae.

== Genera ==
These 16 genera belong to the subfamily Perreyiinae:

- Ancyloneura Cameron, 1877
- Barilochia Malaise, 1955
- Camptoprium Spinola, 1840
- Cladomacra Smith, 1860
- Clarissa Kirby, 1894
- Dalia Schmidt & Brown, 2005
- Decameria Lepeletier de Saint Fargeau & Audinet-Serville, 1828
- Diphamorphos Rohwer, 1910
- Eurys Newman, 1841
- Heteroperreyia Schrottky, 1915
- Neoeurys Rohwer, 1910
- Perreyia Brullé, 1846
- Perreyiella Conde, 1937
- Polyclonus Kirby, 1882
- Warra Benson, 1934
- † Fonsecadalia Mendes et al., 2015
