= Protarchus (wasp) =

Scientific classification
- Domain: Eukaryota
- Kingdom: Animalia
- Phylum: Arthropoda
- Class: Insecta
- Order: Hymenoptera
- Family: Ichneumonidae
- Subfamily: Ctenopelmatinae
- Tribe: Mesoleiini
- Genus: Protarchus; Förster, 1869

Genus of insects

Protarchus is a genus of parasitoid wasps belonging to the family Ichneumonidae.

The species of this genus are found in Europe and North America.

Species:

- Protarchus antiquus Statz, 1936
- Protarchus atrofacies Leblanc, 1999
- Protarchus bolbogaster Leblanc, 1999
