= Philomastiginae =

Scientific classification
- Kingdom: Animalia
- Phylum: Arthropoda
- Class: Insecta
- Order: Hymenoptera
- Suborder: Symphyta
- Family: Pergidae
- Subfamily: Philomastiginae

Subfamily of sawflies

Philomastiginae is a subfamily of sawflies in the family Pergidae. There are at least four genera and six described species in Philomastiginae.

== Genera ==
These four genera belong to the subfamily Philomastiginae:

- Cerospastus Konow, 1899
- Ecopatus Smith, 1990
- Philomastix Froggatt, 1890
- Philoperra Smith, 1995
