= Mesoleiini =

Scientific classification
- Domain: Eukaryota
- Kingdom: Animalia
- Phylum: Arthropoda
- Class: Insecta
- Order: Hymenoptera
- Family: Ichneumonidae
- Subfamily: Ctenopelmatinae
- Tribe: Mesoleiini; Thomson, 1883

Genera
- See text

Tribe of wasps

Mesoleiini is a tribe of parasitic wasps in the subfamily Ctenopelmatinae.

== Genera ==
- Alcochera
- Alexeter
- Anoncus
- Apholium
- Arbelus
- Atithasus
- Azelus
- Barytarbes
- Campodorus
- Dentimachus
- Himerta
- Hyperbatus
- Iskarus
- Lagarotis
- Lamachus
- Leipula
- Mesoleius
- Neostroblia
- Otlophorus
- Perispuda
- Protarchus
- Rhinotorus
- Saotis
- Scopesis
- Semimesoleius
- Smicrolius
