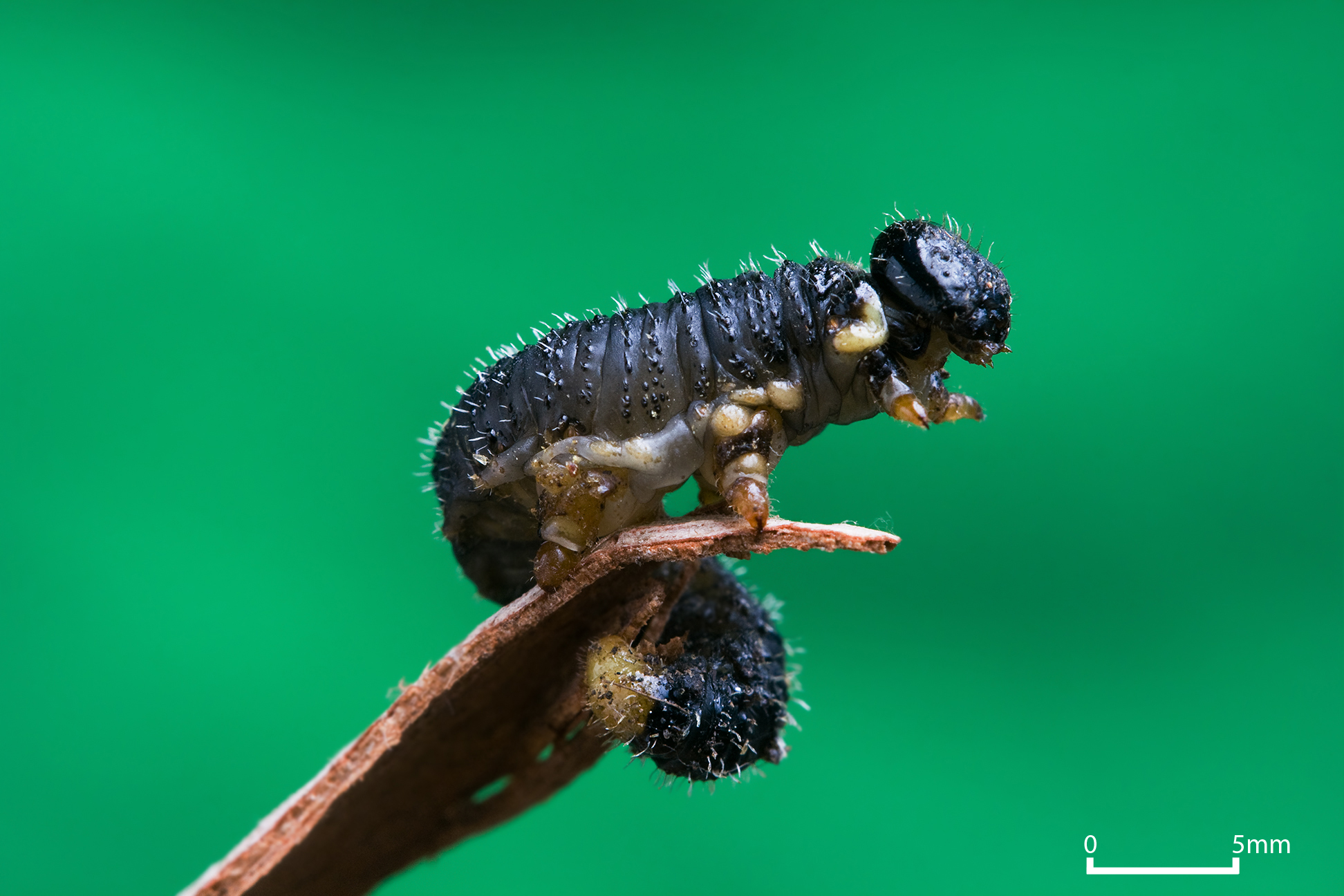
- Perga sp. larva
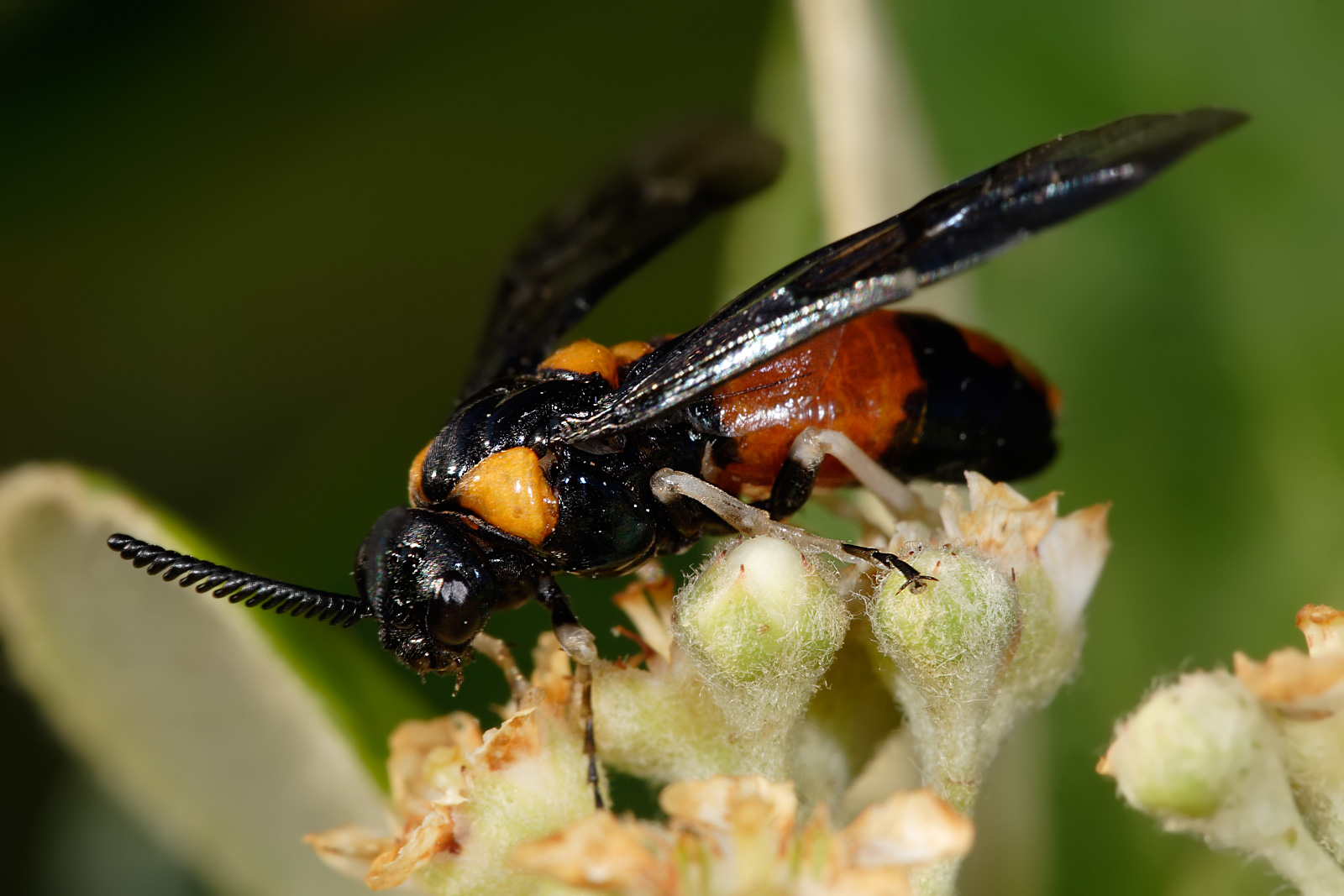
- Melaleuca sawfly, Lophyrotoma zonalis

Scientific classification
- Kingdom: Animalia
- Phylum: Arthropoda
- Class: Insecta
- Order: Hymenoptera
- Suborder: Symphyta
- Superfamily: Tenthredinoidea
- Family: Pergidae

Subfamilies
- See text

= Pergidae =

Family of insects

The Pergidae are a moderate-sized family of sawflies occurring in the Western Hemisphere and the Australasian Region. The Pergidae are, with almost 450 described species, the third-largest family of Symphyta after the Tenthredinidae and the Argidae. Morphologically, most pergids are typically sawfly-like, but the form of the antennae varies considerably in number of segments and from simple to serrate and pectinate or even bipectinate. Sexual dimorphism is common and reflected in differences in type of antennae, colour, and size. Included are some of the few known apterous sawflies, those of the genus Cladomacra occurring in Papua New Guinea and Indonesia, and a species with brachypterous females, Clarissa tasbates, in Tasmania.

== Distribution ==
Most Pergidae species occur in South America and Australia. They are the dominant family in Australia and are one of the major families in the Neotropics. Of the 14 subfamilies, three (Pergulinae, Philomastiginae, and Perreyiinae) occur in both the Australasian and Neotropical regions, but no genera occur in both regions.

In the Australasian Region, Pergidae occur in Australia (including Tasmania) and the islands of New Guinea and New Britain. The most northeastern records are Sulawesi and Indonesia with two species of Cladomacra described from Sulawesi. Only one introduced species (Phylacteophaga froggatti) occurs in New Zealand and New Caledonia, but is not native to those countries. In the Western Hemisphere, they occur from southeastern Canada through the eastern United States south to the southern tip of South America (Magallanes Province, Chile), with their greatest diversity in the Neotropics. Only one genus, Acordulecera, with several species, occurs in Canada and the United States, extending also into the West Indies.

== Biology ==
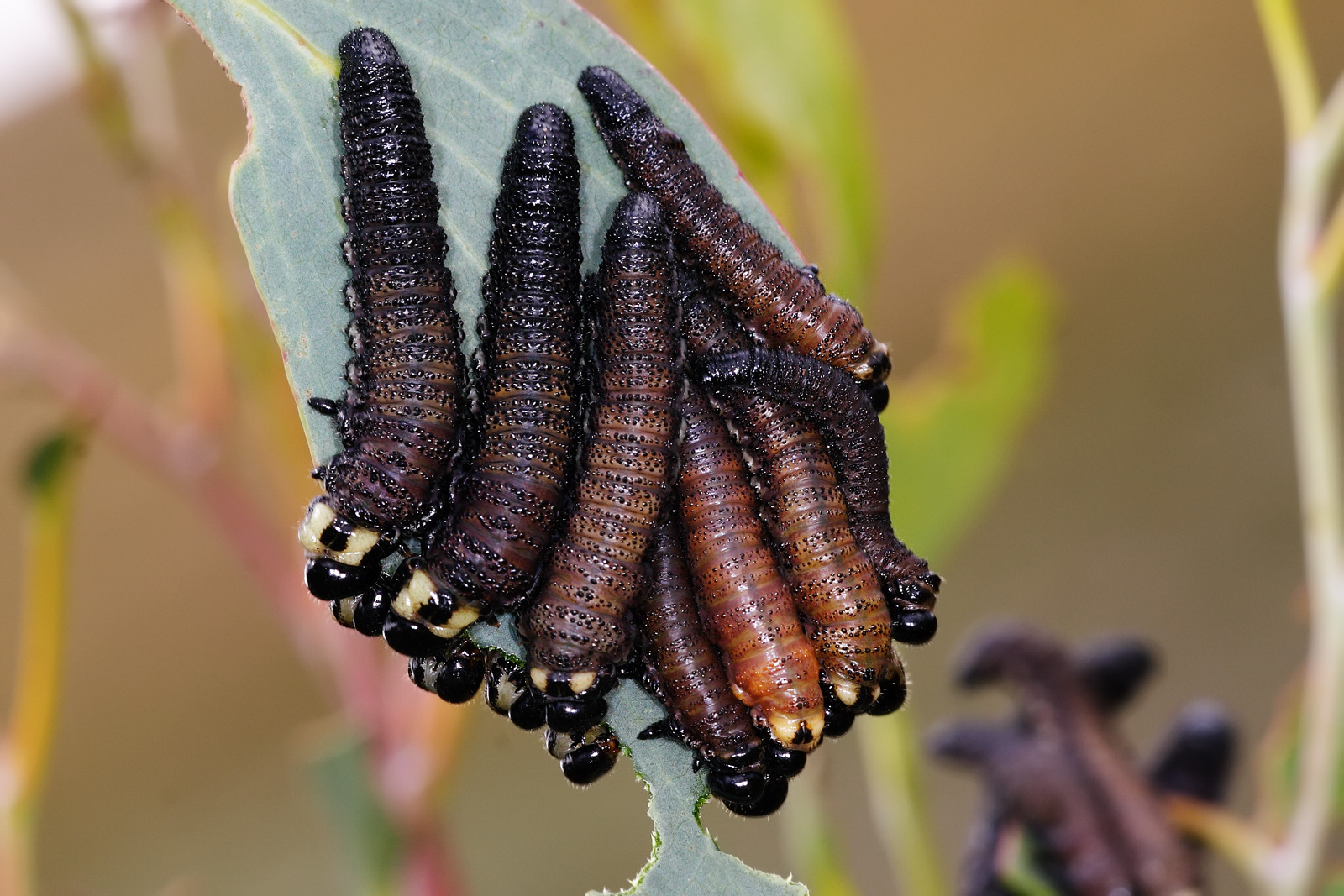
Larvae on Eucalyptus leaf

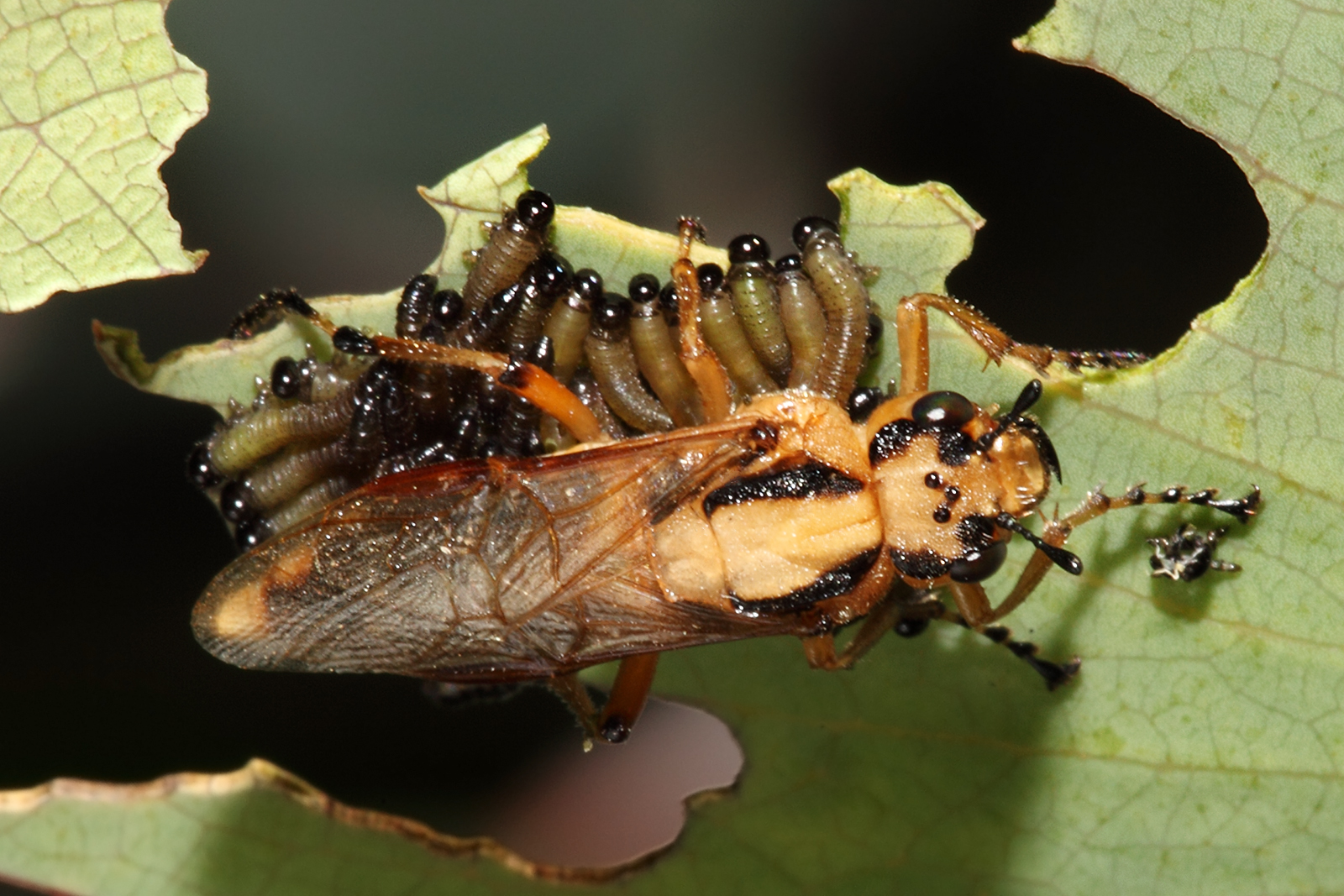
Larvae and protective female parent of Pseudoperga sp. (Perginae)

Biology and food plant data are still lacking for most pergid species. Food plants are extremely diverse and those for the Australasian fauna are much better known than for the Neotropics. Though many of the Australian species feed on various species of Eucalyptus (sensu lato), others have such divergent food plants as dead or dying leaves, aquatic ferns, and fungi. Most are external leaf feeders, though some are shoot borers or leaf miners. Some Euryinae are saprophagous, live on or close to the ground, and are crepuscular or nocturnal. Adult habits are known for few, but maternal care is known in some Australian species of the subfamilies Perginae and Philomastiginae and the South American Syzygoniinae.

== Behavior ==
Larvae of some Perreyia species travel in groups on the ground and eat dead or dying vegetation. They also travel as groups to find group pupation sites. These groups are a tight-knit mass of larvae crawling over each other looking like a giant slug. In the genus Perga, groups come to periodic halts and individuals within the groups begin to raise and lower their abdomens to communicate to the rest of the group to begin moving again.

== Economic importance ==
Some pergids can be economically important because of their defoliation. Species of Tequus feed on potatoes in Peru and Bolivia, Cerospastus volupis defoliates Nothofagus in Chile and Argentina, a large number of species defoliate (Perginae) or mine in the leaves (Phylacteophaginae) of various species of Eucalyptus in Australia. In particular, the leafminers of the genus Phylacteophaga have been of concern in New Zealand and New Caledonia since being introduced into those countries. Other species of Haplostegus, Enjijus, and Sutwanus feed on the foliage or are shoot borers of guava, Psidium spp., in Central and South America, and Acordulecera species defoliate oaks and hickories in the eastern North American deciduous forests. Some species are of concern to agriculture in Australia (Queensland), Brazil, and Uruguay, where larvae are poisonous to livestock if ingested. Two species are of potential value as biological control agents of invasive weeds in the United States. Lophyrotoma zonalis from Australia has been considered for release against Melaleuca quinquenervia in Florida, and Heteroperreyia hubrichi against the Brazilian peppertree, Schinus terebinthifolius.

Livestock, especially cattle and sheep, are known to consume pergids from their daytime resting places on the ground. The resulting poisoning has been known to cause heavy stock losses. Financial losses from pergid poisoning are substantial enough to warrant the elimination or reduction of pergid food trees in areas where such poisonings are common.

== Subfamilies ==
These 14 subfamilies belong to the family Pergidae:

- Acordulecerinae
- Conocoxinae
- Euryinae
- Loboceratinae
- Parasyzygoniinae
- Perginae
- Pergulinae
- Perreyiinae
- Philomastiginae
- Phylacteophaginae
- Pterygophorinae
- Pteryperginae
- Styracotechyinae
- Syzygoniinae
