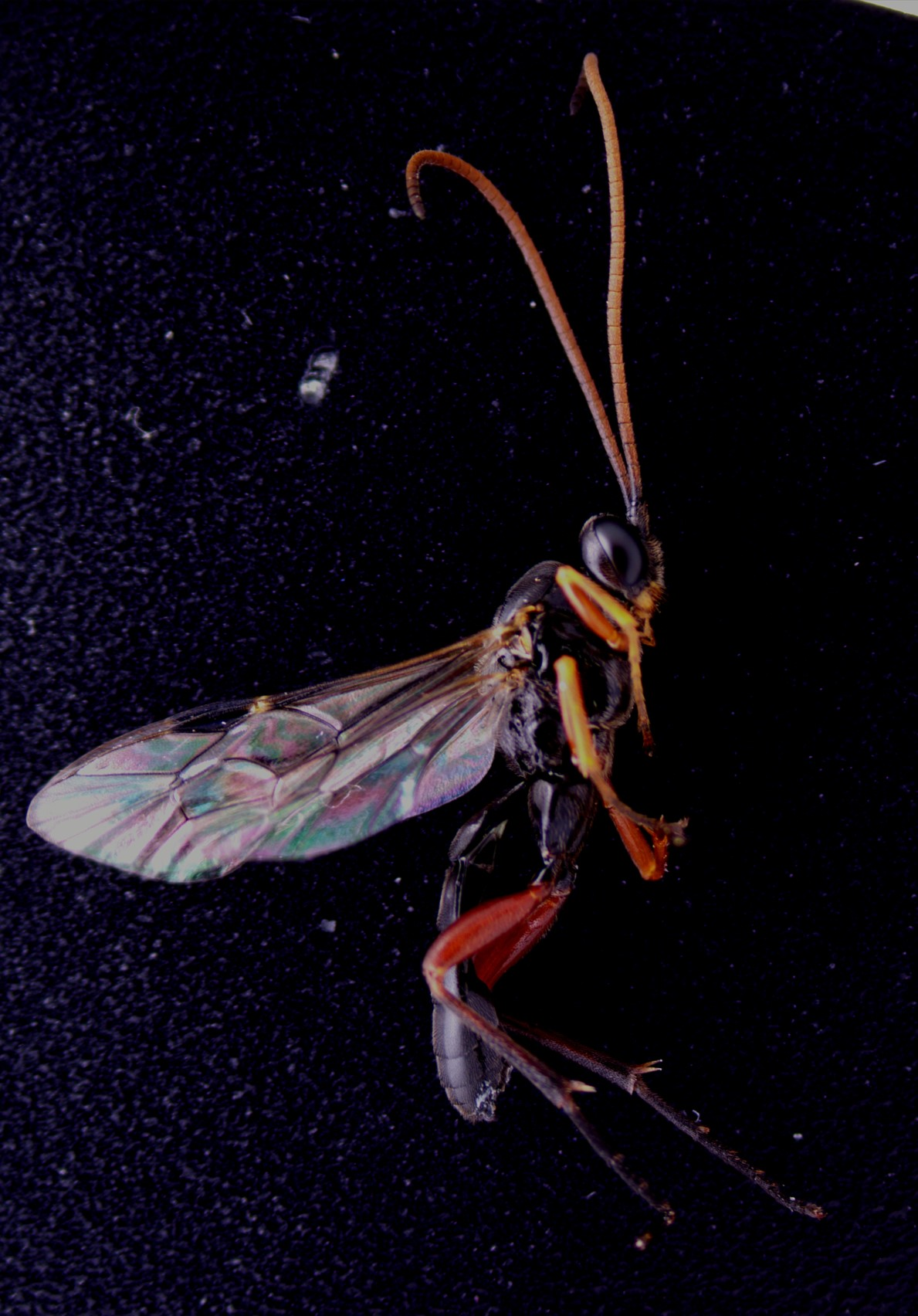
- Xenoschesis fulvicornis

Scientific classification
- Kingdom: Animalia
- Phylum: Arthropoda
- Clade: Pancrustacea
- Class: Insecta
- Order: Hymenoptera
- Family: Ichneumonidae
- Genus: Xenoschesis; Förster, 1869

= Xenoschesis =

Genus of parasitoid wasps

Xenoschesis is a genus of parasitoid wasps belonging to the family Ichneumonidae.

The species of this genus are found in Europe and Northern America.

== Species ==
There are 17 described species:

- Xenoschesis aethiops (Gravenhorst, 1829)
- Xenoschesis cinctiventris (Ashmead, 1896)
- Xenoschesis crassicornis (Uchida, 1928)
- Xenoschesis crassitarsus (Walley, 1935)
- Xenoschesis flavopicta (Strobl, 1903)
- Xenoschesis fulvicornis (Kriechbaumer, 1891)
- Xenoschesis fulvipes (Gravenhorst, 1829)
- Xenoschesis gracilis (Cushman, 1915)
- Xenoschesis inareolata (Sheng & Sun, 2013)
- Xenoschesis incarnator (Aubert, 1985)
- Xenoschesis limata (Cresson, 1864)
- Xenoschesis mordax (Thomson, 1883)
- Xenoschesis nigricoxa (Strobl, 1903)
- Xenoschesis nitida (Walley, 1935)
- Xenoschesis solitaria (Davis, 1897)
- Xenoschesis tianzhuensis (Sheng & Sun, 2013)
- Xenoschesis ustulata (Desvignes, 1856)
