= Mesoleius =

Scientific classification
- Kingdom: Animalia
- Phylum: Arthropoda
- Class: Insecta
- Order: Hymenoptera
- Family: Ichneumonidae
- Tribe: Mesoleiini
- Genus: Mesoleius; Holmgren, 1857

Genus of wasps

Mesoleius is a genus of ichneumon wasps in the family Ichneumonidae. There are at least 160 described species in Mesoleius.

== See also ==
- List of Mesoleius species
