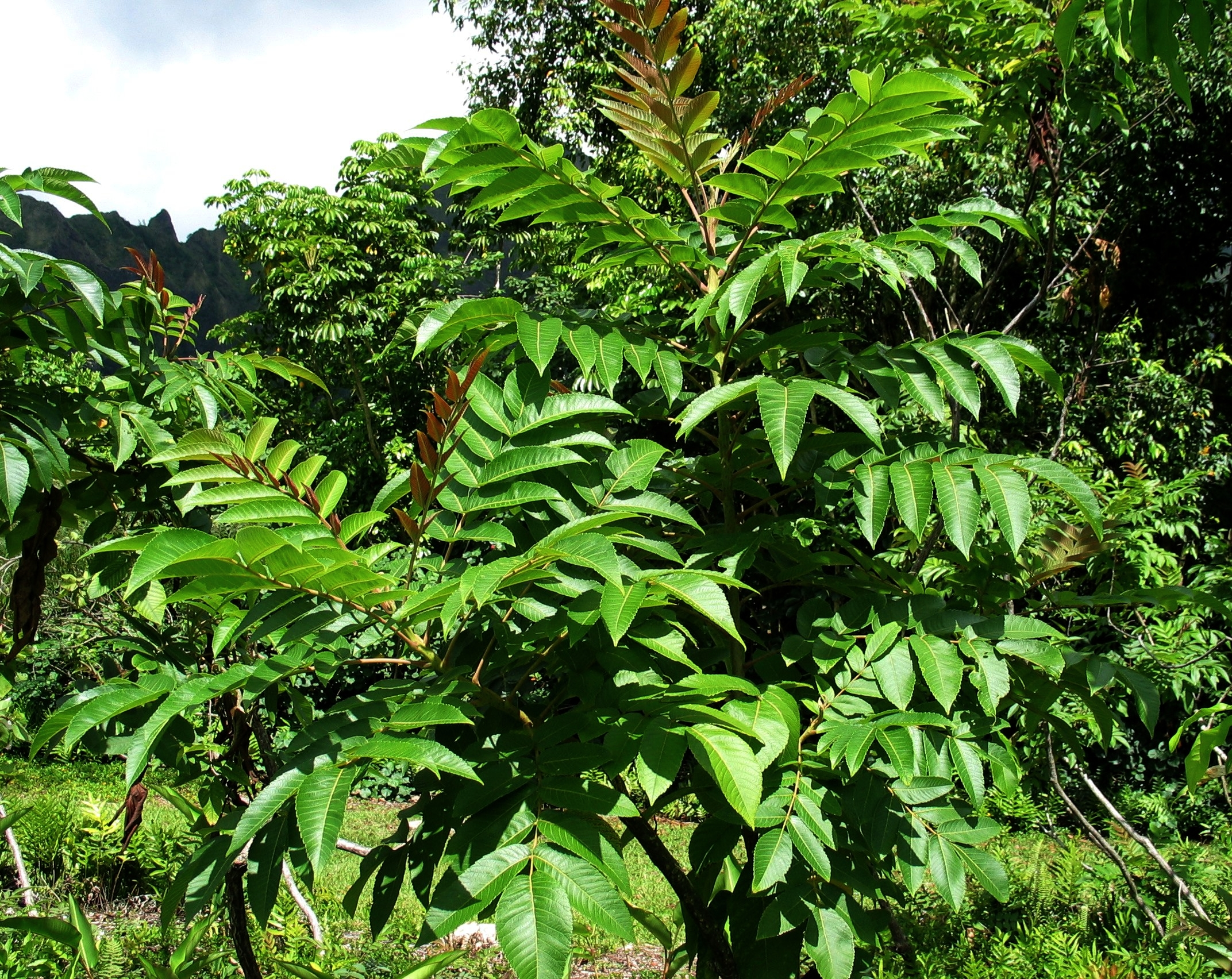

Scientific classification
- Kingdom: Plantae
- Clade: Tracheophytes
- Clade: Angiosperms
- Clade: Eudicots
- Clade: Rosids
- Order: Sapindales
- Family: Anacardiaceae
- Genus: Rhus
- Species: R. sandwicensis

Binomial name
- Rhus sandwicensis A.Gray

Synonyms
- Rhus chinensis var. sandwicensis (A.Gray) Deg. & Greenwell; Rhus semialata var. sandwicensis (A.Gray) Engler

= Rhus sandwicensis =

Species of tree

Rhus sandwicensis, commonly known as neneleau, neleau or Hawaiian sumac, is a species of flowering plant in the cashew family, Anacardiaceae, that is endemic to Hawaii. It is small tree, reaching a height of 4.5–7.5 m (15–25 ft) and a trunk diameter of 10–30 cm (3.9–11.8 in). Neneleau inhabits dry, coastal mesic, mixed mesic and wet forests at elevations of 180–610 m (590–2,000 ft) on all main islands.

The Latin specific epithet of sandwicensis refers to the "Sandwich Islands," as the Hawaiian Islands were once called, and named by James Cook on one of his voyages in the 1770s. James Cook named the islands after John Montagu, 4th Earl of Sandwich for supporting Cook's voyages.

== Uses ==
Neneleau wood was used by Native Hawaiians to make laʻau lomi lomi (massage sticks) and ʻumeke (calabashes).

== Cultural significance ==
Neneleau is mentioned in the Kumulipo, the Hawaiian creation chant.
