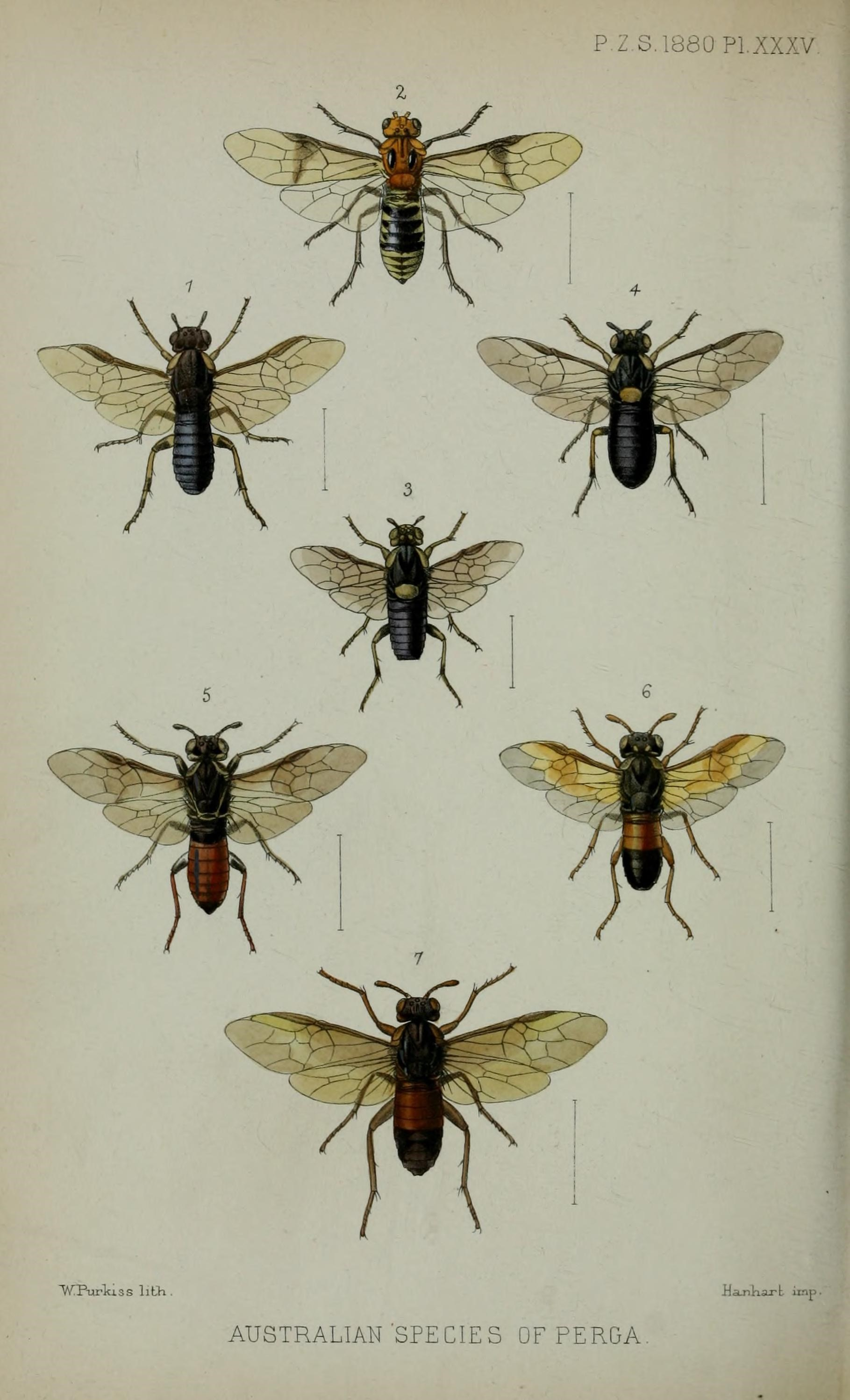

Scientific classification
- Domain: Eukaryota
- Kingdom: Animalia
- Phylum: Arthropoda
- Class: Insecta
- Order: Hymenoptera
- Suborder: Symphyta
- Superfamily: Tenthredinoidea
- Family: Pergidae
- Subfamily: Perginae

= Perginae =

Subfamily of sawflies

Perginae is a subfamily of sawflies in the family Pergidae. There are about 8 genera and more than 60 species in Perginae.

== Genera ==
These eight genera belong to the subfamily Perginae:

- Acanthoperga Shipp, 1894
- Antiperga Benson, 1939
- Cerealces Kirby, 1882
- Paraperga Ashmead, 1898
- Perga Leach, 1817
- Pergagrapta Benson, 1939
- Pseudoperga Guérin-Ménéville, 1844
- Xyloperga Shipp, 1894
