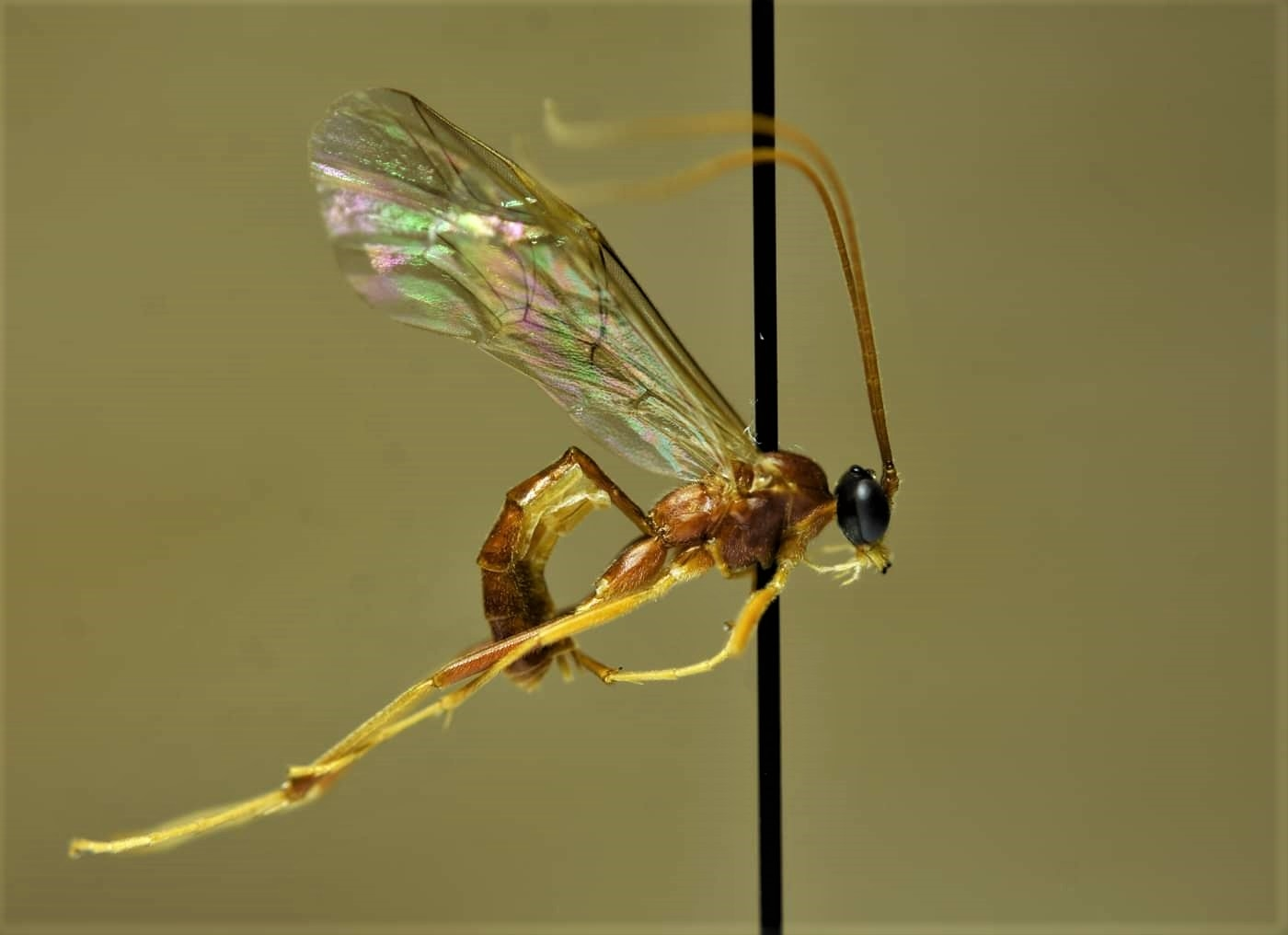
- Alexeter nebulator

Scientific classification
- Kingdom: Animalia
- Phylum: Arthropoda
- Class: Insecta
- Order: Hymenoptera
- Family: Ichneumonidae
- Subfamily: Ctenopelmatinae; Förster, 1869

Tribes
- Ctenopelmatini; Euryproctini; Mesoleiini; Olethrodotini; Perilissini; Pionini; Scolobatini; Seleucini; Westwoodiini

= Ctenopelmatinae =

Subfamily of wasps

Ctenopelmatinae is a cosmopolitan subfamily of ichneumonid parasitoid wasps.

== Description and distribution ==
Ctenopelmatines are small to medium sized ichneumonids. They have a small tooth at the apex of the front tibia and usually do not have a fringe of setae along the clypeus. Ctenopelmatinae was included in the subfamily Tryphoninae in the past. Evidence from larval morphology and ecological traits separate these two groups, but adult specimens can be difficult to differentiate.

Most species are found in temperate climates in the Holarctic region. In the cooler parts of their range, ctenopelmatines can account for over 10% of all ichneumonids.

== Biology ==
Ctenopelmatinae are koinobiont endoparasitoids of Symphyta and, more rarely, Lepidoptera. The host is not killed until after it has spun a cocoon to pupate. There are 95 genera.
