= List of Mesochorus species =

This is a list of 690 species in Mesochorus, a genus of ichneumon wasps in the family Ichneumonidae.

== Mesochorus species ==
- Mesochorus abolitus Brues, 1910^{c g}
- Mesochorus aboriginalis Brues, 1910^{c g}
- Mesochorus abraxator Schwenke, 1989^{c g}
- Mesochorus abruptus Dasch, 1974^{c g}
- Mesochorus absonus Dasch, 1974^{c g}
- Mesochorus aculeatus Dasch, 1974^{c g}
- Mesochorus aculeus Schwenke, 2002^{c g}
- Mesochorus acuminatus Thomson, 1886^{c g}
- Mesochorus acutus Schwenke, 1999^{c g}
- Mesochorus aestivus Dasch, 1974^{c g}
- Mesochorus aggestus Schwenke, 2002^{c g}
- Mesochorus aggressor Fonscolombe, 1852^{c g}
- Mesochorus agilis Cresson, 1865^{c g}
- Mesochorus agnellonis Schwenke, 1999^{c g}
- Mesochorus alajuelicus Dasch, 1974^{c g}
- Mesochorus alaskensis Dasch, 1971^{c g}
- Mesochorus albarascae Schwenke, 1999^{c g}
- Mesochorus albicinctus Dasch, 1974^{c g}
- Mesochorus albifacies Schwenke, 1999^{c g}
- Mesochorus albionis Schwenke, 1999^{c g}
- Mesochorus albolimbatus Schwenke, 1999^{c g}
- Mesochorus alpestris Dasch, 1974^{c g}
- Mesochorus alpigenus Strobl, 1904^{c g}
- Mesochorus alternus Schwenke, 1999^{c g}
- Mesochorus altissimus Dasch, 1974^{c g}
- Mesochorus alveus Schwenke, 1999^{c g}
- Mesochorus amabilis Dasch, 1974^{c g}
- Mesochorus americanus Cresson, 1872^{c g b}
- Mesochorus amnicolaris Schwenke, 1999^{c g}
- Mesochorus amoenus Dasch, 1974^{c g}
- Mesochorus anglicus Schwenke, 1999^{c g}
- Mesochorus angularis Dasch, 1974^{c g}
- Mesochorus angustatus Thomson, 1886^{c g}
- Mesochorus angustistigmatus Dasch, 1974^{c g}
- Mesochorus anhalthinus Schwenke, 2002^{c g}
- Mesochorus annulatus Dasch, 1974^{c g}
- Mesochorus anomalus Holmgren, 1860^{c g}
- Mesochorus antefurcalis Constantineanu & Voicu, 1975^{c g}
- Mesochorus anthracinus Kriechbaumer, 1890^{c g}
- Mesochorus antilliensis Dasch, 1974^{c g}
- Mesochorus apantelis Dasch, 1971^{c g}
- Mesochorus applanatus Dasch, 1971^{c g}
- Mesochorus aquilonis Schwenke, 1999^{c g}
- Mesochorus aquilus Dasch, 1974^{c g}
- Mesochorus aquoreus Dasch, 1974^{c g}
- Mesochorus aranealis Schwenke, 1999^{c g}
- Mesochorus aranearum Ratzeburg, 1852^{c g}
- Mesochorus araucoensis Dasch, 1974^{c g}
- Mesochorus arcticus Dasch, 1971^{c g}
- Mesochorus arduus Schwenke, 1999^{c g}
- Mesochorus arenarius (Haliday, 1838)^{c g}
- Mesochorus areolaris Ratzeburg, 1852^{c g}
- Mesochorus areolatus Provancher, 1883^{c}
- Mesochorus argentinicus Dasch, 1974^{c g}
- Mesochorus argus Schwenke, 1999^{c g}
- Mesochorus argutus Dasch, 1974^{c g}
- Mesochorus arietinus Schwenke, 1999^{c g}
- Mesochorus artus Schwenke, 1999^{c g}
- Mesochorus asperifrons Dasch, 1971^{c g}
- Mesochorus asymmetricus Dasch, 1974^{c g}
- Mesochorus ater Ratzeburg, 1848^{c g}
- Mesochorus atratus Dasch, 1974^{c g}
- Mesochorus atricoxalis Kusigemati, 1985^{c g}
- Mesochorus atriventris Cresson, 1872^{c g}
- Mesochorus attenuatus Dasch, 1974^{c g}
- Mesochorus aulacis Dasch, 1974^{c g}
- Mesochorus aurantiacus Dasch, 1974^{c g}
- Mesochorus aureus Dasch, 1974^{c g}
- Mesochorus bahiae Dasch, 1974^{c g}
- Mesochorus balteatus Dasch, 1971^{c g}
- Mesochorus basalis Curtis, 1833^{c g}
- Mesochorus basilewskyi Benoit, 1955^{c g}
- Mesochorus bavaricus Schwenke, 1999^{c g}
- Mesochorus bellus Dasch, 1971^{c g}
- Mesochorus betuletus Schwenke, 1999^{c g}
- Mesochorus bicinctus Schwenke, 1999^{c g}
- Mesochorus bicolor Schwenke, 1999^{c g}
- Mesochorus bipartitus Schwenke, 1999^{c g}
- Mesochorus bituberculatus Dasch, 1974^{c g}
- Mesochorus blanditus Dasch, 1974^{c g}
- Mesochorus bocainensis Dasch, 1974^{c g}
- Mesochorus boliviensis Dasch, 1974^{c g}
- Mesochorus boreomontanus Schwenke, 1999^{c g}
- Mesochorus boreus Schwenke, 1999^{c g}
- Mesochorus bracatus Schwenke, 1999^{c g}
- Mesochorus brasiliensis Dasch, 1974^{c g}
- Mesochorus brevipetiolatus Ratzeburg, 1844^{c g}
- Mesochorus britannicus Schwenke, 1999^{c g}
- Mesochorus broccus Dasch, 1974^{c g}
- Mesochorus brullei Dasch, 1974^{c g}
- Mesochorus bucculentus Dasch, 1971^{c g}
- Mesochorus bulbosus Dasch, 1974^{c g}
- Mesochorus bulgaricus Schwenke, 1999^{c g}
- Mesochorus bullatus (Dasch, 1974)^{c g}
- Mesochorus caccabatus Dasch, 1974^{c g}
- Mesochorus cacuminis Schwenke, 1999^{c g}
- Mesochorus calais Viereck, 1917^{c g}
- Mesochorus calidus Schwenke, 1999^{c g}
- Mesochorus caligator Schwenke, 1999^{c g}
- Mesochorus callidus Dasch, 1974^{c g}
- Mesochorus callis Schwenke, 1999^{c g}
- Mesochorus campestris Schwenke, 1999^{c g}
- Mesochorus canalis Schwenke, 1999^{c g}
- Mesochorus canaveseus Schwenke, 1999^{c g}
- Mesochorus capeki Schwenke, 2002^{c g}
- Mesochorus carceratus Brues, 1910^{c g}
- Mesochorus carinatus Schwenke, 1999^{c g}
- Mesochorus carinifrons Dasch, 1974^{c g}
- Mesochorus carintiacus Schwenke, 2004^{c g}
- Mesochorus carolinensis Dasch, 1971^{c g}
- Mesochorus castaneus Uchida, 1933^{c g}
- Mesochorus castellanus Schwenke, 1999^{c g}
- Mesochorus cataclysmi Brues, 1910^{c g}
- Mesochorus cestus Dasch, 1974^{c g}
- Mesochorus chasseralis Schwenke, 1999^{c g}
- Mesochorus chilensis Dasch, 1974^{c g}
- Mesochorus cholulaensis Dasch, 1974^{c g}
- Mesochorus chrysurus Dasch, 1974^{c g}
- Mesochorus cimbicis Ratzeburg, 1844^{c g}
- Mesochorus cinctus Schwenke, 1999^{c g}
- Mesochorus cingulatus Dasch, 1974^{c g}
- Mesochorus circinus Dasch, 1974^{c g}
- Mesochorus claristigmaticus Morley, 1913^{c g}
- Mesochorus clarus Schwenke, 1999^{c g}
- Mesochorus clinatus Dasch, 1974^{c g}
- Mesochorus coartatus Schwenke, 2002^{c g}
- Mesochorus cognatus Schwenke, 1999^{c g}
- Mesochorus columbiae Dasch, 1974^{c g}
- Mesochorus columbinus Schwenke, 1999^{c g}
- Mesochorus compressus Dasch, 1974^{c g}
- Mesochorus comptus Dasch, 1974^{c g}
- Mesochorus concavus Dasch, 1974^{c g}
- Mesochorus concolor Szepligeti, 1914^{c g}
- Mesochorus conicus Dasch, 1974^{c g}
- Mesochorus conjunctus Dasch, 1974^{c g}
- Mesochorus conspicuus Schwenke, 2002^{c g}
- Mesochorus constrictus Schwenke, 2002^{c g}
- Mesochorus contractus Ratzeburg, 1848^{c g}
- Mesochorus convallis Schwenke, 2002^{c g}
- Mesochorus convexus Dasch, 1974^{c g}
- Mesochorus coreensis Lee & Suh, 1991^{c g}
- Mesochorus coronatus Dasch, 1971^{c g}
- Mesochorus costaricensis Dasch, 1974^{c g}
- Mesochorus cracentis Dasch, 1974^{c g}
- Mesochorus crassimanus Holmgren, 1860^{c g}
- Mesochorus cristatus Dasch, 1974^{c g}
- Mesochorus cubensis Dasch, 1974^{c g}
- Mesochorus culmosus Dasch, 1974^{c g}
- Mesochorus cupreatus Dasch, 1971^{c g}
- Mesochorus curvicauda Thomson, 1886^{c}
- Mesochorus curvulus Thomson, 1886^{c g}
- Mesochorus cuspidatus Lee & Suh, 1993^{c}
- Mesochorus cuzcoensis Dasch, 1974^{c g}
- Mesochorus cyparissiae Schwenke, 2002^{c g}
- Mesochorus daedalus Dasch, 1974^{c g}
- Mesochorus debilis Dasch, 1974^{c g}
- Mesochorus deceptus Dasch, 1974^{c g}
- Mesochorus declinans Habermehl, 1922^{c g}
- Mesochorus decoratus Wilkinson, 1927^{c g}
- Mesochorus deficiens Dasch, 1974^{c g}
- Mesochorus deletus Dasch, 1971^{c g}
- Mesochorus dentatus Dasch, 1971^{c g}
- Mesochorus dentus Kusigemati, 1985^{c g}
- Mesochorus depressus (Dasch, 1974)^{c g}
- Mesochorus desertorum Dasch, 1974^{c g}
- Mesochorus dessauensis Schwenke, 1999^{c g}
- Mesochorus dilatus Dasch, 1974^{c g}
- Mesochorus dilleri Schwenke, 1999^{c g}
- Mesochorus dilobatus Schwenke, 1999^{c g}
- Mesochorus dilutus Ratzeburg, 1844^{c g}
- Mesochorus diluvius Schwenke, 1999^{c g}
- Mesochorus dimidiator Aubert, 1970^{c g}
- Mesochorus dimidiatus Holmgren, 1860^{c g}
- Mesochorus discitergus (Say, 1835)^{c g b}
- Mesochorus discolor Schwenke, 1999^{c g}
- Mesochorus dispar Brischke, 1880^{c g}
- Mesochorus dissimilis Dasch, 1974^{c g}
- Mesochorus dissitus Dasch, 1974^{c g}
- Mesochorus distentus Dasch, 1971^{c g}
- Mesochorus divaricatus Dasch, 1971^{c g}
- Mesochorus divergentus Schwenke, 2002^{c g}
- Mesochorus diversus Dasch, 1974^{c g}
- Mesochorus doleri Schwenke, 1999^{c g}
- Mesochorus dolorosus Marshall, 1877^{c g}
- Mesochorus dolosus Dasch, 1974^{c g}
- Mesochorus dormitorius Brues, 1910^{c g}
- Mesochorus doryssus Dasch, 1974^{c g}
- Mesochorus dreisbachi Dasch, 1971^{c g}
- Mesochorus dumosus Schwenke, 1999^{c g}
- Mesochorus ebenus Dasch, 1974^{c g}
- Mesochorus ecuadorensis Dasch, 1974^{c g}
- Mesochorus eichhorni Schwenke, 1999^{c g}
- Mesochorus ejuncidus Dasch, 1971^{c g}
- Mesochorus elegans Dasch, 1974^{c g}
- Mesochorus elongatus Dasch, 1971^{c g}
- Mesochorus emaciatus Dasch, 1974^{c g}
- Mesochorus ensifer Dasch, 1974^{c g}
- Mesochorus errabundus Hartig, 1838^{c g}
- Mesochorus eruditus Dasch, 1974^{c g}
- Mesochorus erythraeus Dasch, 1971^{c g}
- Mesochorus eusubtilis Schwenke, 2002^{c g}
- Mesochorus eximius Dasch, 1974^{c g}
- Mesochorus expansus Dasch, 1974^{c g}
- Mesochorus exquisitus Schwenke, 1999^{c g}
- Mesochorus exsertus Dasch, 1971^{c g}
- Mesochorus extensator Schwenke, 2002^{c g}
- Mesochorus extensus Dasch, 1974^{c g}
- Mesochorus extraordinarius Schwenke, 1999^{c g}
- Mesochorus extremus Dasch, 1974^{c g}
- Mesochorus facetus Dasch, 1974^{c g}
- Mesochorus faciator Horstmann, 2003^{c g}
- Mesochorus falcatus Dasch, 1974^{c g}
- Mesochorus fallax Dasch, 1974^{c g}
- Mesochorus fastigatus Dasch, 1974^{c g}
- Mesochorus fastuosus Dasch, 1974^{c g}
- Mesochorus femoralis Brischke, 1880^{c g}
- Mesochorus fennicus Schwenke, 1999^{c g}
- Mesochorus ferrugineus Dasch, 1974^{c g}
- Mesochorus filicornis Dasch, 1974^{c g}
- Mesochorus flaemingus Schwenke, 1999^{c g}
- Mesochorus flammeus Dasch, 1974^{c g}
- Mesochorus flavidus Dasch, 1971^{c g}
- Mesochorus flavimaculatus Dasch, 1974^{c g}
- Mesochorus flexus Schwenke, 1999^{c g}
- Mesochorus fluvialis Schwenke, 2002^{c g}
- Mesochorus foersteri Dasch, 1971^{c g}
- Mesochorus fragilis Morley, 1913^{c g}
- Mesochorus fraterculus Schwenke, 1999^{c g}
- Mesochorus fraudulentus Dasch, 1974^{c g}
- Mesochorus frigidus Schwenke, 1999^{c g}
- Mesochorus frondosus Schwenke, 1999^{c g}
- Mesochorus fulgurans Curtis, 1833^{c g}
- Mesochorus fulgurator Horstmann, 2006^{c g}
- Mesochorus fuliginatus Dasch, 1971^{c g}
- Mesochorus fulvipes Schwenke, 1999^{c g}
- Mesochorus funestus Dasch, 1974^{c g}
- Mesochorus furvus Dasch, 1974^{c g}
- Mesochorus fuscicornis Brischke, 1880^{c g}
- Mesochorus fuscus Schwenke, 1999^{c g}
- Mesochorus gallicator Aubert, 1963^{c g}
- Mesochorus gardanus Schwenke, 1999^{c g}
- Mesochorus gelidus Dasch, 1971^{c g}
- Mesochorus gemellus Holmgren, 1860^{c g}
- Mesochorus gemmatus Dasch, 1971^{c g}
- Mesochorus georgievi Schwenke, 2004^{c g}
- Mesochorus giaglioneus Schwenke, 1999^{c g}
- Mesochorus gibbosus Schwenke, 1999^{c g}
- Mesochorus giberius (Thunberg, 1822)^{c g b}
- Mesochorus gilvus Schwenke, 1999^{c g}
- Mesochorus gladiator Schwenke, 1999^{c g}
- Mesochorus gladiatus Dasch, 1974^{c g}
- Mesochorus glaucus Dasch, 1974^{c g}
- Mesochorus globulator (Thunberg, 1822)^{c g}
- Mesochorus gracilentus Brischke, 1880^{c g}
- Mesochorus gracilis Brischke, 1880^{c g}
- Mesochorus grandidentatus Dasch, 1974^{c g}
- Mesochorus grandisops Dasch, 1971^{c g}
- Mesochorus gravis Schwenke, 1999^{c g}
- Mesochorus grenadensis Ashmead, 1900^{c g}
- Mesochorus haeselbarthi Schwenke, 1999^{c g}
- Mesochorus halticae Schwenke, 1999^{c g}
- Mesochorus hamatus Townes, 1945^{c g}
- Mesochorus hashimotoi Kusigemati, 1985^{c g}
- Mesochorus hastatus Dasch, 1974^{c g}
- Mesochorus hebraicator Aubert, 1970^{c g}
- Mesochorus herero Enderlein, 1914^{c g}
- Mesochorus hesperus Dasch, 1971^{c g}
- Mesochorus heterodon Horstmann, 2006^{c g}
- Mesochorus hidalgoensis Dasch, 1974^{c g}
- Mesochorus hilaris Dasch, 1974^{c g}
- Mesochorus hirticoleus Dasch, 1971^{c g}
- Mesochorus hispidus Dasch, 1974^{c g}
- Mesochorus hollandicus Schwenke, 2004^{c g}
- Mesochorus holmgreni Dasch, 1971^{c g}
- Mesochorus horcomollensis Dasch, 1974^{c g}
- Mesochorus horstmanni Schwenke, 1999^{c g}
- Mesochorus hortensis Schwenke, 1999^{c g}
- Mesochorus hyalinus Dasch, 1974^{c g}
- Mesochorus ibericus Schwenke, 1999^{c g}
- Mesochorus iburganus Schwenke, 1999^{c g}
- Mesochorus ichneutese Uchida, 1955^{c g}
- Mesochorus ignotus Dasch, 1974^{c g}
- Mesochorus illustris Schwenke, 1999^{c g}
- Mesochorus imitatus Dasch, 1971^{c g}
- Mesochorus impiger Tosquinet, 1903^{c g}
- Mesochorus impolitus Dasch, 1974^{c g}
- Mesochorus impunctatus Dasch, 1974^{c g}
- Mesochorus inaequalis Dasch, 1974^{c g}
- Mesochorus inaequidens Dasch, 1971^{c g}
- Mesochorus incae Dasch, 1974^{c g}
- Mesochorus incisus Dasch, 1974^{c g}
- Mesochorus inclusus Schwenke, 2002^{c g}
- Mesochorus incomptus Dasch, 1974^{c g}
- Mesochorus incultus Dasch, 1971^{c g}
- Mesochorus indagator Dasch, 1974^{c g}
- Mesochorus infacetus Dasch, 1974^{c g}
- Mesochorus infensus Dasch, 1974^{c g}
- Mesochorus inflatus Dasch, 1971^{c g}
- Mesochorus infractus Dasch, 1974^{c g}
- Mesochorus infuscatus Dasch, 1971^{c g}
- Mesochorus ingentis Schwenke, 1999^{c g}
- Mesochorus inimicus Dasch, 1974^{c g}
- Mesochorus iniquus Schwenke, 1999^{c g}
- Mesochorus inobseptus Dasch, 1971^{c g}
- Mesochorus insignatus Dasch, 1974^{c g}
- Mesochorus insolitus Dasch, 1974^{c g}
- Mesochorus instriatus Kusigemati, 1985^{c g}
- Mesochorus insularis Schwenke, 1999^{c g}
- Mesochorus integer Dasch, 1974^{c g}
- Mesochorus intermissus Schwenke, 1999^{c g}
- Mesochorus interruptus Kusigemati, 1988^{c g}
- Mesochorus interstitialis Kusigemati, 1985^{c g}
- Mesochorus intonsus Dasch, 1971^{c g}
- Mesochorus inurbanus Dasch, 1974^{c g}
- Mesochorus inversus Schwenke, 1999^{c g}
- Mesochorus iridescens Cresson, 1879^{c g}
- Mesochorus iugosus Schwenke, 2002^{c g}
- Mesochorus jacobus Schwenke, 1999^{c g}
- Mesochorus jamaicae Dasch, 1974^{c g}
- Mesochorus japonicus Kusigemati, 1985^{c g}
- Mesochorus jenensis Schwenke, 2002^{c g}
- Mesochorus jenniferae Schwenke, 2002^{c g}
- Mesochorus jihyetanus Kusigemati, 1985^{c g}
- Mesochorus jucundus Provancher, 1883^{c g}
- Mesochorus jugicola Strobl, 1904^{c g}
- Mesochorus junctus Dasch, 1974^{c g}
- Mesochorus juranus Schwenke, 1999^{c g}
- Mesochorus kamouraskae Dasch, 1971^{c g}
- Mesochorus kansensis Dasch, 1971^{c g}
- Mesochorus kentuckiensis Dasch, 1971^{c g}
- Mesochorus kirunae Schwenke, 1999^{c g}
- Mesochorus kumatai Kusigemati, 1988^{c g}
- Mesochorus kumganensis Lee & Suh, 1993^{c g}
- Mesochorus kuwayamae Matsumura, 1926^{c g}
- Mesochorus laboriosus Dasch, 1974^{c g}
- Mesochorus lacassus Schwenke, 1999^{c g}
- Mesochorus lacus Schwenke, 1999^{c g}
- Mesochorus laevigatus Dasch, 1974^{c g}
- Mesochorus lanceolatus Schwenke, 1999^{c g}
- Mesochorus lapideus Brues, 1910^{c g}
- Mesochorus lapponicus Thomson, 1885^{c g}
- Mesochorus larentiae Schwenke, 1999^{c g}
- Mesochorus laricis Hartig, 1838^{c g}
- Mesochorus lateralis Dasch, 1974^{c g}
- Mesochorus latus Schwenke, 1999^{c g}
- Mesochorus lautus Dasch, 1974^{c g}
- Mesochorus leviculus Dasch, 1974^{c g}
- Mesochorus lilioceriphilus Schwenke, 2000^{c g}
- Mesochorus limae Dasch, 1974^{c g}
- Mesochorus limbatus Dasch, 1974^{c g}
- Mesochorus liquidus Schwenke, 2002^{c g}
- Mesochorus lituratus Dasch, 1974^{c g}
- Mesochorus lobaticola Benoit, 1955^{c g}
- Mesochorus lobatus Dasch, 1974^{c g}
- Mesochorus longicoleus Dasch, 1974^{c g}
- Mesochorus longidens Dasch, 1974^{c g}
- Mesochorus longidentatus Dasch, 1974^{c g}
- Mesochorus longiscutatus Dasch, 1971^{c g}
- Mesochorus longistigma Schwenke, 2002^{c g}
- Mesochorus longurius Schwenke, 1999^{c g}
- Mesochorus luminis Schwenke, 1999^{c g}
- Mesochorus lunarius Schwenke, 1999^{c g}
- Mesochorus luridipes Schwenke, 1999^{c g}
- Mesochorus luteipes Cresson, 1872^{c g}
- Mesochorus luteocinctus Dasch, 1974^{c g}
- Mesochorus luteolus Dasch, 1974^{c g}
- Mesochorus lydae Ratzeburg, 1848^{c g}
- Mesochorus macilentus Dasch, 1974^{c g}
- Mesochorus macrophyae Schwenke, 1999^{c g}
- Mesochorus maculatus Dasch, 1974^{c g}
- Mesochorus maculitibia Costa Lima, 1950^{c g}
- Mesochorus magnicrus Dasch, 1974^{c g}
- Mesochorus magnus Dasch, 1974^{c g}
- Mesochorus malaiseus Schwenke, 1999^{c g}
- Mesochorus maleficus Dasch, 1971^{c g}
- Mesochorus mandibularis Lee & Suh, 1991^{c g}
- Mesochorus marcapatae Dasch, 1974^{c g}
- Mesochorus martinus Schwenke, 1999^{c g}
- Mesochorus marylandicus Dasch, 1971^{c g}
- Mesochorus masoni Dasch, 1971^{c g}
- Mesochorus matucanae Dasch, 1974^{c g}
- Mesochorus maurus Dasch, 1974^{c g}
- Mesochorus maximus Schwenke, 1999^{c g}
- Mesochorus medius Dasch, 1974^{c g}
- Mesochorus melalophacharopse Kusigemati, 1985^{c g}
- Mesochorus melanothorax Wilkinson, 1927^{c g}
- Mesochorus melinus Dasch, 1974^{c g}
- Mesochorus melleus Cresson, 1872^{c g}
- Mesochorus mellis Schwenke, 1999^{c g}
- Mesochorus mellumiensis Schwenke, 1999^{c g}
- Mesochorus meridionator Aubert, 1966^{c g}
- Mesochorus messaureus Schwenke, 1999^{c g}
- Mesochorus microbathros Kusigemati, 1985^{c g}
- Mesochorus miniatus Dasch, 1974^{c g}
- Mesochorus minowai Uchida, 1929^{c g}
- Mesochorus minutulus Schwenke, 1999^{c g}
- Mesochorus mirabilis Schwenke, 1999^{c g}
- Mesochorus mirandae Dasch, 1974^{c g}
- Mesochorus moabae Dasch, 1971^{c g}
- Mesochorus modestus Dasch, 1974^{c g}
- Mesochorus molestus Dasch, 1974^{c g}
- Mesochorus monacensis Schwenke, 1999^{c g}
- Mesochorus monomaculatus Kusigemati, 1985^{c g}
- Mesochorus montanus Dasch, 1974^{c g}
- Mesochorus montis Schwenke, 1999^{c g}
- Mesochorus morenator Schwenke, 1999^{c g}
- Mesochorus moskwanus Schwenke, 1999^{c g}
- Mesochorus mucronatus Dasch, 1974^{c g}
- Mesochorus mulleolus Dasch, 1974^{c g}
- Mesochorus mulleri Schwenke, 1999^{c g}
- Mesochorus multilineatus Dasch, 1974^{c g}
- Mesochorus multipunctatus Dasch, 1974^{c g}
- Mesochorus muscosus Dasch, 1974^{c g}
- Mesochorus myrtilli Schwenke, 1999^{c g}
- Mesochorus naknekensis Dasch, 1971^{c g}
- Mesochorus naturnsis Schwenke, 2002^{c g}
- Mesochorus necatorius Dasch, 1974^{c g}
- Mesochorus neglectus Dasch, 1974^{c g}
- Mesochorus nematus Schwenke, 2004^{c g}
- Mesochorus nemus Schwenke, 2002^{c g}
- Mesochorus nepalensis Kusigemati, 1988^{c g}
- Mesochorus neuquenensis Dasch, 1974^{c g}
- Mesochorus nichelinus Schwenke, 2002^{c g}
- Mesochorus niger (Dasch, 1974)^{c g}
- Mesochorus nigrifemoratus Dasch, 1974^{c g}
- Mesochorus nigrithorax Kiss, 1926^{c g}
- Mesochorus nigritulus Dasch, 1974^{c g}
- Mesochorus nikolauseus Schwenke, 2004^{c g}
- Mesochorus nitidus Schwenke, 1999^{c g}
- Mesochorus nkulius Benoit, 1955^{c g}
- Mesochorus noctivagus Viereck, 1905^{c g}
- Mesochorus norrbyneus Schwenke, 1999^{c g}
- Mesochorus notialis Dasch, 1974^{c g}
- Mesochorus novateutoniae Dasch, 1974^{c g}
- Mesochorus nox Morley, 1926^{c g}
- Mesochorus noxiosus Dasch, 1974^{c g}
- Mesochorus nuncupator (Panzer, 1800)^{c g}
- Mesochorus oaxacae Dasch, 1974^{c g}
- Mesochorus obliterator Aubert, 1965^{c g}
- Mesochorus obliteratus Dasch, 1971^{c g}
- Mesochorus oblitus Dasch, 1974^{c g}
- Mesochorus obscurus Dasch, 1974^{c g}
- Mesochorus obsoletus Dasch, 1971^{c g}
- Mesochorus olerum Curtis, 1833^{c g}
- Mesochorus olitorius Schwenke, 1999^{c g}
- Mesochorus ontariensis Dasch, 1971^{c g}
- Mesochorus opacus Schwenke, 1999^{c g}
- Mesochorus oppacheus Schwenke, 1999^{c g}
- Mesochorus oranjeanus Schwenke, 2004^{c g}
- Mesochorus orbis Schwenke, 1999^{c g}
- Mesochorus orbitalis Holmgren, 1860^{c g}
- Mesochorus orestes Dasch, 1974^{c g}
- Mesochorus orientalis (Viereck, 1912)^{c g}
- Mesochorus ornatus Wilkinson, 1927^{c g}
- Mesochorus oshobotrianus Schwenke, 2002^{c g}
- Mesochorus ottawaensis (Harrington, 1892)^{c g}
- Mesochorus ovimaculatus Schwenke, 1999^{c g}
- Mesochorus owenae Schwenke, 1999^{c g}
- Mesochorus oxfordensis Schwenke, 1999^{c g}
- Mesochorus palanderi Holmgren, 1869^{c g}
- Mesochorus palinensis Dasch, 1974^{c g}
- Mesochorus palliolatus Dasch, 1974^{c g}
- Mesochorus pallipes Brischke, 1880^{c g}
- Mesochorus palmaricus Dasch, 1974^{c g}
- Mesochorus palus Schwenke, 1999^{c g}
- Mesochorus panamensis Dasch, 1974^{c g}
- Mesochorus paraensis Dasch, 1974^{c g}
- Mesochorus parallelus Dasch, 1971^{c g}
- Mesochorus parilis Kusigemati, 1988^{c g}
- Mesochorus parvioculatus Schwenke, 1999^{c g}
- Mesochorus parvus Dasch, 1971^{c g}
- Mesochorus pascuus Schwenke, 1999^{c g}
- Mesochorus paulus Dasch, 1971^{c g}
- Mesochorus pectinatus Szepligeti, 1901^{c g}
- Mesochorus pectinellus Horstmann, 2006^{c g}
- Mesochorus pectinipes Bridgman, 1883^{c g}
- Mesochorus pektusanus Lee & Suh, 1993^{c g}
- Mesochorus peltatus Dasch, 1971^{c g}
- Mesochorus pelvis Schwenke, 2002^{c g}
- Mesochorus pentagonalis Dasch, 1974^{c g}
- Mesochorus peremptor Dasch, 1974^{c g}
- Mesochorus perforatus Schwenke, 2002^{c g}
- Mesochorus perniciosus Viereck, 1911^{c g}
- Mesochorus personatus Dasch, 1971^{c g}
- Mesochorus perticatus Schwenke, 1999^{c g}
- Mesochorus perugianus Schwenke, 1999^{c g}
- Mesochorus peruvianus Dasch, 1974^{c g}
- Mesochorus petilus Dasch, 1974^{c g}
- Mesochorus petiolaris Brischke, 1880^{c g}
- Mesochorus petiolus Schwenke, 2002^{c g}
- Mesochorus pharaonis Schwenke, 1999^{c g}
- Mesochorus philippinensis Ashmead, 1904^{c g}
- Mesochorus phyllodectae Schwenke, 1999^{c g}
- Mesochorus piceanus Schwenke, 1999^{c g}
- Mesochorus piceus Dasch, 1974^{c g}
- Mesochorus picticrus Thomson, 1886^{c}
- Mesochorus pictilis Holmgren, 1860^{c g}
- Mesochorus piemontensis Schwenke, 1999^{c g}
- Mesochorus pieridicola (Packard, 1881)^{c g}
- Mesochorus pilicornis (Cameron, 1907)^{c g}
- Mesochorus pilosus Dasch, 1974^{c g}
- Mesochorus pinarae Girault, 1932^{c g}
- Mesochorus pini Schwenke, 1999^{c g}
- Mesochorus pizzighettoneus Schwenke, 1999^{c g}
- Mesochorus placitus Dasch, 1974^{c g}
- Mesochorus planus Dasch, 1974^{c g}
- Mesochorus platygorytos Dasch, 1971^{c g}
- Mesochorus plebejanus Schwenke, 1999^{c g}
- Mesochorus plumosus Dasch, 1971^{c g}
- Mesochorus politus Gravenhorst, 1829^{c g}
- Mesochorus postfurcalis Kokujev, 1927^{c g}
- Mesochorus praeclarus Dasch, 1974^{c g}
- Mesochorus probus Benoit, 1955^{c g}
- Mesochorus procerus Dasch, 1974^{c g}
- Mesochorus prolatus Dasch, 1971^{c g}
- Mesochorus prolixus Dasch, 1974^{c g}
- Mesochorus prominens Dasch, 1974^{c g}
- Mesochorus properatus Dasch, 1974^{c g}
- Mesochorus prothoracicus Schwenke, 1999^{c g}
- Mesochorus provocator Aubert, 1965^{c g}
- Mesochorus pueblicus Dasch, 1974^{c g}
- Mesochorus pullatus Dasch, 1974^{c g}
- Mesochorus pullus Schwenke, 1999^{c g}
- Mesochorus pumilionis Schwenke, 1999^{c g}
- Mesochorus pumilus Dasch, 1974^{c g}
- Mesochorus punctifrons Dasch, 1971^{c g}
- Mesochorus punctipleuris Thomson, 1886^{c g}
- Mesochorus pungens Schwenke, 1999^{c g}
- Mesochorus pusillus Dasch, 1974^{c g}
- Mesochorus puteolus Dasch, 1974^{c g}
- Mesochorus pyramideus Schwenke, 1999^{c g}
- Mesochorus pyrenaeus Schwenke, 1999^{c g}
- Mesochorus quercus Schwenke, 2004^{c g}
- Mesochorus rallus Dasch, 1974^{c g}
- Mesochorus recurvatus Dasch, 1971^{c g}
- Mesochorus reflexus Dasch, 1974^{c g}
- Mesochorus remotus Dasch, 1974^{c g}
- Mesochorus repandus Dasch, 1974^{c g}
- Mesochorus restrictus Dasch, 1971^{c g}
- Mesochorus revocatus Brues, 1910^{c g}
- Mesochorus rhadinus Dasch, 1974^{c g}
- Mesochorus rilaensis Schwenke, 2002^{c g}
- Mesochorus riparius Schwenke, 1999^{c g}
- Mesochorus rivanus Schwenke, 1999^{c g}
- Mesochorus robustus Schwenke, 1999^{c g}
- Mesochorus roccanus Schwenke, 1999^{c g}
- Mesochorus rubeculus Hartig, 1838^{c g}
- Mesochorus rubidus Dasch, 1974^{c g}
- Mesochorus rubranotatus Kusigemati, 1985^{c g}
- Mesochorus rudis Dasch, 1974^{c g}
- Mesochorus ruficornis Brischke, 1880^{c g}
- Mesochorus rufithorax Dasch, 1974^{c g}
- Mesochorus rufoniger Brischke, 1880^{c g}
- Mesochorus rufopetiolatus Schwenke, 1999^{c g}
- Mesochorus rugatus Lee & Suh, 1993^{c g}
- Mesochorus rupesus Schwenke, 1999^{c g}
- Mesochorus russatus Dasch, 1974^{c g}
- Mesochorus rusticus Dasch, 1974^{c g}
- Mesochorus rutilus Schwenke, 2002^{c g}
- Mesochorus sabulosus Dasch, 1971^{c g}
- Mesochorus salicis Thomson, 1886^{c g}
- Mesochorus samarae Schwenke, 1999^{c g}
- Mesochorus sardegnae Schwenke, 1999^{c g}
- Mesochorus savoianus Schwenke, 2004^{c g}
- Mesochorus sawoniewiczi Schwenke, 1999^{c g}
- Mesochorus scabrosus Dasch, 1971^{c g}
- Mesochorus scandinavicus Schwenke, 1999^{c g}
- Mesochorus scaramozzinoi Schwenke, 1999^{c g}
- Mesochorus schwarzi Schwenke, 1999^{c g}
- Mesochorus scopulus Schwenke, 1999^{c g}
- Mesochorus scorteus Dasch, 1974^{c g}
- Mesochorus scrobiculatus Dasch, 1974^{c g}
- Mesochorus sculpturatus Benoit, 1955^{c g}
- Mesochorus scutellaris Schwenke, 2004^{c g}
- Mesochorus sedis Schwenke, 1999^{c g}
- Mesochorus semirufus Holmgren, 1860^{c g}
- Mesochorus seniculus Dasch, 1974^{c g}
- Mesochorus seorakensis Lee & Suh, 1997^{c g}
- Mesochorus septentrionalis Schwenke, 1999^{c g}
- Mesochorus sicculus Dasch, 1974^{c g}
- Mesochorus similaris Dasch, 1974^{c g}
- Mesochorus similis Schwenke, 2002^{c g}
- Mesochorus sinaloensis Dasch, 1974^{c g}
- Mesochorus sincerus Schwenke, 1999^{c g}
- Mesochorus skaneus Schwenke, 1999^{c g}
- Mesochorus slawicus Schwenke, 1999^{c g}
- Mesochorus soderlundi Schwenke, 1999^{c g}
- Mesochorus solidus Dasch, 1971^{c g}
- Mesochorus solitarius Dasch, 1974^{c g}
- Mesochorus solus Schwenke, 1999^{c g}
- Mesochorus sordidus Schwenke, 1999^{c g}
- Mesochorus speciosus Dasch, 1974^{c g}
- Mesochorus spessartaeus Schwenke, 1999^{c g}
- Mesochorus spilotus Dasch, 1974^{c g}
- Mesochorus spinosus Dasch, 1971^{c g}
- Mesochorus stenotus Dasch, 1974^{c g}
- Mesochorus sternalis Schwenke, 1999^{c g}
- Mesochorus stigmator (Thunberg, 1822)^{c g}
- Mesochorus stigmatus Kusigemati, 1985^{c g}
- Mesochorus strigosus Dasch, 1974^{c g}
- Mesochorus stubaianus Schwenke, 2004^{c g}
- Mesochorus styriacus Schwenke, 2002^{c g}
- Mesochorus subfuscus Schwenke, 1999^{c g}
- Mesochorus sublimis Schwenke, 1999^{c g}
- Mesochorus subtilis Dasch, 1974^{c g}
- Mesochorus subulatus Dasch, 1974^{c g}
- Mesochorus sufflatus Schwenke, 1999^{c g}
- Mesochorus sulcatus Dasch, 1971^{c g}
- Mesochorus sulcifer Dasch, 1974^{c g}
- Mesochorus sulphuripes Brischke, 1880^{c g}
- Mesochorus suomiensis Schwenke, 1999^{c g}
- Mesochorus superbus Schwenke, 1999^{c g}
- Mesochorus surinamensis Dasch, 1974^{c g}
- Mesochorus svenssoni Schwenke, 1999^{c g}
- Mesochorus tachinae Ashmead, 1898^{c g}
- Mesochorus tachinidaeus Schwenke, 2002^{c g}
- Mesochorus taeniatus Dasch, 1974^{c g}
- Mesochorus taiwanensis Kusigemati, 1985^{c g}
- Mesochorus takizawai Kusigemati, 1985^{c g}
- Mesochorus tantillus Dasch, 1971^{c g}
- Mesochorus tarnabyanus Schwenke, 1999^{c g}
- Mesochorus tattakensis Uchida, 1933^{c g}
- Mesochorus temporalis Thomson, 1886^{c}
- Mesochorus tenebricosus Dasch, 1974^{c g}
- Mesochorus tenthredinidis Schwenke, 1999^{c g}
- Mesochorus tenuigenae Schwenke, 1999^{c g}
- Mesochorus tenuis Schwenke, 1999^{c g}
- Mesochorus tenuiscapus Thomson, 1886^{c g}
- Mesochorus terebratus Schwenke, 1999^{c g}
- Mesochorus terminalis Dasch, 1974^{c g}
- Mesochorus terrosus Brues, 1910^{c g}
- Mesochorus testaceus Gravenhorst, 1829^{c g}
- Mesochorus tetricus Holmgren, 1860^{c g}
- Mesochorus tibialis Schwenke, 2002^{c g}
- Mesochorus tipularius Gravenhorst, 1829^{c g}
- Mesochorus torosus Dasch, 1974^{c g}
- Mesochorus totonacus Cresson, 1872^{c g}
- Mesochorus townesi Schwenke, 1999^{c g}
- Mesochorus transversus Dasch, 1971^{c g}
- Mesochorus trentinus Schwenke, 1999^{c g}
- Mesochorus triangularis Dasch, 1974^{c g}
- Mesochorus triangulus Schwenke, 1999^{c g}
- Mesochorus trifoveatus Schwenke, 2004^{c g}
- Mesochorus triquetrus Dasch, 1974^{c g}
- Mesochorus trisulcatus Viereck, 1912^{c g}
- Mesochorus trossulus Dasch, 1974^{c g}
- Mesochorus tuberculiger Thomson, 1886^{c g}
- Mesochorus tucumanensis Dasch, 1974^{c g}
- Mesochorus tumidifrons Dasch, 1971^{c g}
- Mesochorus tumidus Dasch, 1974^{c g}
- Mesochorus tundracolus Dasch, 1971^{c g}
- Mesochorus turbidus Schwenke, 1999^{c g}
- Mesochorus turgidus Dasch, 1974^{c g}
- Mesochorus tyroliensis Schwenke, 1999^{c g}
- Mesochorus ukiahensis Dasch, 1971^{c g}
- Mesochorus unicarinatus Dasch, 1971^{c g}
- Mesochorus uniformis Cresson, 1872^{c g b}
- Mesochorus vafer Dasch, 1974^{c g}
- Mesochorus valdierius Schwenke, 1999^{c g}
- Mesochorus validus Dasch, 1971^{c g}
- Mesochorus varianus Dasch, 1971^{c g}
- Mesochorus varius Schwenke, 1999^{c g}
- Mesochorus vejanus Schwenke, 1999^{c g}
- Mesochorus velatus Dasch, 1974^{c g}
- Mesochorus velox Holmgren, 1860^{c g}
- Mesochorus veluminis Schwenke, 1999^{c g}
- Mesochorus venerandus Schwenke, 1999^{c g}
- Mesochorus venustus Dasch, 1974^{c g}
- Mesochorus veracruzi Dasch, 1974^{c g}
- Mesochorus verecundus Dasch, 1974^{c g}
- Mesochorus versicolor Dasch, 1974^{c g}
- Mesochorus versiculus Dasch, 1974^{c g}
- Mesochorus versuranus Schwenke, 1999^{c g}
- Mesochorus versutus Dasch, 1974^{c g}
- Mesochorus vetulus Dasch, 1974^{c g}
- Mesochorus viator Schwenke, 2004^{c g}
- Mesochorus villosus Dasch, 1974^{c g}
- Mesochorus vinnulus Dasch, 1974^{c g}
- Mesochorus virgatus Schwenke, 1999^{c g}
- Mesochorus vittator (Zetterstedt, 1838)^{c g}
- Mesochorus vitticollis Holmgren, 1860^{c g}
- Mesochorus windsorianus Schwenke, 2004^{c g}
- Mesochorus xanthurus Dasch, 1974^{c g}
- Mesochorus yosemite Dasch, 1971^{c g}
- Mesochorus zoerneri Schwenke, 1999^{c g}
- Mesochorus zonatus Dasch, 1974^{c g}
- Mesochorus zwakhalsi Schwenke, 2004^{c g}
- Mesochorus zwettleus Schwenke, 1999^{c g}
- Mesochorus zygaenae Schwenke, 1999^{c g}
- Mesochorus zyganaus Schwenke, 1999^{c g}

Data sources: i = ITIS, c = Catalogue of Life, g = GBIF, b = Bugguide.net
