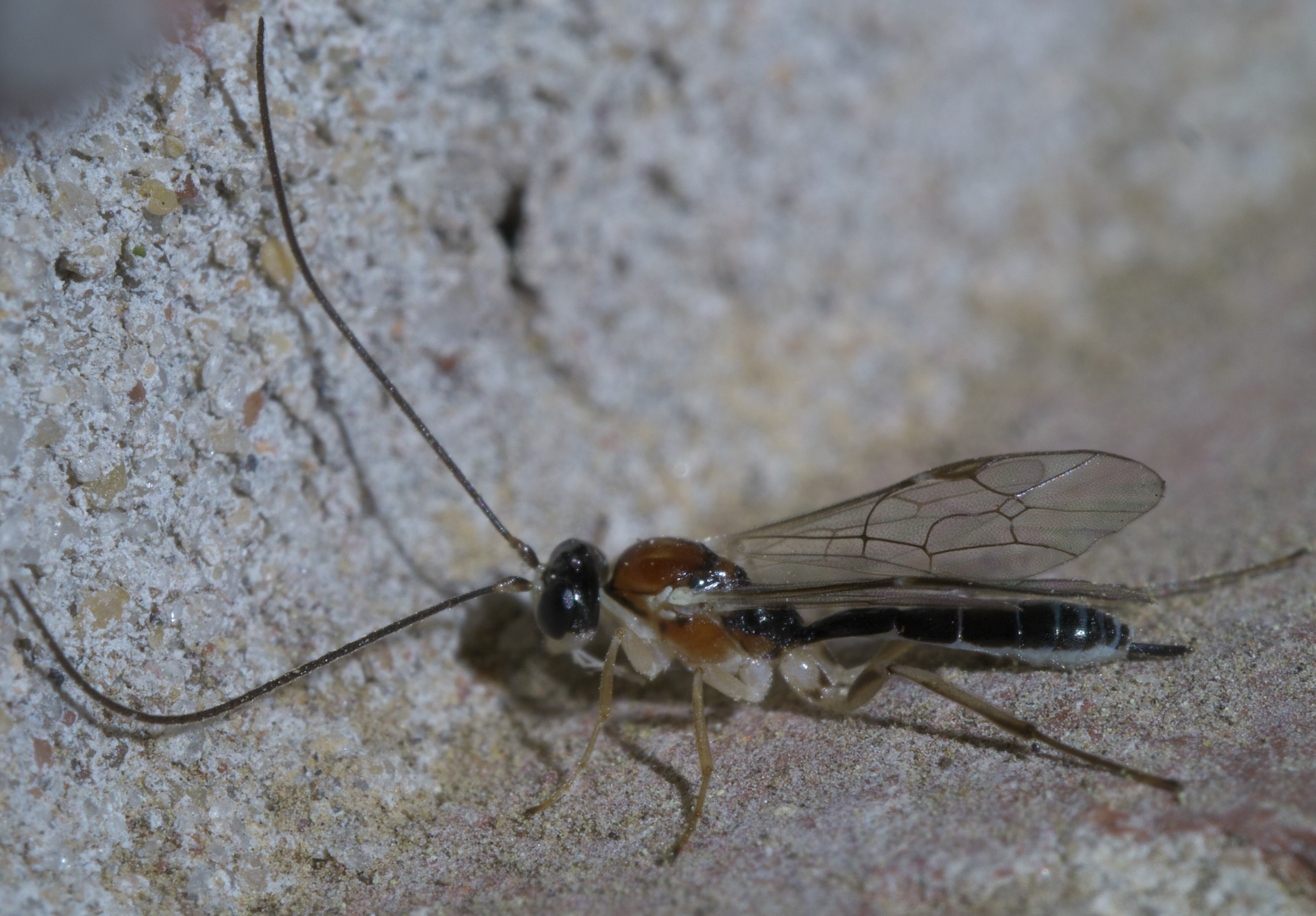

Scientific classification
- Kingdom: Animalia
- Phylum: Arthropoda
- Class: Insecta
- Order: Hymenoptera
- Family: Ichneumonidae
- Subfamily: Mesochorinae
- Genus: Mesochorus; Gravenhorst, 1829

= Mesochorus =

Genus of wasps

Mesochorus is a genus of ichneumon wasps in the family Ichneumonidae. There are at least 690 described species in Mesochorus.

== See also ==
- List of Mesochorus species
