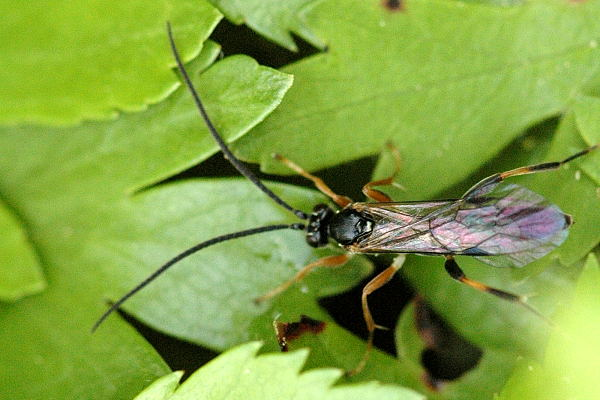
- Exochus prosopius

Scientific classification
- Kingdom: Animalia
- Phylum: Arthropoda
- Clade: Pancrustacea
- Class: Insecta
- Order: Hymenoptera
- Family: Ichneumonidae
- Subfamily: Metopiinae; Förster, 1869

= Metopiinae =

Subfamily of wasps

The Metopiinae are a worldwide subfamily of the parasitic wasp family Ichneumonidae. Metopiinae are koinobiont endoparasitoids of Lepidoptera. There are 26 extant genera. A bulging shield-like face is diagnostic for members of this subfamily, but many members lack this character.

== Description ==
Most Metopiines are medium to large ichneumonids. They have a bulging face and with no groove between the face and clypeus. In most genera the upper portion of the face forms a triangular process that extends between the antennae. Many have stout, robust legs and generally have short ovipositors. Larger species may mimic aculeate wasps in coloration and by producing buzzing noises when captured.

== Biology ==
Metopiines oviposit into the larval stage of their host and emerge fully developed from the host pupae. Many metopiines attack leaf rolling caterpillars. The wasp's stout legs and smooth face may be used to help females push their way into the leaf roll so they may reach the host with their short ovipositor. Adult females may bite hosts in order to feed on their hemolymph.

== List of genera ==
- Acerataspis
- Bothromus
- Carria
- Chorinaeus
- Colpotrochia
- Cubus
- Drepanoctonus
- Exochus
- Forrestopius
- Hemimetopius
- Hypsicera
- Ischryocnemis
- Lapton
- Leurus
- Macromalon
- Metopius
- Periope
- Pseudometopius
- Soliga
- Sciron
- Scolomus (=Apolophus)
- Seticornuta
- Spudeaus
- Stethoncus
- Synosis
- Trieces
- Triclistus
