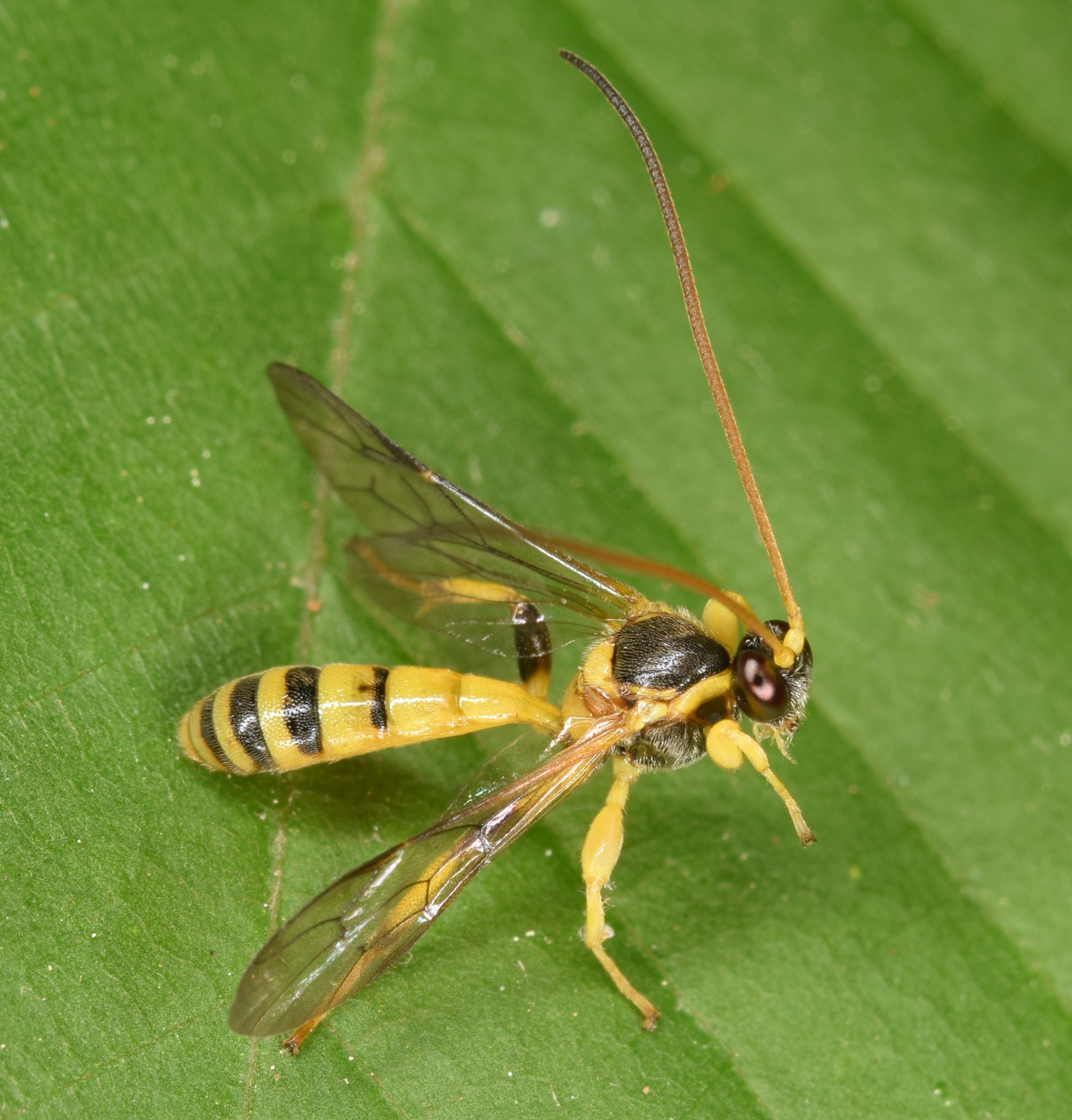
- Colpotrochia crassipes

Scientific classification
- Kingdom: Animalia
- Phylum: Arthropoda
- Class: Insecta
- Order: Hymenoptera
- Family: Ichneumonidae
- Subfamily: Metopiinae
- Genus: Colpotrochia; Holmgren, 1856

Synonyms
- Colpotrichia Strobl, 1900 (missp.)

= Colpotrochia =

Genus of insects

Colpotrochia is a genus of ichneumon wasps in the family Ichneumonidae. There are at least 61 described species in Colpotrochia.
