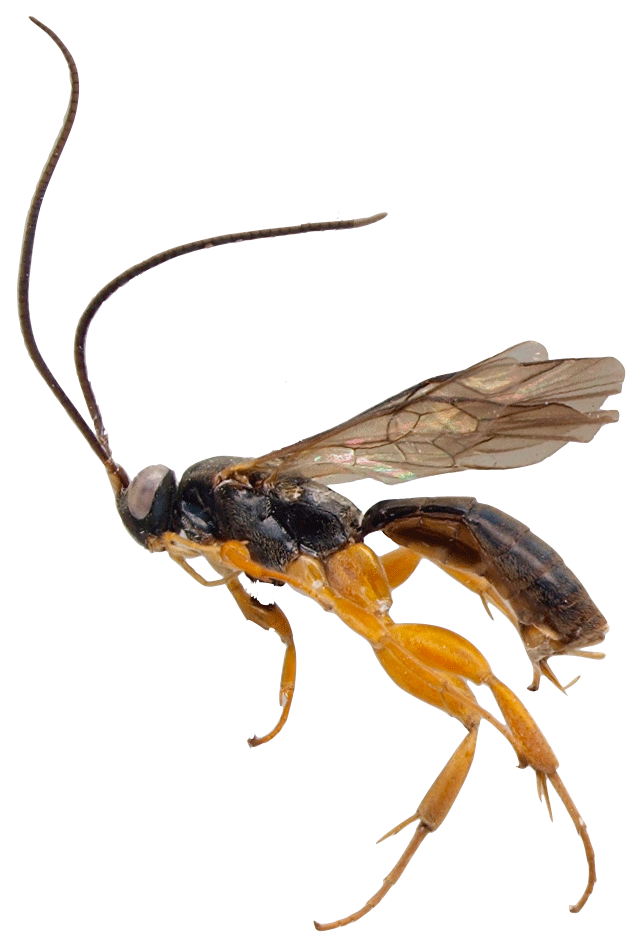

Scientific classification
- Kingdom: Animalia
- Phylum: Arthropoda
- Class: Insecta
- Order: Hymenoptera
- Family: Ichneumonidae
- Subfamily: Metopiinae
- Genus: Exochus; Gravenhorst, 1829

= Exochus =

Genus of insects

Exochus is a genus of ichneumon wasps in the family Ichneumonidae. There are at least 270 described species in Exochus.

== See also ==
- List of Exochus species
