= List of Exochus species =

This is a list of 271 species in Exochus, a genus of ichneumon wasps in the family Ichneumonidae.

== Exochus species ==
- Exochus abdominalis Tolkanitz, 2003^{c g}
- Exochus ablatus Gauld & Sithole, 2002^{c g}
- Exochus aenigmatosus Tolkanitz, 1999^{c g}
- Exochus aizankeanus Kusigemati, 1971^{c g}
- Exochus albiceps Walsh, 1873^{c g}
- Exochus albicinctus Holmgren, 1873^{c g}
- Exochus albifrons Cresson, 1868^{c b}
- Exochus alpinus (Zetterstedt, 1838)^{c g}
- Exochus angularis Kusigemati, 1971^{c g}
- Exochus annulicrus Walsh, 1873^{c g}
- Exochus annulitarsis Thomson, 1887^{c g}
- Exochus antennalis Tolkanitz, 1992^{c g}
- Exochus antiquus Haliday, 1838^{c g}
- Exochus antis Tolkanitz, 2003^{c g}
- Exochus appendiculatus Cameron, 1902^{c g}
- Exochus areolatus Hedwig, 1939^{c g}
- Exochus argutus Tolkanitz, 1993^{c g}
- Exochus armillosus Townes & Townes, 1959^{c g}
- Exochus assimilis Kusigemati, 1984^{c g}
- Exochus ater Tolkanitz, 1993^{c g}
- Exochus atriceps Walsh, 1873^{c g}
- Exochus atrofemoratus Tolkanitz, 1993^{c g}
- Exochus avinus Gauld & Sithole, 2002^{c g}
- Exochus belokobylskii Tolkanitz, 2001^{c g}
- Exochus bessus Gauld & Sithole, 2002^{c g}
- Exochus bicoloripes Kusigemati, 1971^{c g}
- Exochus bifasciatus Kusigemati, 1971^{c g}
- Exochus bimaculatus Kusigemati, 1984^{c g}
- Exochus bolivari Seyrig, 1927^{c g}
- Exochus borealis Kusigemati, 1971^{c g}
- Exochus boxatus Gauld & Sithole, 2002^{c g}
- Exochus britannicus Morley, 1911^{c g}
- Exochus brutus Townes & Townes, 1959^{c g}
- Exochus bryanti Townes & Townes, 1959^{c g}
- Exochus canidens Townes & Townes, 1959^{c g}
- Exochus capnodes Townes & Townes, 1959^{c g}
- Exochus captus Brues, 1910^{c g}
- Exochus carens Tolkanitz, 2003^{c g}
- Exochus carnitus Gauld & Sithole, 2002^{c g}
- Exochus carri Schmiedeknecht, 1924^{c g}
- Exochus castaniventris Brauns, 1896^{c g}
- Exochus caudatus Kusigemati, 1971^{c g}
- Exochus cephalotes Tolkanitz, 2007^{c g}
- Exochus certus Tolkanitz, 2003^{c g}
- Exochus citripes Thomson, 1887^{c g}
- Exochus cnemidotus Townes & Townes, 1959^{c g}
- Exochus cohrsi Habermehl, 1923^{c g}
- Exochus collaborator Seyrig, 1934^{c g}
- Exochus compar Seyrig, 1934^{c g}
- Exochus compressiventris Ratzeburg, 1848^{c g}
- Exochus concitus Tolkanitz, 2001^{c g}
- Exochus consimilis Holmgren, 1858^{c g}
- Exochus convergens Kusigemati, 1971^{c g}
- Exochus convexus Tolkanitz, 2003^{c g}
- Exochus coronatus Gravenhorst, 1829^{c g}
- Exochus coronellus Morley, 1913^{c g}
- Exochus cuneatus Townes & Townes, 1959^{c g}
- Exochus curvinus Gauld & Sithole, 2002^{c g}
- Exochus daisetsuzanus Kusigemati, 1987^{c g}
- Exochus decoratus ^{b}
- Exochus delopius Gauld & Sithole, 2002^{c g}
- Exochus denotatus Townes & Townes, 1959^{c g}
- Exochus dentifrons Townes & Townes, 1959^{c g}
- Exochus derasus Tolkanitz, 2003^{c g}
- Exochus destitutus Tolkanitz, 2003^{c g}
- Exochus dilatatus Tolkanitz, 2003^{c g}
- Exochus dominus Seyrig, 1934^{c g}
- Exochus dondus Gauld & Sithole, 2002^{c g}
- Exochus dorsalis Cresson, 1864^{c g}
- Exochus echigoensis Kusigemati, 1987^{c g}
- Exochus elimatus Townes & Townes, 1959^{c g}
- Exochus enodis Townes & Townes, 1959^{c g}
- Exochus erythrinus Holmgren, 1868^{c g}
- Exochus erythronotus (Gravenhorst, 1820)^{c g}
- Exochus evetriae Rohwer, 1920^{c g}
- Exochus evitus Gauld & Sithole, 2002^{c g}
- Exochus externus Townes & Townes, 1959^{c g}
- Exochus farmellus Gauld & Sithole, 2002^{c g}
- Exochus fasciatus Strobl, 1903^{c g}
- Exochus fastigatus Townes & Townes, 1959^{c g}
- Exochus ferus Tolkanitz, 1993^{c g}
- Exochus fidus Tolkanitz, 2003^{c g}
- Exochus firmus Kusigemati, 1971^{c g}
- Exochus flavicaput Morley, 1913^{c g}
- Exochus flavidus Hellen, 1949^{c g}
- Exochus flavifacies Kusigemati, 1984^{c g}
- Exochus flavifrons Boheman, 1863^{c g}
- Exochus flavifrontalis Davis, 1897^{c g}
- Exochus flavinotum Morley, 1913^{c g}
- Exochus flavipes Tolkanitz, 1999^{c g}
- Exochus flavomarginatus Holmgren, 1856^{c g}
- Exochus flavonotatus Kusigemati, 1983^{c g}
- Exochus fletcheri Bridgman, 1884^{c g}
- Exochus flexus Tolkanitz, 2003^{c g}
- Exochus flubinus Gauld & Sithole, 2002^{c g}
- Exochus foveolatus Schmiedeknecht, 1924^{c g}
- Exochus frater Seyrig, 1934^{c g}
- Exochus frontellus Holmgren, 1858^{c g}
- Exochus fuscipennis Szepligeti, 1910^{c g}
- Exochus gascus Gauld & Sithole, 2002^{c g}
- Exochus genualis Townes & Townes, 1959^{c g}
- Exochus grandis Tolkanitz, 2003^{c g}
- Exochus gratus Tolkanitz, 2003^{c g}
- Exochus gravipes (Gravenhorst, 1820)^{c g}
- Exochus gravis Gravenhorst, 1829^{c g}
- Exochus guttatus Tolkanitz, 1999^{c g}
- Exochus hiraniwensis Kusigemati, 1971^{c g}
- Exochus hirsutus Tolkanitz, 1993^{c g}
- Exochus hiulcus Townes & Townes, 1959^{c g}
- Exochus hormus Gauld & Sithole, 2002^{c g}
- Exochus horridus Tolkanitz, 2001^{c g}
- Exochus humerator Aubert, 1960^{c g}
- Exochus intermedius Morley, 1911^{c g}
- Exochus izbus Gauld & Sithole, 2002^{c g}
- Exochus jacintus Gauld & Sithole, 2002^{c g}
- Exochus kanayamensis Kusigemati, 1971^{c g}
- Exochus karazini Tolkanitz, 1993^{c g}
- Exochus kasparyani Tolkanitz, 2001^{c g}
- Exochus kaszabi Kusigemati, 1984^{c g}
- Exochus kozlovi Tolkanitz, 2001^{c g}
- Exochus krellus Gauld & Sithole, 2002^{c g}
- Exochus kusigematii Tolkanitz, 2007^{c g}
- Exochus kuslitzkyi Tolkanitz, 2003^{c g}
- Exochus lascus Gauld & Sithole, 2002^{c g}
- Exochus latiareolus Tolkanitz, 2003^{c g}
- Exochus latifasciatus Kusigemati, 1971^{c g}
- Exochus latro (Seyrig, 1934)^{c g}
- Exochus lenis Tolkanitz, 2003^{c g}
- Exochus lentipes Gravenhorst, 1829^{c g}
- Exochus leptomma Chiu, 1962^{c g}
- Exochus lictor Haliday, 1838^{c g}
- Exochus limbatus Tolkanitz, 1993^{c g}
- Exochus lineifrons Thomson, 1887^{c g}
- Exochus litus Townes & Townes, 1959^{c g}
- Exochus longicaudis Chiu, 1962^{c g}
- Exochus lucidus Riggio & De Stefani, 1888^{c g}
- Exochus mandschukuonis Uchida, 1942^{c g}
- Exochus marginalis Kusigemati, 1984^{c g}
- Exochus marklini Holmgren, 1858^{c g}
- Exochus megadon Townes & Townes, 1959^{c g}
- Exochus melanius Tolkanitz, 1999^{c g}
- Exochus mesodon Townes & Townes, 1959^{c g}
- Exochus mesorufus Townes & Townes, 1959^{c g}
- Exochus mirus Tolkanitz, 2003^{c g}
- Exochus mitratus Gravenhorst, 1829^{c g}
- Exochus moeus Gauld & Sithole, 2002^{c g}
- Exochus momoii Tolkanitz, 2007^{c g}
- Exochus monticola Tolkanitz, 1999^{c g}
- Exochus montivagus Townes & Townes, 1959^{c g}
- Exochus morionellus Holmgren, 1858^{c g}
- Exochus multicinctus Strobl, 1904^{c g}
- Exochus multicintus Strobl, 1904^{g}
- Exochus muscanus Gauld & Sithole, 2002^{c g}
- Exochus nasuzanus Kusigemati, 1971^{c g}
- Exochus navitus Gauld & Sithole, 2002^{c g}
- Exochus nigrifaciatus Momoi, Kusigemati & Nakanishi, 1968^{c g}
- Exochus nigripalpis Thomson, 1887^{c b}
- Exochus nigriparvus Kusigemati, 1984^{c g}
- Exochus nubosus Gauld & Sithole, 2002^{c g}
- Exochus obezus Gauld & Sithole, 2002^{c g}
- Exochus obscurus Tolkanitz, 1999^{c g}
- Exochus ochreatus Townes & Townes, 1959^{c g}
- Exochus ornatus Momoi & Kusigemati, 1970^{c g}
- Exochus oshimensis Uchida, 1930^{c g}
- Exochus ostentatus Davis, 1897^{c g}
- Exochus ozanus Gauld & Sithole, 2002^{c g}
- Exochus pallipes (Motschoulsky, 1863)^{c g}
- Exochus pappi Kusigemati, 1984^{c g}
- Exochus parnassicus Hedwig, 1939^{c g}
- Exochus passaventi Seyrig, 1934^{c g}
- Exochus pedanticus Gauld & Sithole, 2002^{c g}
- Exochus perfectus Kusigemati, 1983^{c g}
- Exochus peroniae Townes & Townes, 1959^{c g}
- Exochus pictus Holmgren, 1858^{c g}
- Exochus pilosus Tolkanitz, 2003^{c g}
- Exochus pleuralis Cresson, 1864^{c g}
- Exochus plicatus Tolkanitz, 1999^{c g}
- Exochus postfurcalis Townes & Townes, 1959^{c g}
- Exochus posticus Kusigemati, 1983^{c g}
- Exochus prosopius Gravenhorst, 1829^{c g}
- Exochus protector Seyrig, 1934^{c g}
- Exochus pubitus Gauld & Sithole, 2002^{c g}
- Exochus pulchripes Cresson, 1868^{c g}
- Exochus pullatus Townes & Townes, 1959^{c g}
- Exochus punctatus Kusigemati, 1984^{c g}
- Exochus puncticeps Cameron, 1886^{c g}
- Exochus punctus Holmgren, 1858^{c g}
- Exochus quadradens Townes & Townes, 1959^{c g}
- Exochus quadrimaculatus Schmiedeknecht, 1924^{c g}
- Exochus quozus Gauld & Sithole, 2002^{c g}
- Exochus radialis Uchida, 1932^{c g}
- Exochus ratzeburgi Holmgren, 1858^{c g}
- Exochus ravetus Gauld & Sithole, 2002^{c g}
- Exochus rectus Tolkanitz^{c g}
- Exochus rombastus Gauld & Sithole, 2002^{c g}
- Exochus rubellus Gauld & Sithole, 2002^{c g}
- Exochus rubroater Schmiedeknecht, 1924^{c g}
- Exochus rufator Aubert, 1963^{c g}
- Exochus rufigaster Kusigemati, 1971^{c g}
- Exochus rufipleuralis Kusigemati, 1987^{c g}
- Exochus russeus Townes & Townes, 1959^{c g}
- Exochus rutilatus Townes & Townes, 1959^{c g b}
- Exochus saigusai Kusigemati, 1983^{c g}
- Exochus scutellaris Chiu, 1962^{c g}
- Exochus selenanae Tolkanitz, 1999^{c g}
- Exochus semiflavus Cushman, 1937^{c g}
- Exochus semilividus Vollenhoven, 1875^{c g}
- Exochus semirufus Cresson, 1868^{c g b}
- Exochus separandus Schmiedeknecht, 1924^{c g}
- Exochus septentrionalis Holmgren, 1873^{c g}
- Exochus serozus Gauld & Sithole, 2002^{c g}
- Exochus setaceous Kusigemati, 1971^{c g}
- Exochus signatus Habermehl, 1925^{c g}
- Exochus signifer Townes & Townes, 1959^{c g}
- Exochus signifrons Thomson, 1887^{c g}
- Exochus silus Townes & Townes, 1959^{c g}
- Exochus similis Tolkanitz, 1992^{c g}
- Exochus simulans Tolkanitz, 2003^{c g}
- Exochus spilotus Townes & Townes, 1959^{c g b}
- Exochus spinalis Townes & Townes, 1959^{c g}
- Exochus spurcus Kusigemati, 1984^{c g}
- Exochus stenostoma Townes & Townes, 1959^{c g}
- Exochus stenus Chiu, 1962^{c g}
- Exochus stramineipes Cameron, 1886^{c g}
- Exochus suborbitalis Schmiedeknecht, 1924^{c g}
- Exochus suvanus Gauld & Sithole, 2002^{c g}
- Exochus synosialis Tolkanitz, 1999^{c g}
- Exochus szepligetii Bajari, 1961^{c g}
- Exochus taigensis Tolkanitz, 2001^{c g}
- Exochus tardigradus Gravenhorst, 1829^{c g}
- Exochus taximus Gauld & Sithole, 2002^{c g}
- Exochus teborus Gauld & Sithole, 2002^{c g}
- Exochus tectus Tolkanitz, 1993^{c g}
- Exochus tegularis Ashmead, 1894^{c g}
- Exochus tenebrosus Townes & Townes, 1959^{c g}
- Exochus tenius Tolkanitz, 2003^{c g}
- Exochus testaceus Tolkanitz, 1999^{c g}
- Exochus thomsoni Schmiedeknecht, 1924^{c g}
- Exochus tibialis Holmgren, 1858^{c g}
- Exochus transversus Townes & Townes, 1959^{c g}
- Exochus tumulus Gauld & Sithole, 2002^{c g}
- Exochus turgidus Holmgren, 1858^{c g}
- Exochus tutor Seyrig, 1934^{c g}
- Exochus tuxedus Gauld & Sithole, 2002^{c g}
- Exochus ubus Gauld & Sithole, 2002^{c g}
- Exochus ulanbaatorensis Kusigemati, 1984^{c g}
- Exochus unidentatus Uchida, 1952^{c g}
- Exochus upembaensis Benoit, 1965^{c g}
- Exochus urzus Gauld & Sithole, 2002^{c g}
- Exochus utilis Tolkanitz, 2003^{c g}
- Exochus vafer Holmgren, 1873^{c g}
- Exochus vanitus Gauld & Sithole, 2002^{c g}
- Exochus variegatus Tolkanitz, 1993^{c g}
- Exochus varipes Tolkanitz, 1993^{c g}
- Exochus velatus Tolkanitz, 2003^{c g}
- Exochus ventricosus Townes & Townes, 1959^{c g}
- Exochus vexator Tolkanitz, 1993^{c g}
- Exochus villosus Tolkanitz, 2003^{c g}
- Exochus virgatifrons Townes & Townes, 1959^{c g}
- Exochus vlops Gauld & Sithole, 2002^{c g}
- Exochus voxanus Gauld & Sithole, 2002^{c g}
- Exochus wabitus Gauld & Sithole, 2002^{c g}
- Exochus washingtonensis (Davis, 1897)^{c g}
- Exochus xanthopus Cameron, 1902^{c g}
- Exochus xarus Gauld & Sithole, 2002^{c g}
- Exochus xetus Gauld & Sithole, 2002^{c g}
- Exochus yalupus Gauld & Sithole, 2002^{c g}
- Exochus yasumatsui Momoi, Kusigemati & Nakanishi, 1968^{c g}
- Exochus yorizus Gauld & Sithole, 2002^{c g}
- Exochus zabus Gauld & Sithole, 2002^{c g}
- Exochus zyxus Gauld & Sithole, 2002^{c g}

Data sources: i = ITIS, c = Catalogue of Life, g = GBIF, b = Bugguide.net

== Synonyms? ==
- Exochus incidens Thomson, 1887
