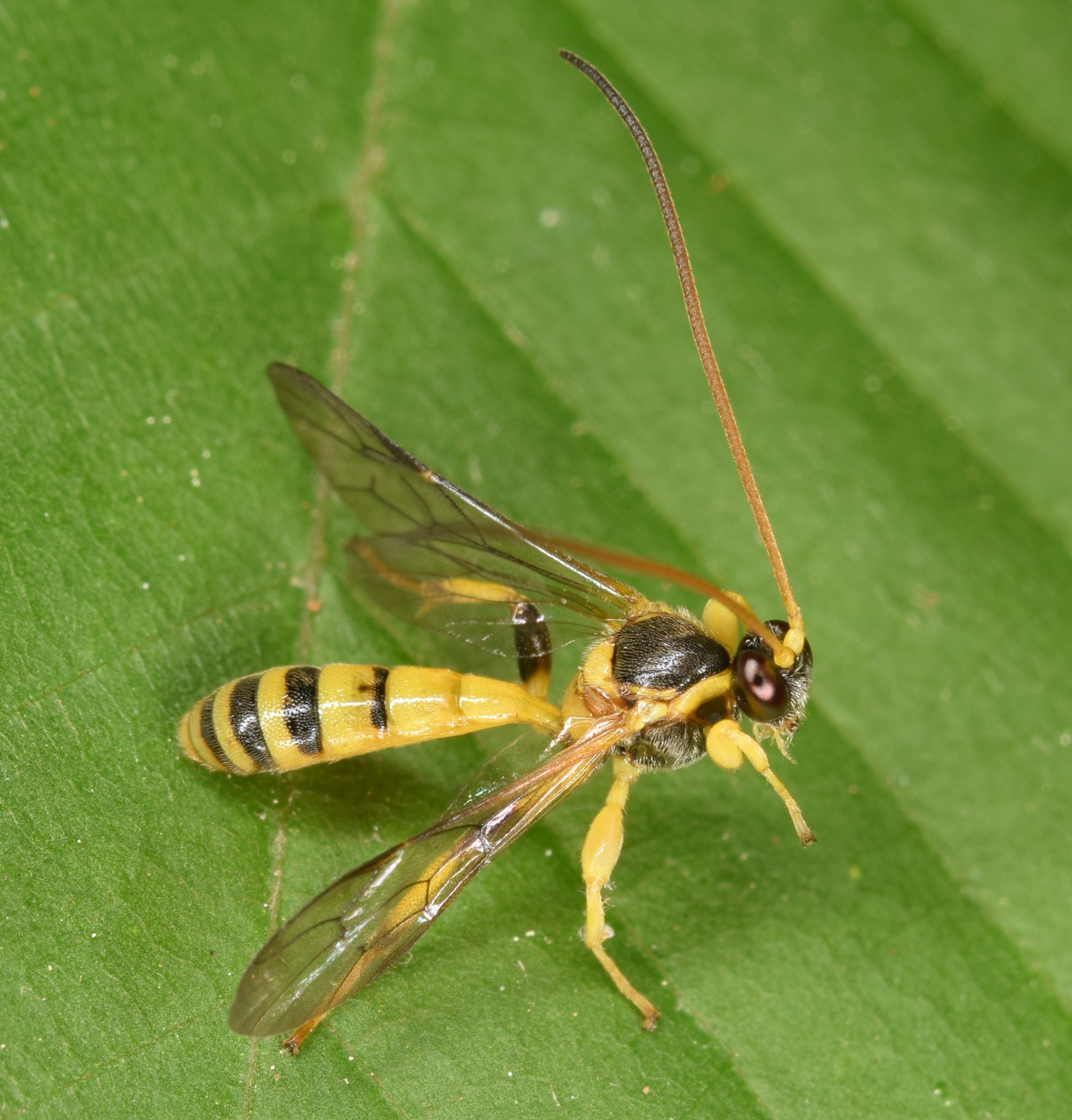

Scientific classification
- Domain: Eukaryota
- Kingdom: Animalia
- Phylum: Arthropoda
- Class: Insecta
- Order: Hymenoptera
- Family: Ichneumonidae
- Genus: Colpotrochia
- Species: C. crassipes

Binomial name
- Colpotrochia crassipes (Provancher, 1886)

= Colpotrochia crassipes =

Species of wasp

Colpotrochia crassipes is a species of ichneumon wasp in the family Ichneumonidae.
