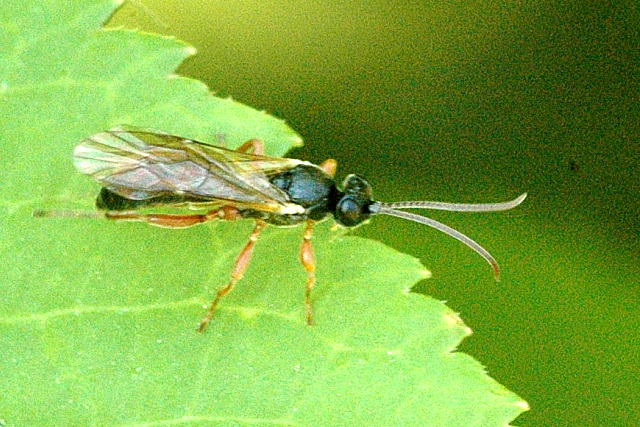
- Triclistus pallipes

Scientific classification
- Kingdom: Animalia
- Phylum: Arthropoda
- Class: Insecta
- Order: Hymenoptera
- Family: Ichneumonidae
- Subfamily: Metopiinae
- Genus: Triclistus; Förster, 1869

= Triclistus =

Genus of wasps

Triclistus is a genus of ichneumon wasps in the family Ichneumonidae. There are at least 90 described species in Triclistus.

== Species ==
These 91 species belong to the genus Triclistus:

- Triclistus adustus Townes & Townes, 1959^{c g}
- Triclistus aethiops (Gravenhorst, 1829)^{c g}
- Triclistus aitkeni (Cameron, 1897)^{c g}
- Triclistus aitkini (Cameron, 1897)^{g}
- Triclistus alaris Benoit, 1954^{c g}
- Triclistus albicinctus Thomson, 1887^{c g}
- Triclistus alpinator Aubert, 1969^{c g}
- Triclistus amazopeikkus^{g}
- Triclistus anareolatus Benoit, 1965^{c g}
- Triclistus anthophilae Aeschlimann, 1983^{c g}
- Triclistus areolatus Thomson, 1887^{c g}
- Triclistus aruwimiensis Benoit, 1954^{c g}
- Triclistus ashaninka^{g}
- Triclistus bicolor Szépligeti, 1908^{c g}
- Triclistus brunnipes (Cresson, 1879)^{c g}
- Triclistus castilloai^{g}
- Triclistus cholo^{g}
- Triclistus chosis Townes & Townes, 1959^{c g}
- Triclistus concitus Tolkanitz, 1994^{c g}
- Triclistus congener (Holmgren, 1858)^{c g}
- Triclistus congoensis Benoit, 1955^{c g}
- Triclistus consimilis Benoit, 1965^{c g}
- Triclistus crassus Townes & Townes, 1959^{c g}
- Triclistus dauricus Tolkanitz, 1992^{c g}
- Triclistus dimidiatus Morley, 1913^{c g}
- Triclistus emarginalus (Say, 1829)^{c g b}
- Triclistus epermeniae Shaw & Aeschlimann, 1994^{c g}
- Triclistus evexus Townes & Townes, 1959^{c g}
- Triclistus facialis Thomson, 1887^{c g}
- Triclistus glabrosus Momoi & Kusigemati, 1970^{c g}
- Triclistus globulipes (Desvignes, 1856)^{c g}
- Triclistus hostis Seyrig, 1934^{c g}
- Triclistus inimicus Seyrig, 1934^{c g}
- Triclistus inti^{g}
- Triclistus japonicus Kusigemati, 1971^{c g}
- Triclistus kamijoi Momoi & Kusigemati, 1970^{c g}
- Triclistus kivuensis Benoit, 1965^{c g}
- Triclistus kotenkoi Tolkanitz, 1992^{c g}
- Triclistus laevigatus (Ratzeburg, 1844)^{c g}
- Triclistus lativentris Thomson, 1887^{c g}
- Triclistus lewi Chiu, 1962^{c g}
- Triclistus longicalcar Thomson, 1887^{c g}
- Triclistus luteicornis Benoit, 1954^{c g}
- Triclistus mandibularis Kusigemati, 1985^{c g}
- Triclistus matsiguenga^{g}
- Triclistus megantoni^{g}
- Triclistus melanocephalus (Cameron, 1886)^{c g}
- Triclistus mellizas Gauld & Sithole, 2002^{c g}
- Triclistus meridiator Aubert, 1984^{c g}
- Triclistus mimerastriae Kusigemati, 1971^{c g}
- Triclistus minutus Carlson, 1966^{c g}
- Triclistus muqui^{g}
- Triclistus niger (Bridgman, 1883)^{c}
- Triclistus nigrifemoralis Kusigemati, 1971^{c g}
- Triclistus nigripes Momoi & Kusigemati, 1970^{c g}
- Triclistus obsoletus Kusigemati, 1984^{c g}
- Triclistus occidentis Townes & Townes, 1959^{c g}
- Triclistus pailas Gauld & Sithole, 2002^{c g}
- Triclistus pallipes Holmgren, 1873^{c g b}
- Triclistus parallelus Uchida, 1932^{c g}
- Triclistus parasitus Seyrig, 1934^{c g}
- Triclistus parvulus Kusigemati, 1980^{c g}
- Triclistus planus Momoi & Kusigemati, 1970^{c g}
- Triclistus podagricus (Gravenhorst, 1829)^{c g b}
- Triclistus politifacies Kusigemati, 1987^{c g}
- Triclistus propinquus (Cresson, 1868)^{c}
- Triclistus proximator Aubert, 1984^{c g}
- Triclistus pubiventris Thomson, 1887^{c}
- Triclistus pygmaeus (Cresson, 1864)^{c g}
- Triclistus pyrellae Tolkanitz, 1983^{c g}
- Triclistus rebellis Seyrig, 1934^{c g}
- Triclistus rectus Townes & Townes, 1959^{c g}
- Triclistus rivwus Gauld & Sithole, 2002^{c g}
- Triclistus rubellus Kusigemati, 1971^{c g}
- Triclistus semistriatus Kusigemati, 1971^{c g}
- Triclistus slimellus Gauld & Sithole, 2002^{c g}
- Triclistus sonani Chiu, 1962^{c g}
- Triclistus spiracularis Thomson, 1887^{c g}
- Triclistus squalidus (Holmgren, 1858)^{c g}
- Triclistus tabetus Gauld & Sithole, 2002^{c g}
- Triclistus talitzkii Tolkanitz, 1983^{c g}
- Triclistus traditor Seyrig, 1934^{c g}
- Triclistus transfuga Seyrig, 1934^{c g}
- Triclistus uchidai Kusigemati, 1971^{c g}
- Triclistus upembaensis Benoit, 1965^{c g}
- Triclistus vaxinus Gauld & Sithole, 2002^{c g}
- Triclistus warmi^{g}
- Triclistus xodius Gauld & Sithole, 2002^{c g}
- Triclistus xylostellae Barron & Bisdee, 1984^{c g}
- Triclistus yponomeutae Aeschlimann, 1973^{c g}
- Triclistus yungas^{g}

Data sources: i = ITIS, c = Catalogue of Life, g = GBIF, b = Bugguide.net
