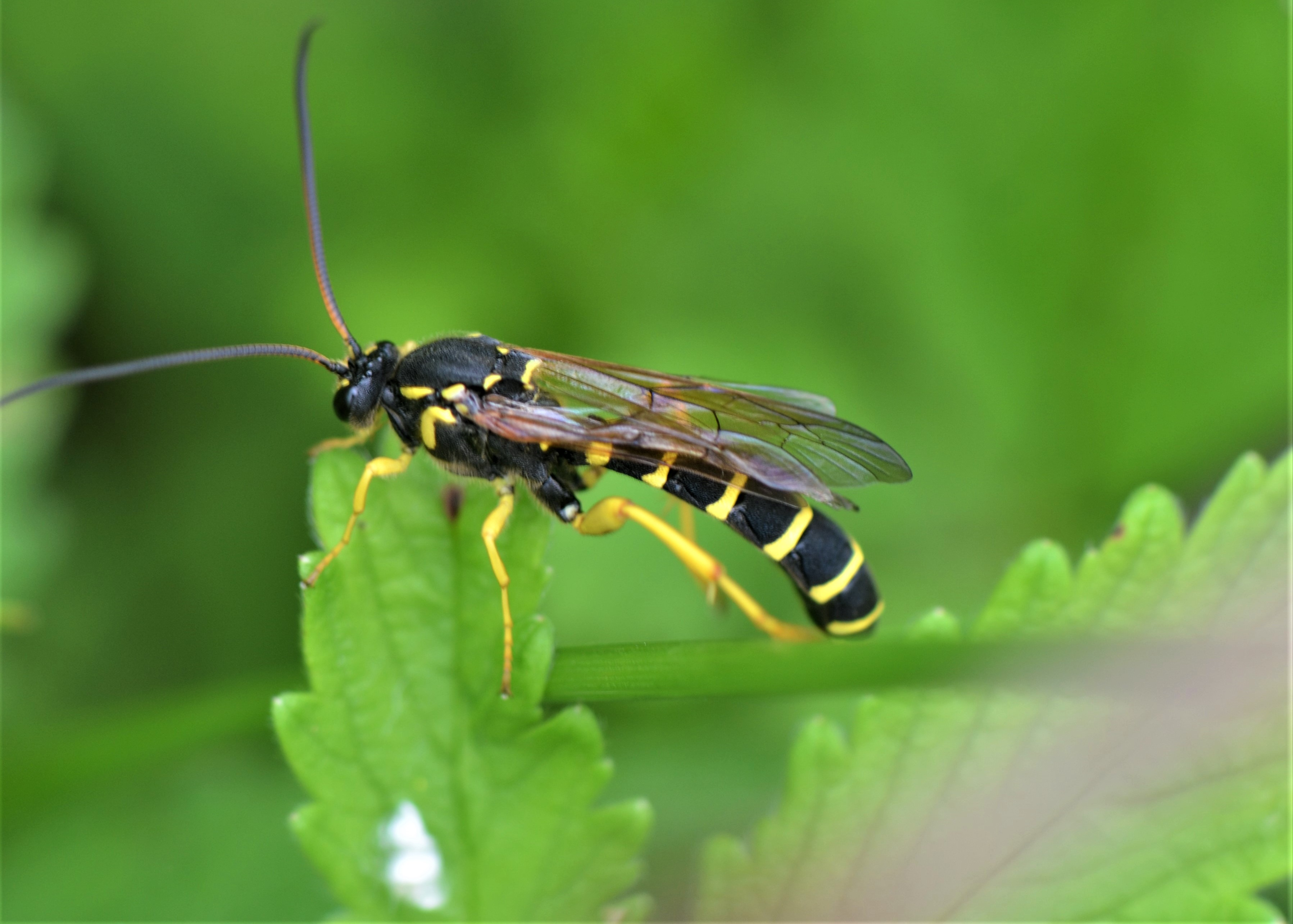
- Metopius dentatus

Scientific classification
- Domain: Eukaryota
- Kingdom: Animalia
- Phylum: Arthropoda
- Class: Insecta
- Order: Hymenoptera
- Family: Ichneumonidae
- Subfamily: Metopiinae
- Genus: Metopius; Panzer 1806

= Metopius (wasp) =

Genus of wasps

Metopius is a cosmopolitan genus of parasitoid ichneumon wasps in the subfamily Metopiinae. They lay eggs inside caterpillars of Lepidoptera that are found in leaf rolls, and the adult wasps later emerge from the pupa. They are black and yellow striped and reach over 2 cm (0.79 in) in length. Their coloring may be mimicking potter wasps. Metopius spp. make a buzzing noise when captured.
