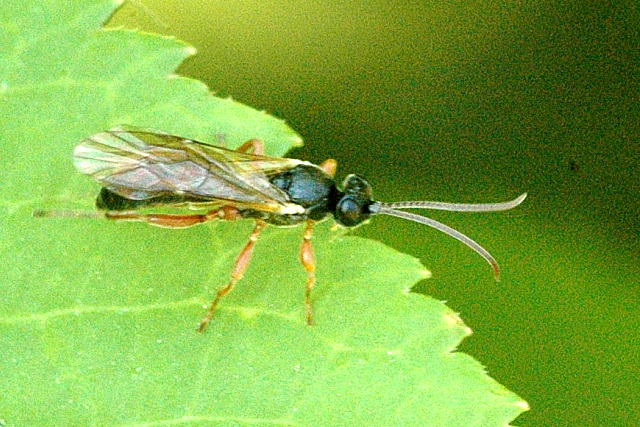

Scientific classification
- Kingdom: Animalia
- Phylum: Arthropoda
- Class: Insecta
- Order: Hymenoptera
- Family: Ichneumonidae
- Genus: Triclistus
- Species: T. pallipes

Binomial name
- Triclistus pallipes Holmgren, 1873

= Triclistus pallipes =

Species of wasp

Triclistus pallipes is a species of ichneumon wasp in the family Ichneumonidae. It is a parasitoid of Epermenia chaerophyllella larvae and Swammerdamia pyrella cocoons
