= Hypsicera =

Scientific classification
- Kingdom: Animalia
- Phylum: Arthropoda
- Class: Insecta
- Order: Hymenoptera
- Family: Ichneumonidae
- Genus: Hypsicera; Latreille, 1829

Genus of wasps

Hypsicera is a genus of parasitoid wasps belonging to the family Ichneumonidae.

The genus has cosmopolitan distribution.

Species:

- Hypsicera affinis Chiu, 1962
- Hypsicera amica (Seyrig, 1934)
- Hypsicera bicolor Momoi & Kusigemati, 1970
- Hypsicera brevicornis Momoi & Kusigemati, 1970
- Hypsicera carinata Momoi & Kusigemati, 1970
- Hypsicera curvator (Fabricus, 1793)
- Hypsicera femoralis (Geoffroy, 1785)
- Hypsicera harrelli Momoi & Kusigemati, 1970
- Hypsicera incarinata Momoi & Kusigemati, 1970
- Hypsicera intermedia Momoi & Kusigemati, 1970
- Hypsicera makiharai Kusigemati, 1971
- Hypsicera nigribasis Momoi & Kusigemati, 1970
- Hypsicera postfurcalis Kusigemati, 1971
- Hypsicera spiracularis Tolkanitz, 1995
- Hypsicera yoshimotoi Momoi & Kusigemati, 1970
