= Trieces =

Scientific classification
- Kingdom: Animalia
- Phylum: Arthropoda
- Clade: Pancrustacea
- Class: Insecta
- Order: Hymenoptera
- Family: Ichneumonidae
- Genus: Trieces; Townes, 1946

Genus of wasps

Trieces is a genus of parasitoid wasps belonging to the family Ichneumonidae.

The species of this genus are found in Eurasia, Africa and North America.

Species:

- Trieces agilis Tolkanitz, 1986
- Trieces aquilus Townes & Townes, 1959
- Trieces etuokensis
- Trieces facialis (Thomson, 1887)
- Trieces horisme Gauld & Sithole, 2002
- Trieces platysoma Townes, 1946
- Trieces riodinis Gauld & Sithole, 2002
- Trieces tuvule Gauld & Sithole, 2002
- Trieces tyloidalis Mazón & Bordera, 2016
- Trieces wardae Gauld & Sithole, 2002
- Trieces wasnia Gauld & Sithole, 2002
- Trieces zwizarmae Gauld & Sithole, 2002
