= Demmin (district) =

Coordinates: 53°45′N 13°00′E

- District
- Flag Coat of arms

- Country: Germany
- State: Mecklenburg-Vorpommern
- Disbanded: 2011
- Capital: Demmin

Area
  - Total: 1,921 km^{2} (742 sq mi)

Population (2010-12-31)
  - Total: 79,466
  - Density: 41.37/km^{2} (107.1/sq mi)
- Time zone: UTC+01:00 (CET)
  - Summer (DST): UTC+02:00 (CEST)
- Vehicle registration: DM
- Website: lk-demmin.de

Demmin (German pronunciation: [dɛˈmiːn]) is a former Kreis (district) in Mecklenburg-Western Pomerania, Germany. It was bounded by (from the south and clockwise) the districts of Müritz, Güstrow, Nordvorpommern, Ostvorpommern and Mecklenburg-Strelitz.

== History ==
Demmin District was established in 1994 by merging the former districts of Demmin, Altentreptow and Malchin. On 4 September 2011, the bulk of the district was merged to Mecklenburgische Seenplatte, while the northeastern Ämter Peenetal/Loitz and Jarmen-Tutow became part of Vorpommern-Greifswald.

== Coat of arms ==
The coat of arms displays:
- The bull is the heraldic animal of Mecklenburg
- The silver griffin together with the chess pattern have been the arms of Pomerania
- The silver castle to the right is from the arms of the city of Demmin

== Towns and municipalities ==
The subdivisions of the district were (situation August 2011):

Amt-free towns
1. Dargun
2. Demmin

Ämter
1. Demmin-Land [seat: Demmin]; 1. Beggerow; 2. Borrentin; 3. Hohenbollentin; 4. Hohenmocker; 5. Kentzlin; 6. Kletzin; 7. Lindenberg; 8. Meesiger; 9. Nossendorf; 10. Sarow; 11. Schönfeld; 12. Siedenbrünzow; 13. Sommersdorf; 14. Utzedel; 15. Verchen; 16. Warrenzin; 2. Jarmen-Tutow; 1. Alt Tellin; 2. Bentzin; 3. Daberkow; 4. Jarmen^{1, 2}; 5. Kruckow; 6. Tutow; 7. Völschow	3. Malchin am Kummerower See; 1. Basedow; 2. Duckow; 3. Faulenrost; 4. Gielow; 5. Kummerow; 6. Malchin^{1, 2}; 7. Neukalen^{2}; 4. Peenetal/Loitz; 1. Düvier^{3}; 2. Görmin; 3. Loitz^{1, 2}; 4. Sassen-Trantow; 5. Stavenhagen; 1. Bredenfelde; 2. Briggow; 3. Grammentin; 4. Gülzow; 5. Ivenack; 6. Jürgenstorf; 7. Kittendorf; 8. Knorrendorf; 9. Mölln; 10. Ritzerow; 11. Rosenow; 12. Stavenhagen^{1, 2}; 13. Zettemin	6. Treptower Tollensewinkel; 1. Altenhagen; 2. Altentreptow^{1, 2}; 3. Bartow; 4. Breesen; 5. Breest; 6. Burow; 7. Gnevkow; 8. Golchen; 9. Grapzow; 10. Grischow; 11. Groß Teetzleben; 12. Gültz; 13. Kriesow; 14. Pripsleben; 15. Röckwitz; 16. Siedenbollentin; 17. Tützpatz; 18. Werder; 19. Wildberg; 20. Wolde
^{1} - seat of the Amt; ^{2} - town; ^{3} - former town/municipality
