= Otto Piper =

German architectural historian

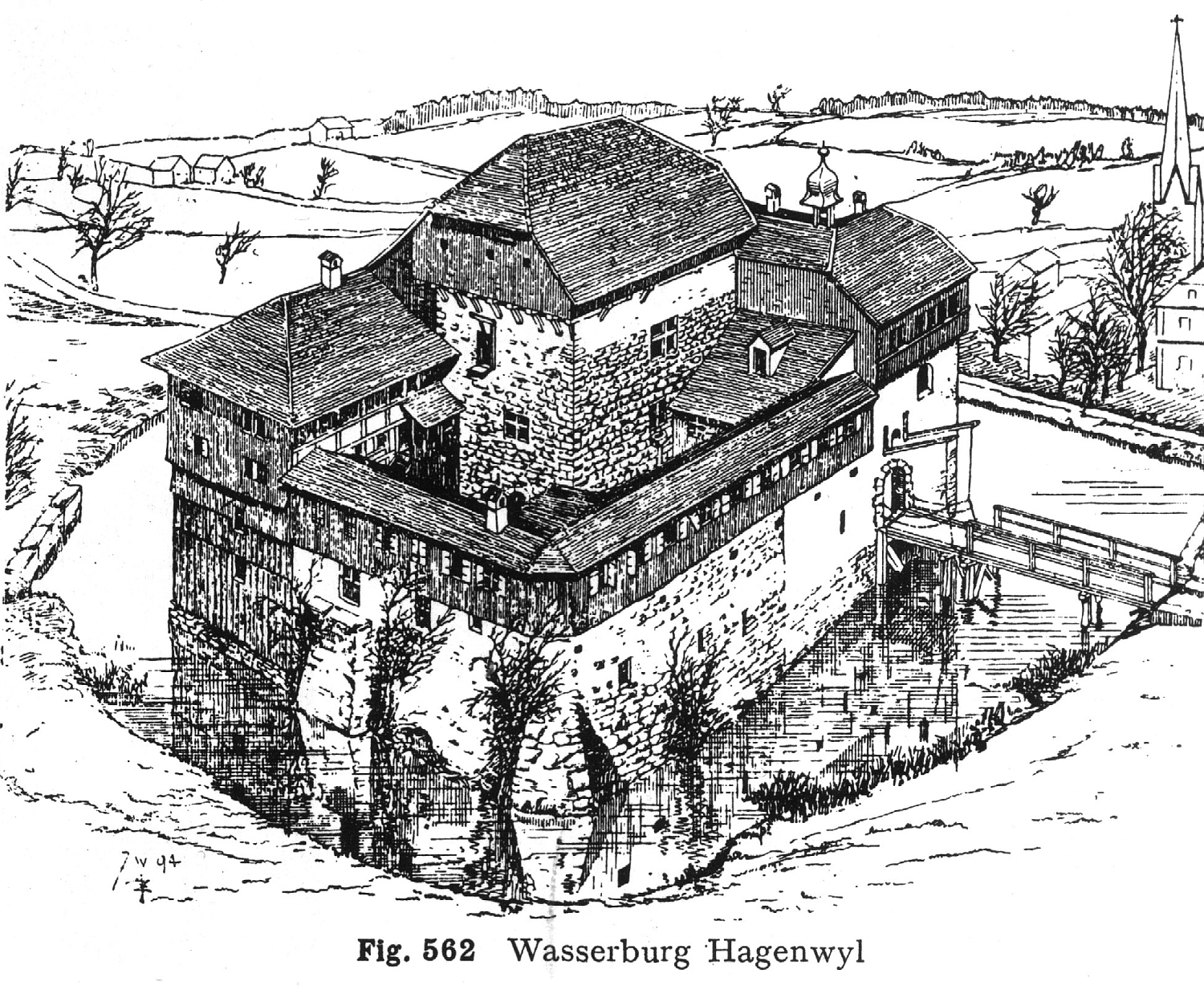
Hagenwil Castle, drawing by Otto Piper

Otto Piper (1841–1921) was a German architectural historian who, with August von Cohausen (1812–1896), is regarded as one of the two founders of scientific research into castles.

== Life ==
Otto Piper was born on 23 December 1841 in Röckwitz, the youngest of five children of the Evangelical pastor, Wilhelm Piper (1806–1873), and his wife, Julie, née Mercker (1818–1888). He was born at Röckwitz near Stavenhagen in Prussia. He attended the grammar school in Neubrandenburg from 1850 to 1862 and passed his Abitur in 1862, coming top of his class. During his time at the school in Neubrandenburg, about which he later wrote as part of his school recollections, he met Fritz Reuter, Johannes Schondorf and other people in Reuter's circle of friends. After studying law at the Ludwig-Maximilians-Universität München, the Friedrich Wilhelm University of Berlin and, from May 1864, the University of Rostock, where he received a doctorate in 1873 (Dr. jur.), Piper initially worked as a lawyer in Rostock. There he came to know Sophie Krüger, the woman who was later to become his wife.

Soon after the end of the Franco-Prussian War, Piper went to Strasbourg in Alsace where he became the editor of the Niederrheinischen Kurier ("Lower Rhine Courier"). Later he was the editor of newspapers in Trier and Düsseldorf, before returning to Mecklenburg in 1879. From 1879 to 1889, he was the mayor of Penzlin. Afterwards he settled in Konstanz on Lake Constance and, in 1893, moved to Munich.

His main work, Burgenkunde ("Castle Architecture" 1895) is still one of the standard works on German castle research, a discipline known generally in German as Burgenkunde after his book. His great rival was Bodo Ebhardt, the other well known German castle researcher at the turn of the century. Piper accused Ebhardt, for example, of opportunism, when he rebuilt the Kaiser's Château du Haut-Kœnigsbourg in Alsace in 1902 and, contrary to his own scientific findings, made several unhistoric changes in order to satisfy the taste of his imperial client.

Otto Piper had three children, including the publisher, Reinhard Piper. He died on 23 February 1921 in Munich.

== Honours ==
- 1911 honorary doctors of the University of Rostock
- 1911 Silver Medal for Art and Science (Mecklenburg-Schwerin)

== Works ==
- Get Rekt der Sponsalien besonders nach dem Particularrechte der Stadt Rostock: ein Commentar zu Thl. I., Tit. IV. des Rostocker Stadtrechtes v. J. 1757. Rostock: Stiller 1871
- Zu den commissarisch-deputatischen Verhandlungen über die Reform unserer Verfassung: eine staatswissenschaftliche Denkschrift. Rostock: Stiller 1872
- Zur Baugeschichte der Burg Stargard i.M. In: Verein für Mecklenburgische Geschichte und Altertumskunde (publ.): Jahrbücher des Vereins für Mecklenburgische Geschichte und Altertumskunde. Vol. 51, Schwerin, 1886, pp. 98-102 (digitalised)
- Über die Burgreste im Vereinsgebiet, besonders die Ruine Altbodman, in: Schriften des Vereins für Geschichte des Bodensees und seiner Umgebung, 20th annual, 1891, pp. 31–43 (digitalised)
- Nochmal die Lindauer Heidenmauer, in: Schriften des Vereins für Geschichte des Bodensees und seiner Umgebung, 21st annual, 1892, pp. 87–105 (digitalised); Berichtigungen, pp. 106–110 (digitalised)
- Burgenkunde. Forschungen über gesamtes Bauwesen und Geschichte der Burgen innerhalb des deutschen Sprachgebietes. Theodor Ackermann, Munich, 1895
- Von der glücklichen mecklenburgischen Verfassung. 1898
- Abriss der Burgenkunde. Leipzig, 1900
- Österreichische Burgen. (publ. Alfred Hölder) Vienna: Erster Theil 1902 (Digitalisat), Zweiter Teil 1903 (digitalised), Dritter Teil 1904 (digitalised), Vierter Teil 1905 (digitalised), Fünfter Teil 1907 (digitalised), Sechster Teil 1908 (digitalised), Siebenter Teil 1909 (digitalised), Achter Teil 1910 (digitalised)
- Burgenkunde. Bauwesen und Geschichte der Burgen. Munich, 1912 (1st edn., 1895). ISBN 3-8035-8316-0 (reprint e.g. in Weltbild-Buchverlag, Munich, 1992, ISBN 3-89350-554-7)

== Literature ==
- Reinhard Piper: "Otto Piper. Zu seinem 10. Todestag am 23. Februar 1923", in: Mecklenburgische Monatshefte, 7th annual, 1931, pp. 67–70.
- Piper, Otto. In: Grete Grewolls: Wer war wer in Mecklenburg-Vorpommern? Ein Personenlexikon. Edition Temmen, Bremen, 1995, ISBN 3-86108-282-9, p. 332.
- Grewolls, Grete (2011). Wer war wer in Mecklenburg und Vorpommern. Das Personenlexikon (in German). Rostock: Hinstorff Verlag. p. 7610. ISBN 978-3-356-01301-6. (with portrait photograph)
- Sabine Bock: Piper, Otto Karl Christoph Heinrich, Pseudonym: P. Sincerus, in: Biographisches Lexikon für Mecklenburg, Vol. 7. Schmidt-Römhild, Rostock, 2013, ISBN 978-3-7950-3752-9, pp. 243–244.
