= Nietingsee =

Lake in Mecklenburg-Vorpommern, Germany

- Location within Mecklenburg-Vorpommern
- Location: Mecklenburgische Seenplatte, Mecklenburg-Vorpommern
- Coordinates: 53°26′55.8″N 12°49′59.7″E
- Primary inflows: From Mühlensee (Mill Lake), through fen
- Primary outflows: ditch to Hofsee
- Basin countries: Germany
- Surface area: 0.0085 km^{2} (0.0033 sq mi)
- Surface elevation: 65 m (213 ft)

Nietingsee (Nieting Lake) is a lake in Müritz rural district, Mecklenburg-Vorpommern, Germany. It is located in the middle of the Müritz National Park, in the area of Kargow municipality, north of the hamlet of Speck. At an elevation of 65 m, its surface area is 0.0085 km^{2}. The almost perfectly circular lake has a diameter of 100 metres. It is located in a shallow depression in the terminal moraine that crossed the national park. The depression was covered with fen, until a mill run drained the area and the ground water table fell so low that the fen dried out and natural succession in form of forest began to take over. After a decision was made to re-flood the depression, the mill run was closed in 1993, the forest then began to retreat and the fens surrounding the Nietingsee to redevelop. A circular linking trail passes close to the lake on its way to Speck.
