= Mecklenburgische Seenplatte (district) =

District in North-Eastern Germany

Coordinates: 53°30′N 13°05′E

- District
- Flag Coat of arms
- Country: Germany
- State: Mecklenburg-Western Pomerania
- Capital: Neubrandenburg

Government
  - District admin.: Heiko Kärger (CDU)

Area
  - Total: 5,468 km^{2} (2,111 sq mi)

Population (31 December 2023)
  - Total: 247,575
  - Density: 45/km^{2} (120/sq mi)
- Time zone: UTC+01:00 (CET)
  - Summer (DST): UTC+02:00 (CEST)
- Vehicle registration: MSE, AT, DM, MC, MST, MÜR, NZ, RM, WRN; Neubrandenburg: NB
- Website: lk-mecklenburgische-seenplatte.de

Mecklenburgische Seenplatte (German pronunciation: [ˈmeːklənˌbuʁɡɪʃə ˈzeːənˌplatə], lit. 'Mecklenburg Lake Plateau') is a district in the southeast of Mecklenburg-Vorpommern, Germany. It is bounded by (from the west and clockwise) the districts Ludwigslust-Parchim, Rostock (district), Vorpommern-Rügen, Vorpommern-Greifswald, and the state Brandenburg to the south. The district covers the largest area of all German districts and more than double the area of the state of Saarland. The district seat is the town Neubrandenburg.

== History ==
Mecklenburgische Seenplatte District was established by merging the former districts of Müritz, Mecklenburg-Strelitz and most of Demmin (except the Ämter Jarmen-Tutow and Peenetal/Loitz), along with the former district-free town of Neubrandenburg as part of the local government reform of September 2011. The name of the district was decided by referendum on 4 September 2011.

In 2012, a new coat of arms was proposed for Mecklenburgische Seenplatte District. It was rejected because one element used in the right part, which involved an eagle catching a fish, resembled a symbol used by the far-right neopagan group Artgemeinschaft.

== Geographic features ==
There are a number of lakes within the boundaries of Mecklenburgische Seenplatte district, including:

- Lake Kummerow
- Kölpinsee
- Fleesensee
- Nietingsee

== Towns and municipalities ==
Amt-free towns
1. Dargun
2. Demmin
3. Neubrandenburg
4. Neustrelitz
5. Waren (Müritz)
Amt-free municipalities
1. Feldberger Seenlandschaft

Ämter
1. Demmin-Land; [seat: Demmin]: 1. Beggerow; 2. Borrentin; 3. Hohenbollentin; 4. Hohenmocker; 5. Kentzlin; 6. Kletzin; 7. Lindenberg; 8. Meesiger; 9. Nossendorf; 10. Sarow; 11. Schönfeld; 12. Siedenbrünzow; 13. Sommersdorf; 14. Utzedel; 15. Verchen; 16. Warrenzin; 2. Friedland; 1. Datzetal; 2. Friedland^{1, 2}; 3. Galenbeck; 3. Malchin am Kummerower See; 1. Basedow; 2. Faulenrost; 3. Gielow; 4. Kummerow; 5. Malchin^{1, 2}; 6. Neukalen^{2}; 4. Malchow; 1. Alt Schwerin; 2. Fünfseen; 3. Göhren-Lebbin; 4. Malchow^{1, 2}; 5. Nossentiner Hütte; 6. Silz; 7. Walow; 8. Zislow	5. Mecklenburgische; Kleinseenplatte; 1. Mirow^{1, 2}; 2. Priepert; 3. Wesenberg^{2}; 4. Wustrow; 6. Neustrelitz-Land; (seat: Neustrelitz): 1. Blankensee; 2. Blumenholz; 3. Carpin; 4. Godendorf; 5. Grünow; 6. Hohenzieritz; 7. Klein Vielen; 8. Kratzeburg; 9. Möllenbeck; 10. Userin; 11. Wokuhl-Dabelow; 7. Neverin; 1. Beseritz; 2. Blankenhof; 3. Brunn; 4. Neddemin; 5. Neuenkirchen; 6. Neverin^{1}; 7. Sponholz; 8. Staven; 9. Trollenhagen; 10. Woggersin; 11. Wulkenzin; 12. Zirzow; 8. Penzliner Land; 1. Ankershagen; 2. Kuckssee; 3. Möllenhagen; 4. Penzlin^{1, 2}	9. Röbel-Müritz; 1. Altenhof; 2. Bollewick; 3. Buchholz; 4. Bütow; 5. Eldetal; 6. Fincken; 7. Gotthun; 8. Groß Kelle; 9. Kieve; 10. Lärz; 11. Leizen; 12. Melz; 13. Priborn; 14. Rechlin; 15. Röbel^{1, 2}; 16. Schwarz; 17. Sietow; 18. Stuer; 19. Südmüritz; 10. Seenlandschaft Waren; [seat: Waren]: 1. Grabowhöfe; 2. Groß Plasten; 3. Hohen Wangelin; 4. Jabel; 5. Kargow; 6. Klink; 7. Klocksin; 8. Moltzow; 9. Peenehagen; 10. Schloen-Dratow; 11. Torgelow am See; 12. Vollrathsruhe; 11. Stargarder Land; 1. Burg Stargard^{1, 2}; 2. Cölpin; 3. Groß Nemerow; 4. Holldorf; 5. Lindetal; 6. Pragsdorf	12. Stavenhagen; 1. Bredenfelde; 2. Briggow; 3. Grammentin; 4. Gülzow; 5. Ivenack; 6. Jürgenstorf; 7. Kittendorf; 8. Knorrendorf; 9. Mölln; 10. Ritzerow; 11. Rosenow; 12. Stavenhagen^{1, 2}; 13. Zettemin; 13. Treptower Tollensewinkel; 1. Altenhagen; 2. Altentreptow^{1, 2}; 3. Bartow; 4. Breesen; 5. Burow; 6. Gnevkow; 7. Golchen; 8. Grapzow; 9. Grischow; 10. Groß Teetzleben; 11. Gültz; 12. Kriesow; 13. Pripsleben; 14. Röckwitz; 15. Siedenbollentin; 16. Tützpatz; 17. Werder; 18. Wildberg; 19. Wolde; 14. Woldegk; 1. Groß Miltzow; 2. Kublank; 3. Neetzka; 4. Schönbeck; 5. Schönhausen; 6. Voigtsdorf; 7. Woldegk^{1, 2}
^{1}- seat of the Amt; ^{2} - town
