= Schönfeld, Mecklenburg-Vorpommern =

Schönfeld
- Municipality
- Location of Schönfeld within Mecklenburgische Seenplatte district
- Interactive map of Schönfeld
- Location within Germany Location within Mecklenburg-Vorpommern
- Coordinates: 53°51′N 12°58′E
- Country: Germany
- State: Mecklenburg-Vorpommern
- District: Mecklenburgische Seenplatte
- Municipal assoc.: Demmin-Land
- Subdivisions: 3

Government
  - Mayor: Karin Peisker

Area
  - Total: 16.03 km^{2} (6.19 sq mi)
- Elevation: 33 m (108 ft)

Population (2025-12-31)
  - Total: 342
  - Density: 21.3/km^{2} (55.3/sq mi)
- Time zone: UTC+01:00 (CET)
  - Summer (DST): UTC+02:00 (CEST)
- Postal codes: 17111
- Dialling codes: 039994
- Vehicle registration: DM
- Website: www.amt-demmin-land.de

Schönfeld is a municipality in the Mecklenburgische Seenplatte district, in Mecklenburg-Vorpommern, Germany.
