= Faulenrost =

- Municipality
- Location of Faulenrost within Mecklenburgische Seenplatte district
- Interactive map of Faulenrost
- Location within Germany Location within Mecklenburg-Vorpommern
- Coordinates: 53°38′N 12°47′E
- Country: Germany
- State: Mecklenburg-Vorpommern
- District: Mecklenburgische Seenplatte
- Municipal assoc.: Malchin am Kummerower See
- Subdivisions: 4

Government
  - Mayor: Helma Franken

Area
  - Total: 33.75 km^{2} (13.03 sq mi)
- Elevation: 39 m (128 ft)

Population (2025-12-31)
  - Total: 630
  - Density: 19/km^{2} (48/sq mi)
- Time zone: UTC+01:00 (CET)
  - Summer (DST): UTC+02:00 (CEST)
- Postal codes: 17139
- Dialling codes: 039951
- Vehicle registration: DM

Faulenrost is a municipality in the Mecklenburgische Seenplatte district, in Mecklenburg-Vorpommern, north-east Germany.
