= Gültz =

- Municipality
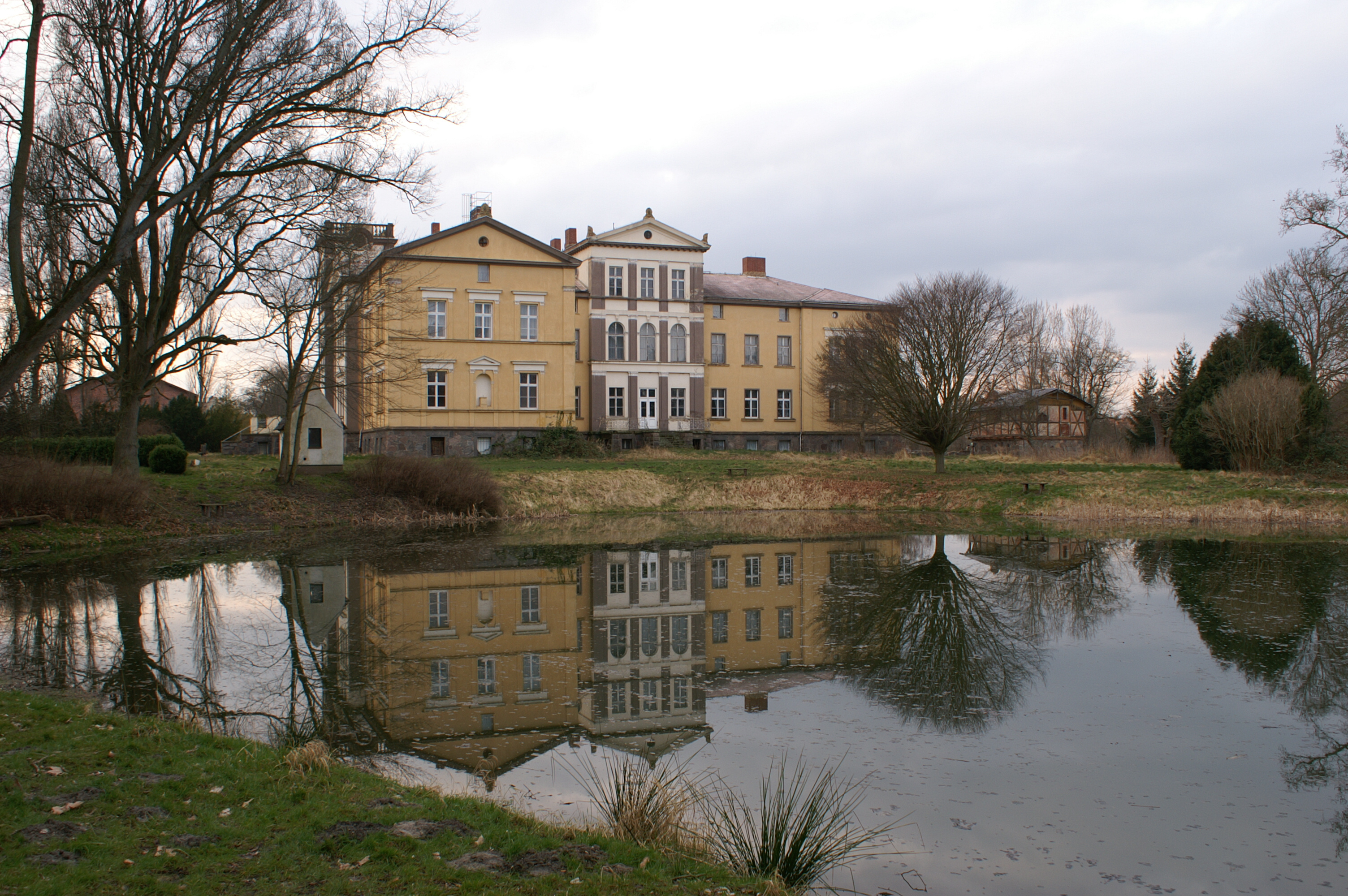
- Schloss Gültz in Gültz

- Location of Gültz within Mecklenburgische Seenplatte district
- Interactive map of Gültz
- Location within Germany Location within Mecklenburg-Vorpommern
- Coordinates: 53°45′N 13°11′E
- Country: Germany
- State: Mecklenburg-Vorpommern
- District: Mecklenburgische Seenplatte
- Municipal assoc.: Treptower Tollensewinkel
- Subdivisions: 3

Government
  - Mayor: Gerhard Bolinski

Area
  - Total: 23.70 km^{2} (9.15 sq mi)
- Elevation: 14 m (46 ft)

Population (2025-12-31)
  - Total: 486
  - Density: 20.5/km^{2} (53.1/sq mi)
- Time zone: UTC+01:00 (CET)
  - Summer (DST): UTC+02:00 (CEST)
- Postal codes: 17089
- Dialling codes: 03965
- Vehicle registration: DM
- Website: www.altentreptow.de

Gültz is a municipality in the Mecklenburgische Seenplatte district, in Mecklenburg-Vorpommern, Germany.

== People ==
- Helmuth von Maltzahn (1840-1923), German real estate owner, lawyer, German fincance minister and cavalary officer
