= Grischow =

- Municipality
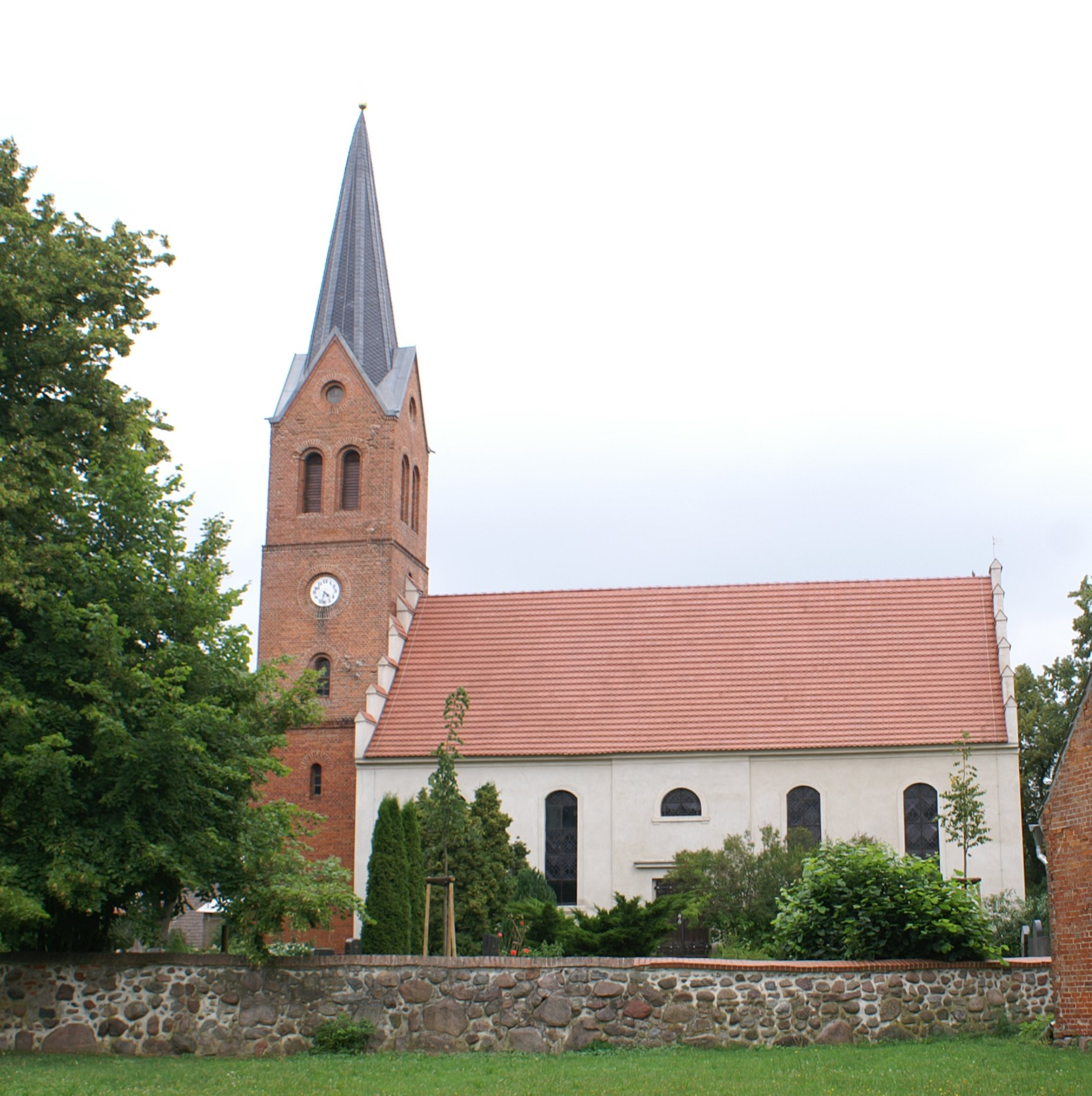
- Church in Grischow

- Location of Grischow within Mecklenburgische Seenplatte district
- Interactive map of Grischow
- Location within Germany Location within Mecklenburg-Vorpommern
- Coordinates: 53°42′N 13°21′E
- Country: Germany
- State: Mecklenburg-Vorpommern
- District: Mecklenburgische Seenplatte
- Municipal assoc.: Treptower Tollensewinkel

Government
  - Mayor: Peter Driemecker

Area
  - Total: 10.94 km^{2} (4.22 sq mi)
- Elevation: 17 m (56 ft)

Population (2025-12-31)
  - Total: 236
  - Density: 21.6/km^{2} (55.9/sq mi)
- Time zone: UTC+01:00 (CET)
  - Summer (DST): UTC+02:00 (CEST)
- Postal codes: 17089
- Dialling codes: 03969
- Vehicle registration: DM
- Website: www.altentreptow.de

Grischow is a municipality in the Mecklenburgische Seenplatte district, in Mecklenburg-Vorpommern, Germany.
