= Wildberg, Mecklenburg-Vorpommern =

Wildberg
- Municipality
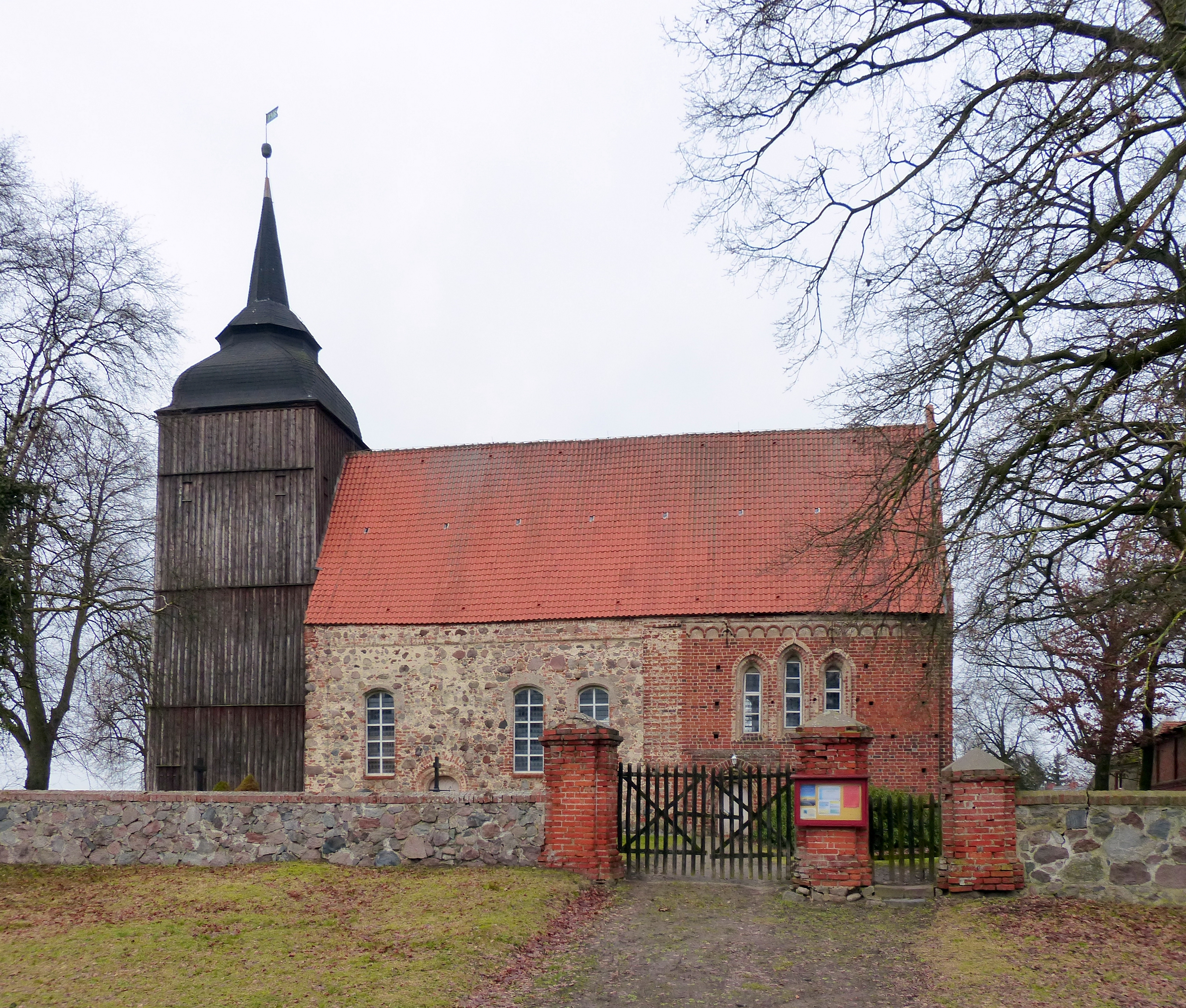
- Wildberg Church

- Location of Wildberg within Mecklenburgische Seenplatte district
- Interactive map of Wildberg
- Location within Germany Location within Mecklenburg-Vorpommern
- Coordinates: 53°39′N 13°07′E
- Country: Germany
- State: Mecklenburg-Vorpommern
- District: Mecklenburgische Seenplatte
- Municipal assoc.: Treptower Tollensewinkel
- Subdivisions: 4

Government
  - Mayor: Beatrix Papke

Area
  - Total: 22.57 km^{2} (8.71 sq mi)
- Elevation: 50 m (160 ft)

Population (2025-12-31)
  - Total: 456
  - Density: 20.2/km^{2} (52.3/sq mi)
- Time zone: UTC+01:00 (CET)
  - Summer (DST): UTC+02:00 (CEST)
- Postal codes: 17091
- Dialling codes: 039604
- Vehicle registration: DM
- Website: www.altentreptow.de

Wildberg (German pronunciation: [ˈvɪltbɛʁk]) is a municipality in the Mecklenburgische Seenplatte district, in Mecklenburg-Vorpommern, Germany.
