= Kriesow =

- Municipality
- Location of Kriesow within Mecklenburgische Seenplatte district
- Interactive map of Kriesow
- Location within Germany Location within Mecklenburg-Vorpommern
- Coordinates: 53°44′N 13°03′E
- Country: Germany
- State: Mecklenburg-Vorpommern
- District: Mecklenburgische Seenplatte
- Municipal assoc.: Treptower Tollensewinkel
- Subdivisions: 4

Government
  - Mayor: Curt Sczesny

Area
  - Total: 20.09 km^{2} (7.76 sq mi)
- Elevation: 91 m (299 ft)

Population (2025-12-31)
  - Total: 284
  - Density: 14.1/km^{2} (36.6/sq mi)
- Time zone: UTC+01:00 (CET)
  - Summer (DST): UTC+02:00 (CEST)
- Postal codes: 17091
- Dialling codes: 039600
- Vehicle registration: DM
- Website: www.altentreptow.de

Kriesow is a municipality in the Mecklenburgische Seenplatte district, in Mecklenburg-Vorpommern, Germany.
