= Tützpatz =

- Municipality
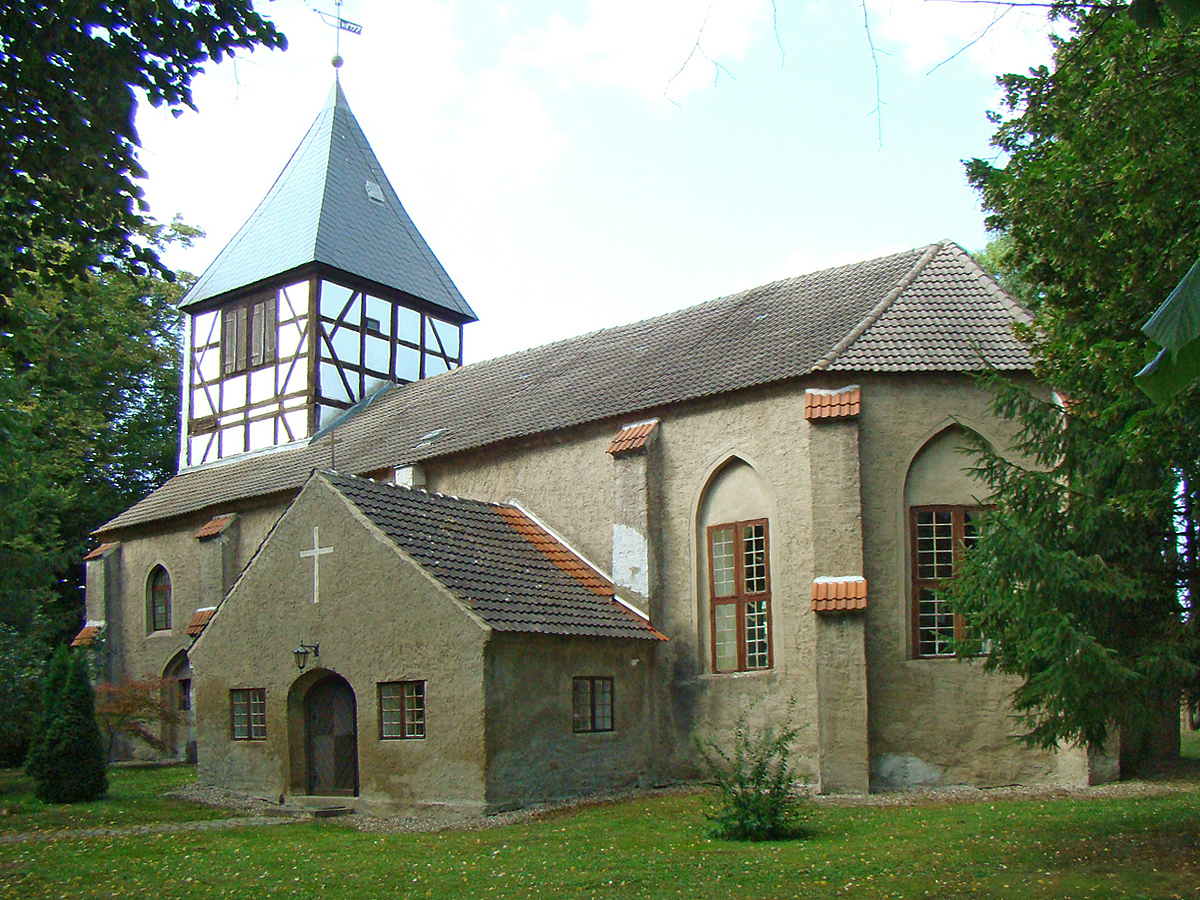
- Tützpatz Church

- Location of Tützpatz within Mecklenburgische Seenplatte district
- Interactive map of Tützpatz
- Location within Germany Location within Mecklenburg-Vorpommern
- Coordinates: 53°44′N 13°09′E
- Country: Germany
- State: Mecklenburg-Vorpommern
- District: Mecklenburgische Seenplatte
- Municipal assoc.: Treptower Tollensewinkel
- Subdivisions: 3

Government
  - Mayor: Bruno Haase

Area
  - Total: 21.60 km^{2} (8.34 sq mi)
- Elevation: 59 m (194 ft)

Population (2025-12-31)
  - Total: 533
  - Density: 24.7/km^{2} (63.9/sq mi)
- Time zone: UTC+01:00 (CET)
  - Summer (DST): UTC+02:00 (CEST)
- Postal codes: 17091
- Dialling codes: 039600
- Vehicle registration: DM
- Website: www.altentreptow.de

Tützpatz is a municipality in the Mecklenburgische Seenplatte district, in Mecklenburg-Vorpommern, Germany.
