= Mölln, Mecklenburg-Vorpommern =

Mölln
- Municipality
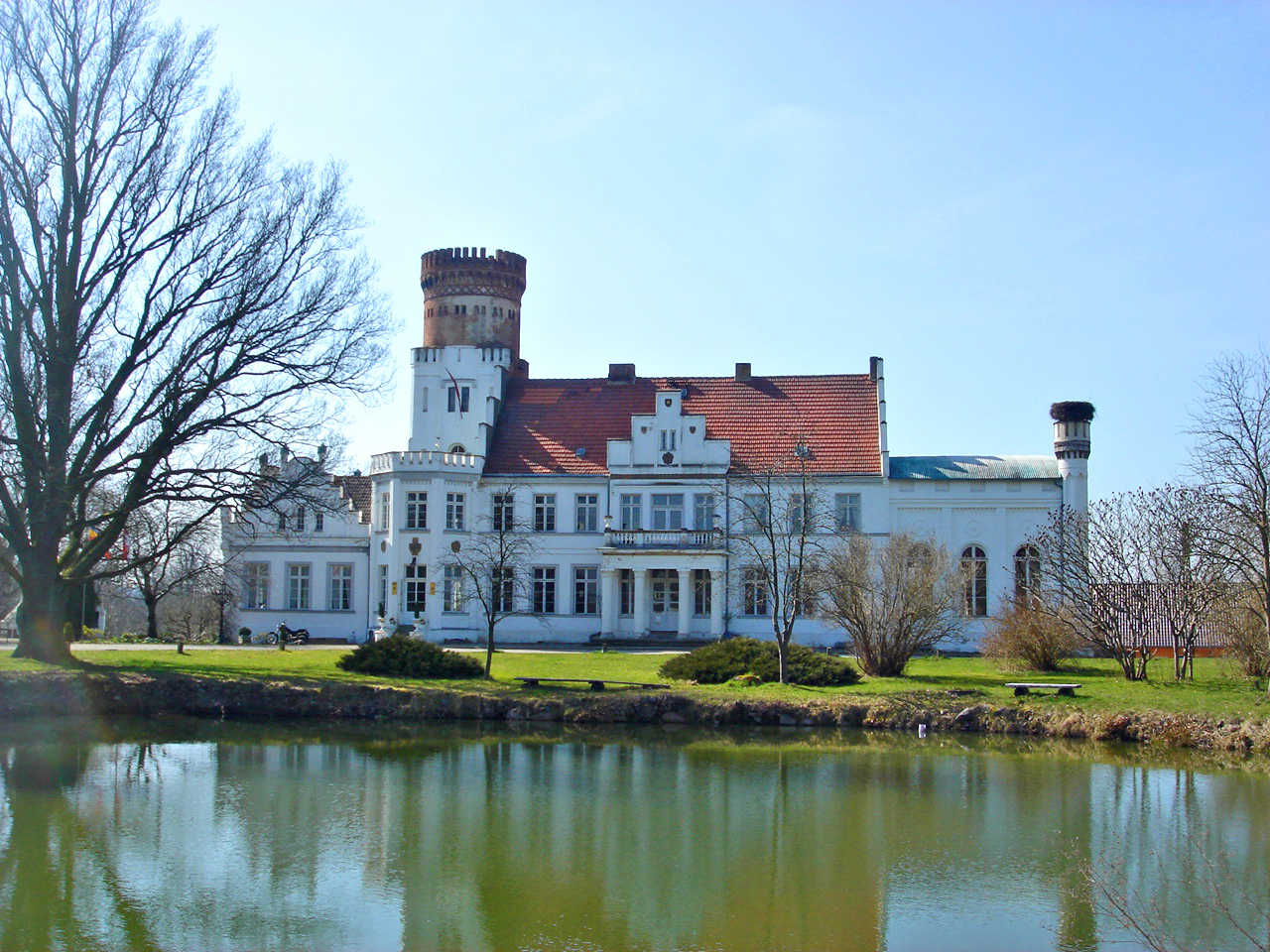
- Wrodow Castle in Mölln

- Location of Mölln within Mecklenburgische Seenplatte district
- Interactive map of Mölln
- Location within Germany Location within Mecklenburg-Vorpommern
- Coordinates: 53°36′N 13°05′E
- Country: Germany
- State: Mecklenburg-Vorpommern
- District: Mecklenburgische Seenplatte
- Municipal assoc.: Stavenhagen
- Subdivisions: 6

Government
  - Mayor: Gabriele Möller

Area
  - Total: 29.73 km^{2} (11.48 sq mi)
- Elevation: 42 m (138 ft)

Population (2025-12-31)
  - Total: 506
  - Density: 17.0/km^{2} (44.1/sq mi)
- Time zone: UTC+01:00 (CET)
  - Summer (DST): UTC+02:00 (CEST)
- Postal codes: 17091
- Dialling codes: 039602
- Vehicle registration: DM
- Website: www.stavenhagen.de

Mölln (German pronunciation: [mœln]) is a municipality in the Mecklenburgische Seenplatte district, in Mecklenburg-Vorpommern, Germany. The first written mention of the village was in 1316. On January 1, 1951, the previously independent communities were merged and now Mölln includes former municipalities of Buchholz, Groß Helle, Klein Helle, Lüdershof and Wrodow.

The Schloss Wrodow (Wrodow castle) is a major landmark of the Mölln municipality. Today it is used as an art gallery and a hotel.
