= Breesen =

- Municipality
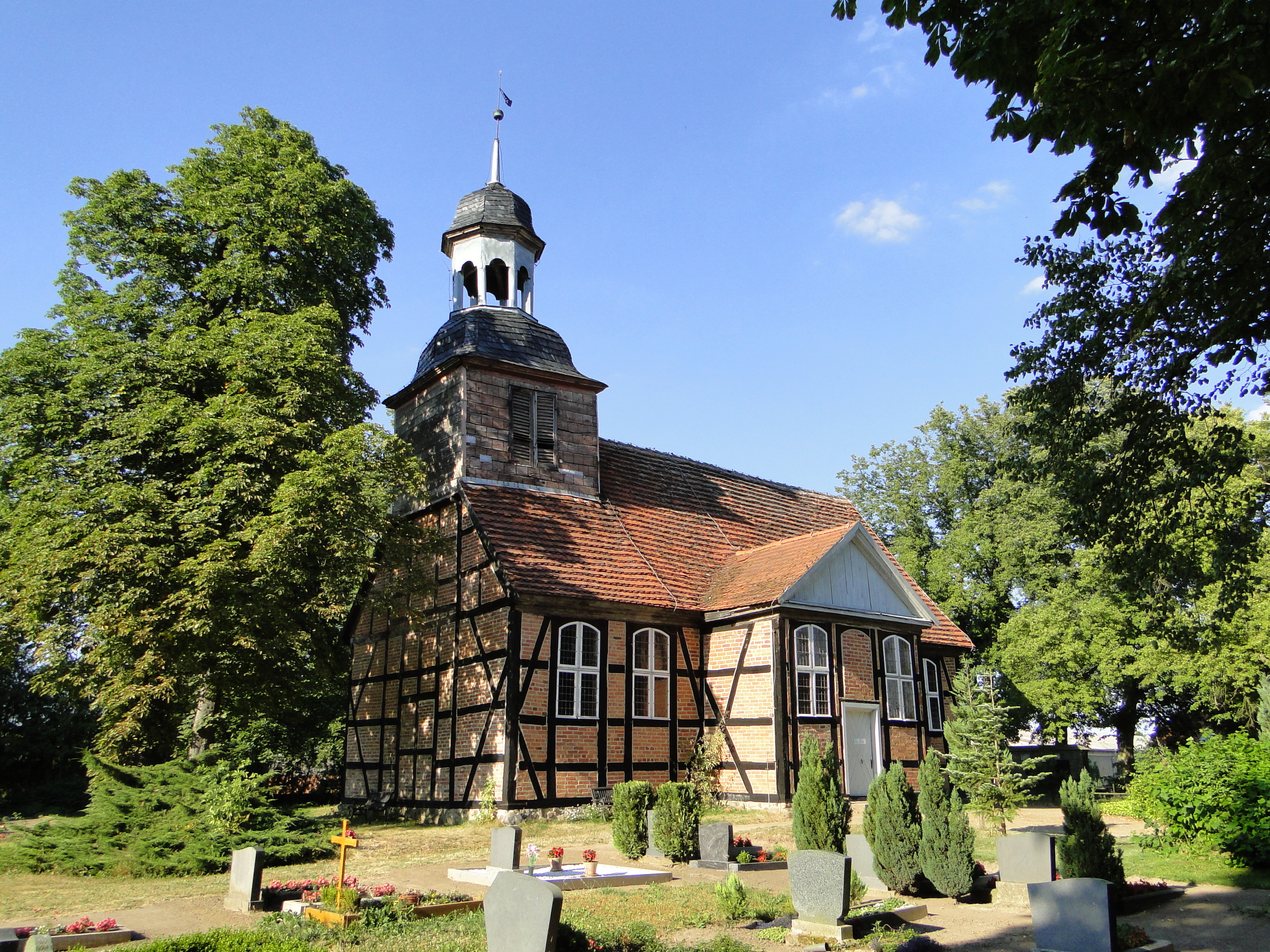
- Church in Breesen

- Location of Breesen within Mecklenburgische Seenplatte district
- Interactive map of Breesen
- Location within Germany Location within Mecklenburg-Vorpommern
- Coordinates: 53°38′N 13°10′E
- Country: Germany
- State: Mecklenburg-Vorpommern
- District: Mecklenburgische Seenplatte
- Municipal assoc.: Treptower Tollensewinkel
- Subdivisions: 3

Government
  - Mayor: Klaus Noack

Area
  - Total: 24.57 km^{2} (9.49 sq mi)
- Elevation: 54 m (177 ft)

Population (2025-12-31)
  - Total: 475
  - Density: 19.3/km^{2} (50.1/sq mi)
- Time zone: UTC+01:00 (CET)
  - Summer (DST): UTC+02:00 (CEST)
- Postal codes: 17091
- Dialling codes: 039604
- Vehicle registration: DM
- Website: www.altentreptow.de

Breesen is a municipality in the Mecklenburgische Seenplatte district, in Mecklenburg-Vorpommern, Germany.
