= Siedenbollentin =

- Municipality
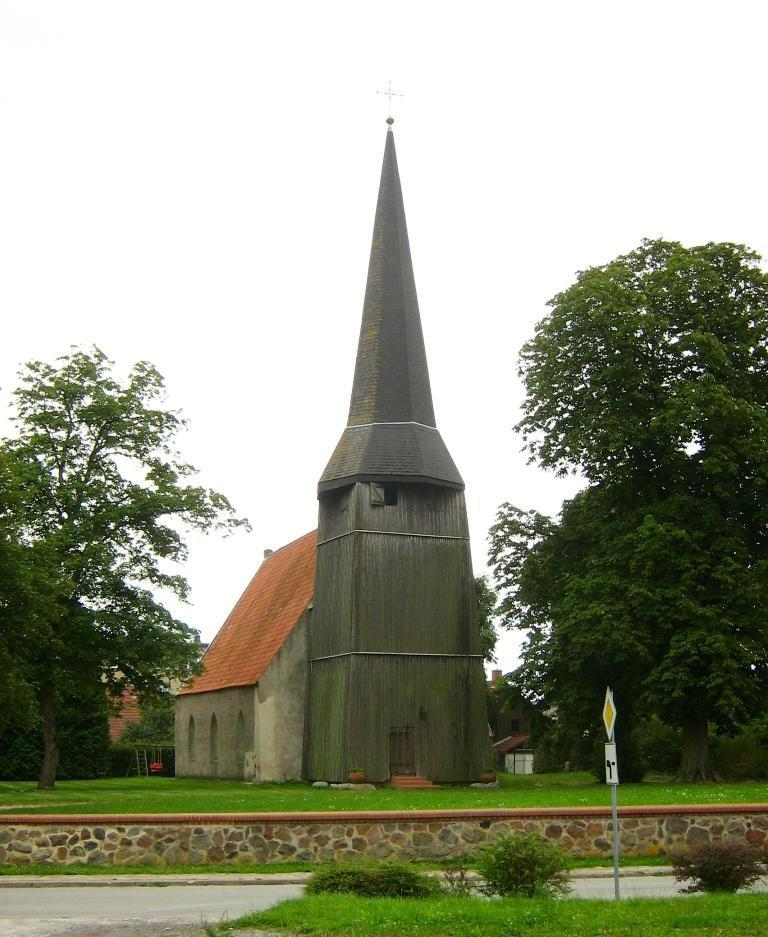
- Siedenbollentin Church

- Location of Siedenbollentin within Mecklenburgische Seenplatte district
- Interactive map of Siedenbollentin
- Location within Germany Location within Mecklenburg-Vorpommern
- Coordinates: 53°44′N 13°23′E
- Country: Germany
- State: Mecklenburg-Vorpommern
- District: Mecklenburgische Seenplatte
- Municipal assoc.: Treptower Tollensewinkel

Government
  - Mayor: torsten haker

Area
  - Total: 18.84 km^{2} (7.27 sq mi)
- Elevation: 71 m (233 ft)

Population (2025-12-31)
  - Total: 513
  - Density: 27.2/km^{2} (70.5/sq mi)
- Time zone: UTC+01:00 (CET)
  - Summer (DST): UTC+02:00 (CEST)
- Postal codes: 17089
- Dialling codes: 03969
- Vehicle registration: DM
- Website: www.altentreptow.de

Siedenbollentin is a municipality in the Mecklenburgische Seenplatte district, in Mecklenburg-Vorpommern, Germany.
