= Gülzow, Mecklenburg-Vorpommern =

Gülzow
- Municipality
- Location of Gülzow within Mecklenburgische Seenplatte district
- Interactive map of Gülzow
- Location within Germany Location within Mecklenburg-Vorpommern
- Coordinates: 53°42′N 12°51′E
- Country: Germany
- State: Mecklenburg-Vorpommern
- District: Mecklenburgische Seenplatte
- Municipal assoc.: Stavenhagen

Government
  - Mayor: Uwe Bürth

Area
  - Total: 12.00 km^{2} (4.63 sq mi)
- Elevation: 63 m (207 ft)

Population (2025-12-31)
  - Total: 403
  - Density: 33.6/km^{2} (87.0/sq mi)
- Time zone: UTC+01:00 (CET)
  - Summer (DST): UTC+02:00 (CEST)
- Postal codes: 17153
- Dialling codes: 039954
- Vehicle registration: DM
- Website: www.stavenhagen.de

Gülzow is a municipality in the Mecklenburgische Seenplatte district, in Mecklenburg-Vorpommern, Germany.
