= Pripsleben =

German municipality in Mecklenburg-Vorpommern, Mecklenburgische Seenplatte district

- Municipality
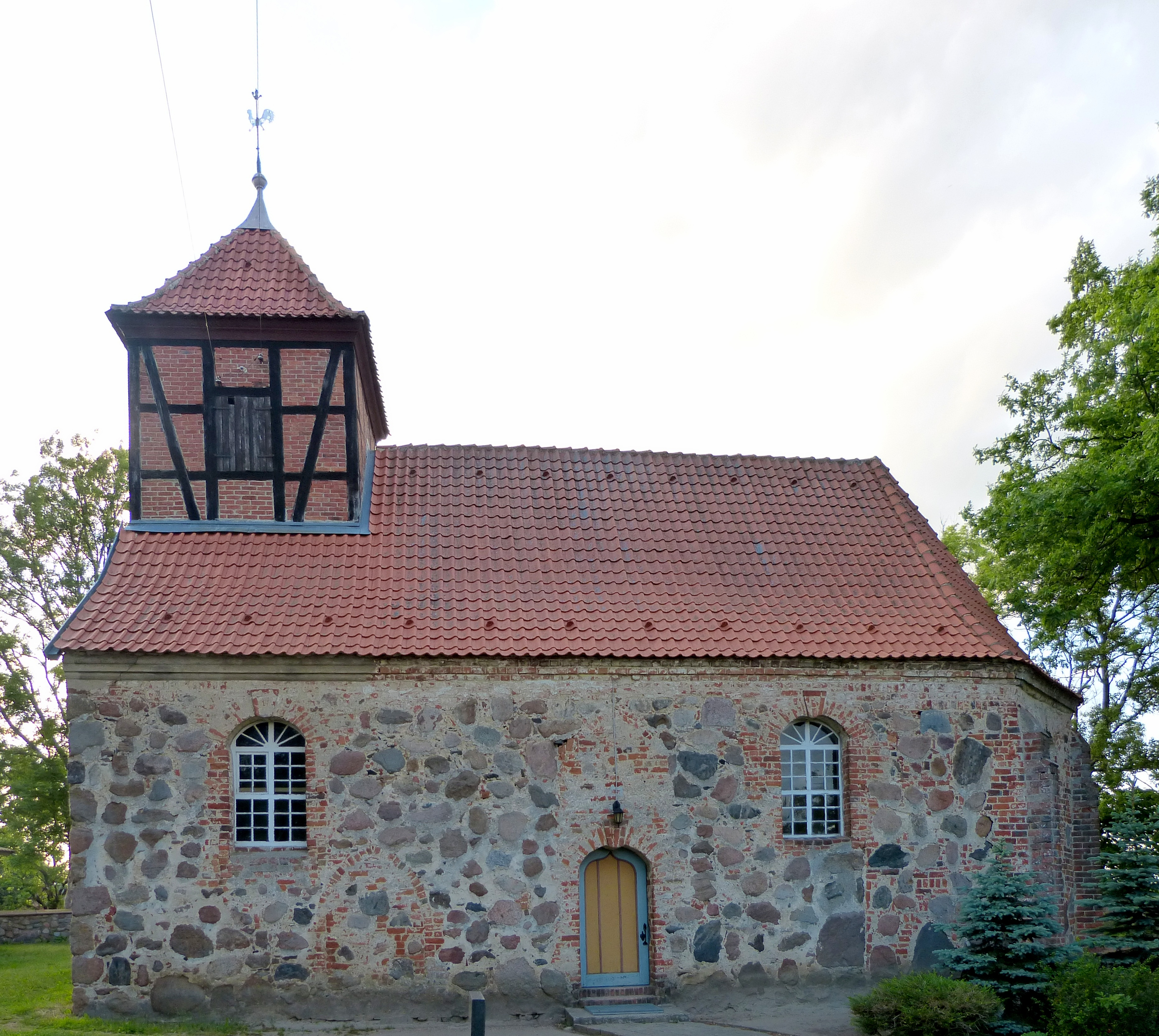
- Village church in Pripsleben

- Location of Pripsleben within Mecklenburgische Seenplatte district
- Interactive map of Pripsleben
- Location within Germany Location within Mecklenburg-Vorpommern
- Coordinates: 53°43′N 13°11′E
- Country: Germany
- State: Mecklenburg-Vorpommern
- District: Mecklenburgische Seenplatte
- Municipal assoc.: Treptower Tollensewinkel
- Subdivisions: 4

Government
  - Mayor: Alfred Zadow

Area
  - Total: 10.03 km^{2} (3.87 sq mi)
- Elevation: 50 m (160 ft)

Population (2025-12-31)
  - Total: 215
  - Density: 21.4/km^{2} (55.5/sq mi)
- Time zone: UTC+01:00 (CET)
  - Summer (DST): UTC+02:00 (CEST)
- Postal codes: 17091
- Dialling codes: 03961
- Vehicle registration: DM
- Website: www.altentreptow.de

Pripsleben is a municipality in the Mecklenburgische Seenplatte district, in Mecklenburg-Vorpommern, Germany.
