= Grapzow =

- Municipality
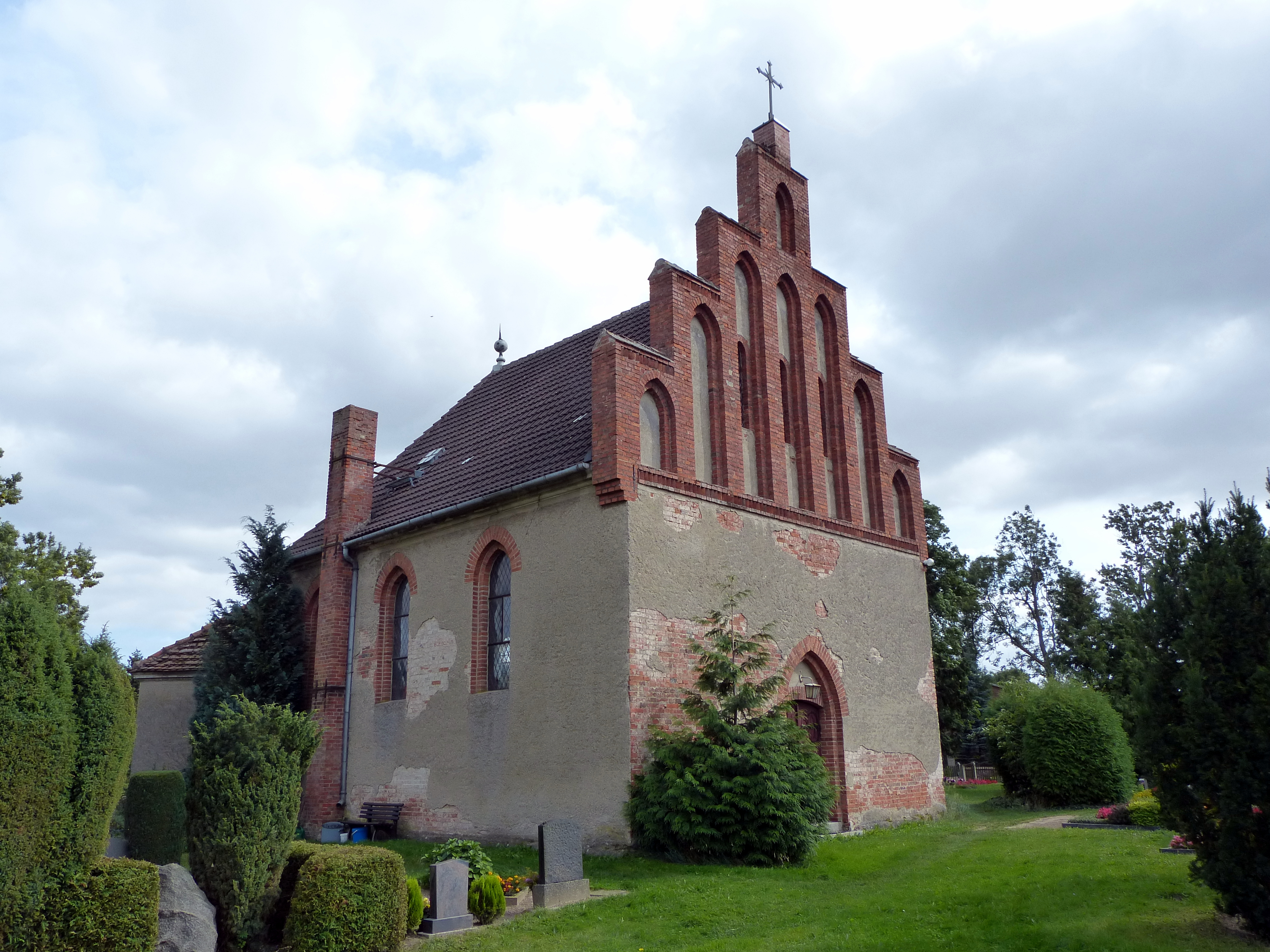
- Church in Grapzow

- Location of Grapzow within Mecklenburgische Seenplatte district
- Interactive map of Grapzow
- Location within Germany Location within Mecklenburg-Vorpommern
- Coordinates: 53°42′N 13°18′E
- Country: Germany
- State: Mecklenburg-Vorpommern
- District: Mecklenburgische Seenplatte
- Municipal assoc.: Treptower Tollensewinkel

Government
  - Mayor: Frank Weinreich

Area
  - Total: 14.94 km^{2} (5.77 sq mi)
- Elevation: 29 m (95 ft)

Population (2025-12-31)
  - Total: 333
  - Density: 22.3/km^{2} (57.7/sq mi)
- Time zone: UTC+01:00 (CET)
  - Summer (DST): UTC+02:00 (CEST)
- Postal codes: 17089
- Dialling codes: 03961
- Vehicle registration: DM
- Website: www.altentreptow.de

Grapzow is a municipality in the Mecklenburgische Seenplatte district, in Mecklenburg-Vorpommern, Germany.
