= Kentzlin =

- Municipality
- Location of Kentzlin within Mecklenburgische Seenplatte district
- Interactive map of Kentzlin
- Location within Germany Location within Mecklenburg-Vorpommern
- Coordinates: 53°45′N 12°58′E
- Country: Germany
- State: Mecklenburg-Vorpommern
- District: Mecklenburgische Seenplatte
- Municipal assoc.: Demmin-Land
- Subdivisions: 2

Government
  - Mayor: Reinhard Schumacher

Area
  - Total: 11.76 km^{2} (4.54 sq mi)
- Elevation: 54 m (177 ft)

Population (2025-12-31)
  - Total: 185
  - Density: 15.7/km^{2} (40.7/sq mi)
- Time zone: UTC+01:00 (CET)
  - Summer (DST): UTC+02:00 (CEST)
- Postal codes: 17111
- Dialling codes: 039952
- Vehicle registration: DM
- Website: www.amt-demmin-land.de

Kentzlin is a municipality in the Mecklenburgische Seenplatte district of Mecklenburg-Vorpommern, Germany.
