= Hohenmocker =

- Municipality
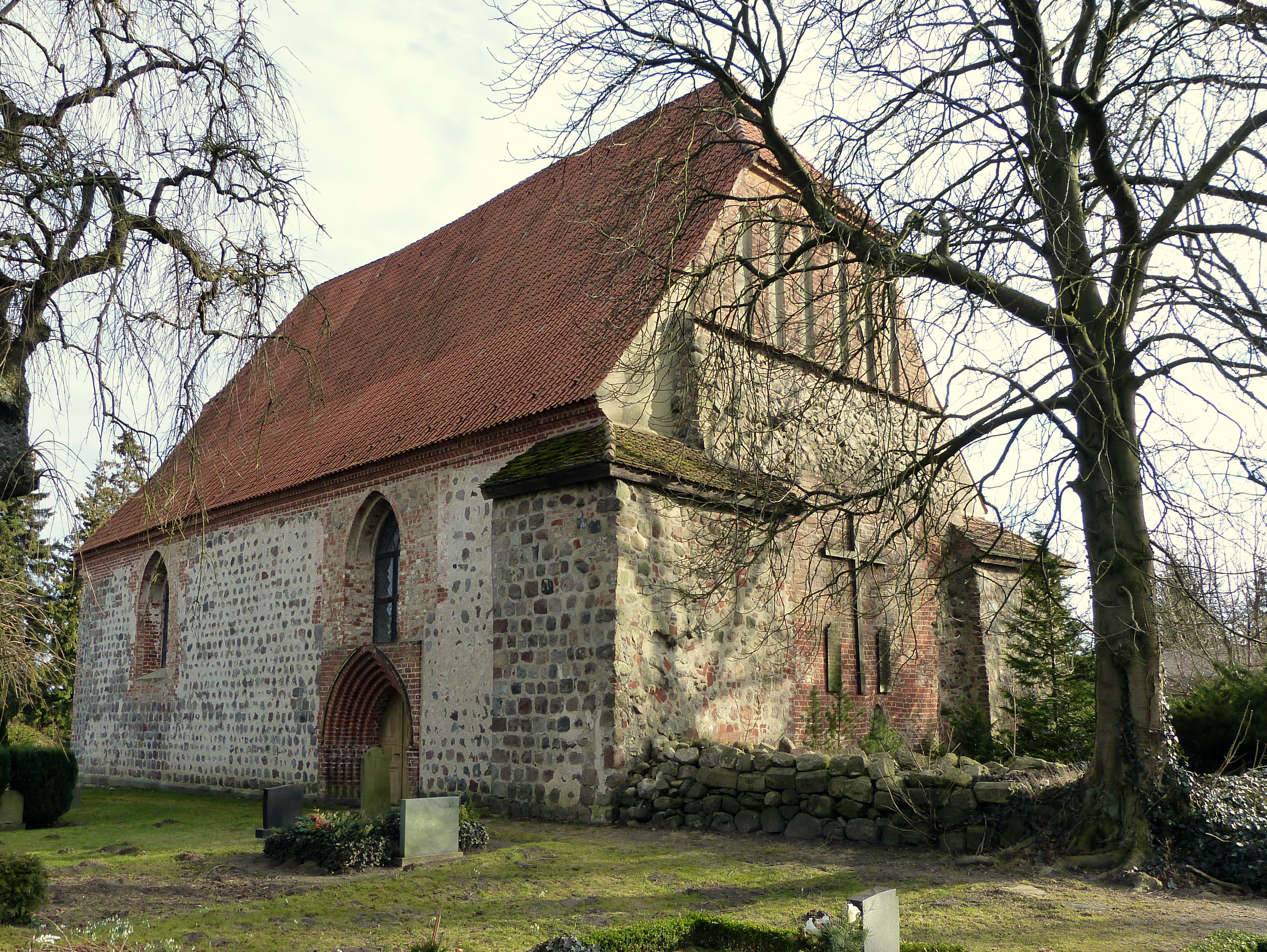
- Medieval church in Hohenmocker

- Location of Hohenmocker within Mecklenburgische Seenplatte district
- Interactive map of Hohenmocker
- Location within Germany Location within Mecklenburg-Vorpommern
- Coordinates: 53°49′N 13°11′E
- Country: Germany
- State: Mecklenburg-Vorpommern
- District: Mecklenburgische Seenplatte
- Municipal assoc.: Demmin-Land
- Subdivisions: 6

Government
  - Mayor: Thomas Korrmann

Area
  - Total: 26.85 km^{2} (10.37 sq mi)
- Elevation: 42 m (138 ft)

Population (2025-12-31)
  - Total: 441
  - Density: 16.4/km^{2} (42.5/sq mi)
- Time zone: UTC+01:00 (CET)
  - Summer (DST): UTC+02:00 (CEST)
- Postal codes: 17111
- Dialling codes: 039993
- Vehicle registration: DM
- Website: www.amt-demmin-land.de

Hohenmocker is a municipality in the Mecklenburgische Seenplatte district, in Mecklenburg-Vorpommern, Germany.
