= Groß Teetzleben =

- Municipality
- Location of Groß Teetzleben within Mecklenburgische Seenplatte district
- Interactive map of Groß Teetzleben
- Location within Germany Location within Mecklenburg-Vorpommern
- Coordinates: 53°39′N 13°14′E
- Country: Germany
- State: Mecklenburg-Vorpommern
- District: Mecklenburgische Seenplatte
- Municipal assoc.: Treptower Tollensewinkel
- Subdivisions: 5

Government
  - Mayor: Karin Heß

Area
  - Total: 21.67 km^{2} (8.37 sq mi)
- Elevation: 54 m (177 ft)

Population (2025-12-31)
  - Total: 642
  - Density: 29.6/km^{2} (76.7/sq mi)
- Time zone: UTC+01:00 (CET)
  - Summer (DST): UTC+02:00 (CEST)
- Postal codes: 17091
- Dialling codes: 03961
- Vehicle registration: DM
- Website: www.altentreptow.de

Groß Teetzleben is a municipality in the Mecklenburgische Seenplatte district, in Mecklenburg-Vorpommern, Germany.
