= Burow =

- Municipality
- Location of Burow within Mecklenburgische Seenplatte district
- Interactive map of Burow
- Location within Germany Location within Mecklenburg-Vorpommern
- Coordinates: 53°47′N 13°16′E
- Country: Germany
- State: Mecklenburg-Vorpommern
- District: Mecklenburgische Seenplatte
- Municipal assoc.: Treptower Tollensewinkel
- Subdivisions: 3

Government
  - Mayor: Heidrun Bach

Area
  - Total: 17.33 km^{2} (6.69 sq mi)
- Elevation: 35 m (115 ft)

Population (2025-12-31)
  - Total: 838
  - Density: 48.4/km^{2} (125/sq mi)
- Time zone: UTC+01:00 (CET)
  - Summer (DST): UTC+02:00 (CEST)
- Postal codes: 17089
- Dialling codes: 03965
- Vehicle registration: DM
- Website: www.altentreptow.de

Burow is a municipality in the Mecklenburgische Seenplatte district, in Mecklenburg-Vorpommern, Germany.
