= Wolde =

- Municipality
- Location of Wolde within Mecklenburgische Seenplatte district
- Interactive map of Wolde
- Location within Germany Location within Mecklenburg-Vorpommern
- Coordinates: 53°41′N 13°05′E
- Country: Germany
- State: Mecklenburg-Vorpommern
- District: Mecklenburgische Seenplatte
- Municipal assoc.: Treptower Tollensewinkel
- Subdivisions: 5

Government
  - Mayor: Marion Dorn

Area
  - Total: 22.51 km^{2} (8.69 sq mi)
- Elevation: 49 m (161 ft)

Population (2025-12-31)
  - Total: 537
  - Density: 23.9/km^{2} (61.8/sq mi)
- Time zone: UTC+01:00 (CET)
  - Summer (DST): UTC+02:00 (CEST)
- Postal codes: 17091
- Dialling codes: 039600, 039604
- Vehicle registration: DM
- Website: www.altentreptow.de

Wolde is a municipality in the Mecklenburgische Seenplatte district, in Mecklenburg-Vorpommern, Germany.
