= Knorrendorf =

- Municipality
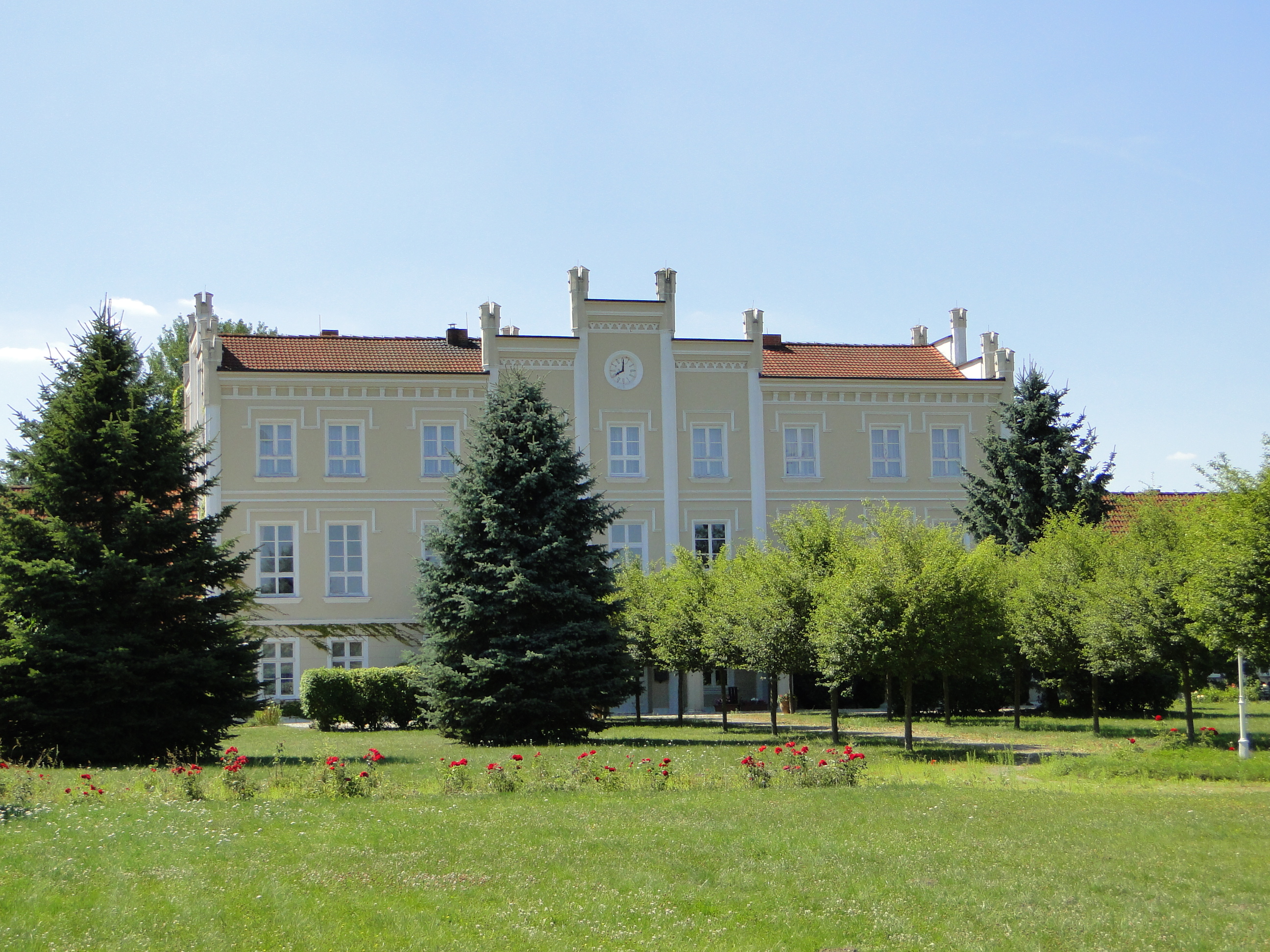
- Kastorf Manor in Knorrendorf

- Location of Knorrendorf within Mecklenburgische Seenplatte district
- Interactive map of Knorrendorf
- Location within Germany Location within Mecklenburg-Vorpommern
- Coordinates: 53°38′N 13°04′E
- Country: Germany
- State: Mecklenburg-Vorpommern
- District: Mecklenburgische Seenplatte
- Municipal assoc.: Stavenhagen
- Subdivisions: 6

Government
  - Mayor: Sebastian Henke

Area
  - Total: 28.51 km^{2} (11.01 sq mi)
- Elevation: 58 m (190 ft)

Population (2025-12-31)
  - Total: 513
  - Density: 18.0/km^{2} (46.6/sq mi)
- Time zone: UTC+01:00 (CET)
  - Summer (DST): UTC+02:00 (CEST)
- Postal codes: 17091
- Dialling codes: 039602
- Vehicle registration: DM
- Website: www.stavenhagen.de

Knorrendorf is a municipality in the Mecklenburgische Seenplatte district, in Mecklenburg-Vorpommern, Germany.
