= Hohenbollentin =

- Municipality
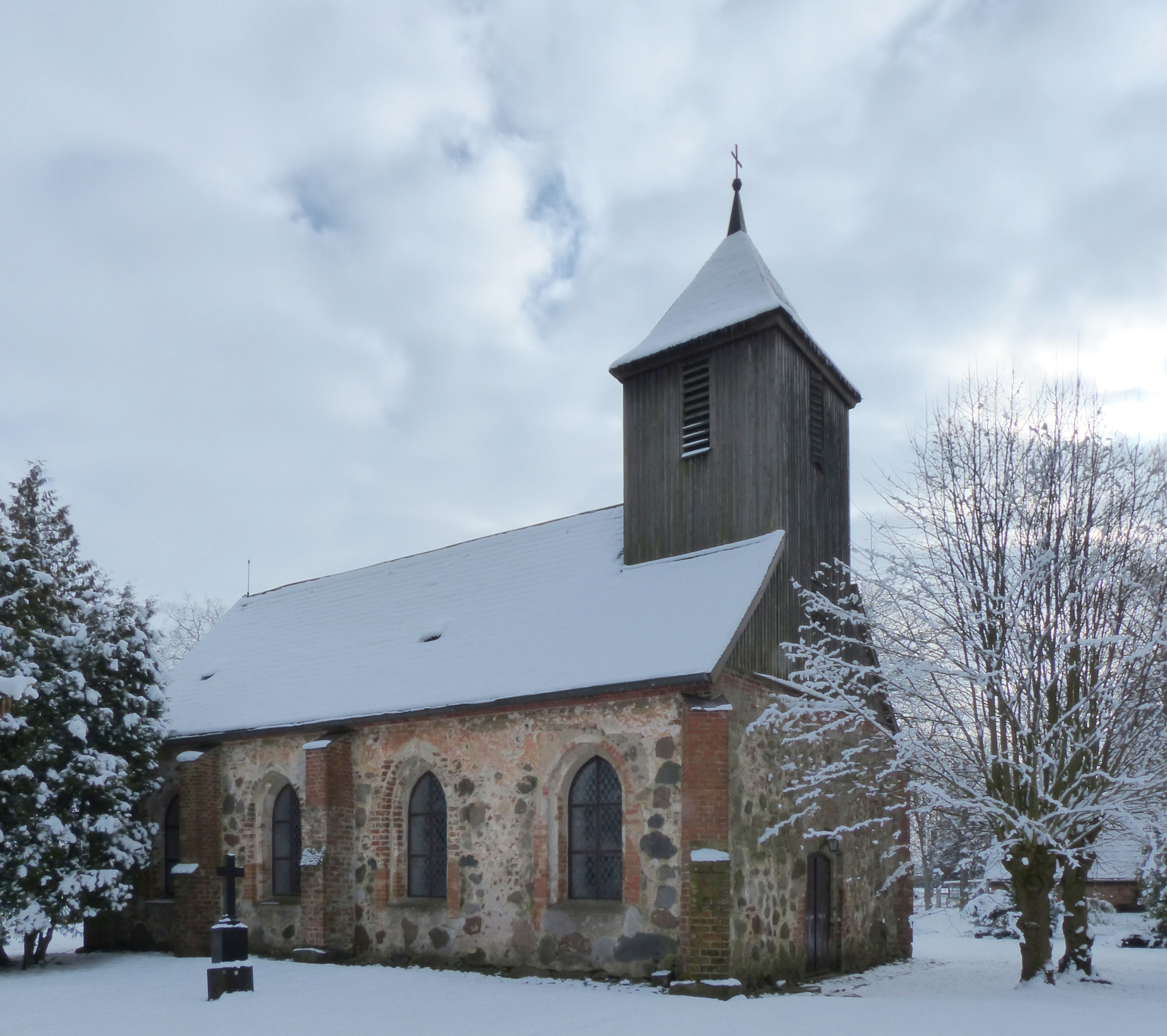
- Church in Hohenbollentin

- Location of Hohenbollentin within Mecklenburgische Seenplatte district
- Interactive map of Hohenbollentin
- Location within Germany Location within Mecklenburg-Vorpommern
- Coordinates: 53°47′N 13°01′E
- Country: Germany
- State: Mecklenburg-Vorpommern
- District: Mecklenburgische Seenplatte
- Municipal assoc.: Demmin-Land

Government
  - Mayor: Hans-Jörg Schommer

Area
  - Total: 6.30 km^{2} (2.43 sq mi)
- Elevation: 39 m (128 ft)

Population (2025-12-31)
  - Total: 100
  - Density: 16/km^{2} (41/sq mi)
- Time zone: UTC+01:00 (CET)
  - Summer (DST): UTC+02:00 (CEST)
- Postal codes: 17111
- Dialling codes: 039996
- Vehicle registration: DM
- Website: www.amt-demmin-land.de

Hohenbollentin is a municipality in the Mecklenburgische Seenplatte district, in Mecklenburg-Vorpommern, Germany.
