= Sommersdorf, Mecklenburg-Vorpommern =

Sommersdorf
- Municipality
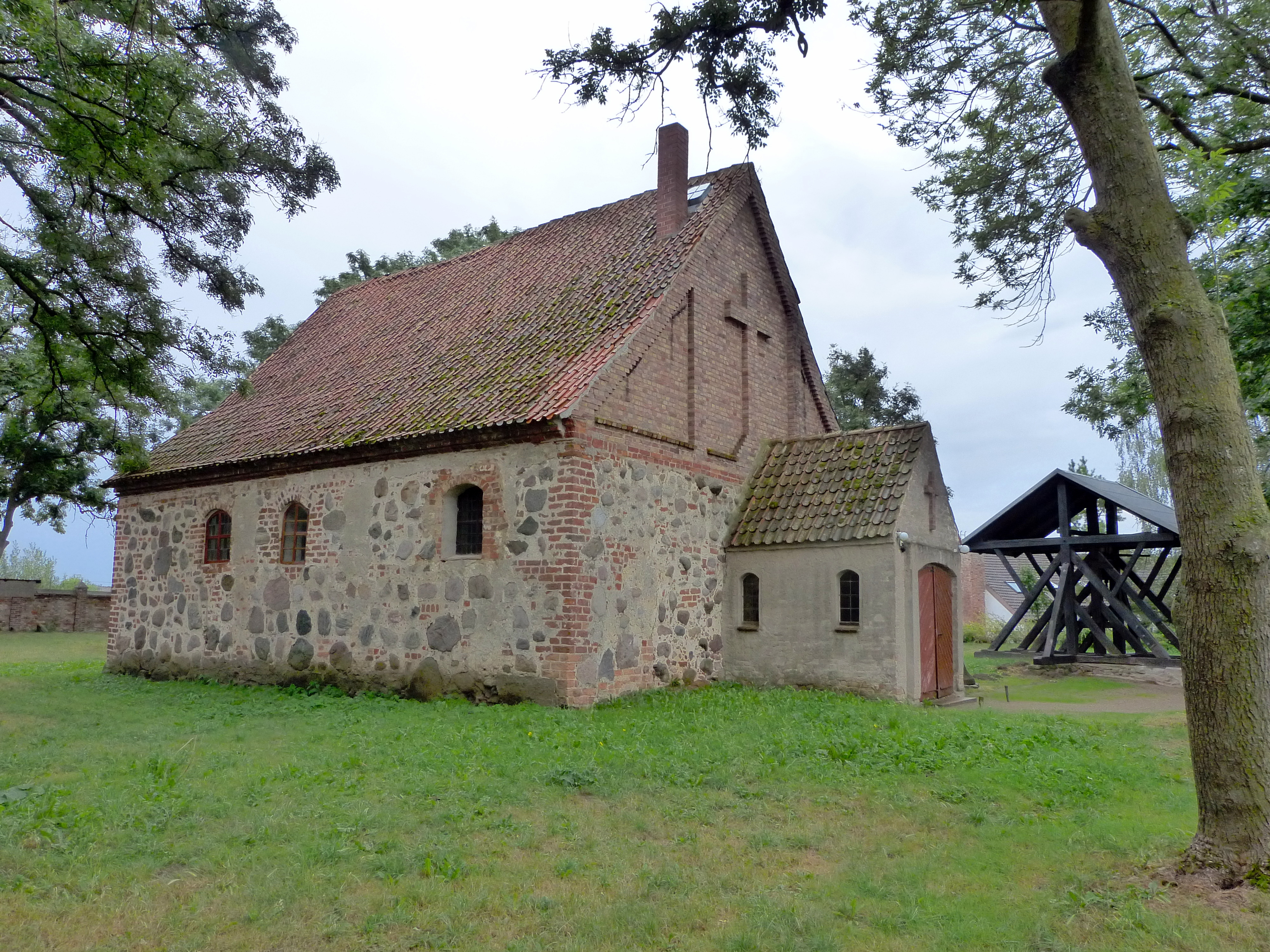
- Village church in Sommersdorf

- Location of Sommersdorf within Mecklenburgische Seenplatte district
- Interactive map of Sommersdorf
- Location within Germany Location within Mecklenburg-Vorpommern
- Coordinates: 53°48′N 12°54′E
- Country: Germany
- State: Mecklenburg-Vorpommern
- District: Mecklenburgische Seenplatte
- Municipal assoc.: Demmin-Land

Government
  - Mayor: Jens Brehmer

Area
  - Total: 8.71 km^{2} (3.36 sq mi)
- Elevation: 24 m (79 ft)

Population (2025-12-31)
  - Total: 266
  - Density: 30.5/km^{2} (79.1/sq mi)
- Time zone: UTC+01:00 (CET)
  - Summer (DST): UTC+02:00 (CEST)
- Postal codes: 17111
- Dialling codes: 039952
- Vehicle registration: DM
- Website: www.amt-demmin-land.de

Sommersdorf is a municipality in the Mecklenburgische Seenplatte district, in Mecklenburg-Vorpommern, Germany.
