= Grammentin =

- Municipality
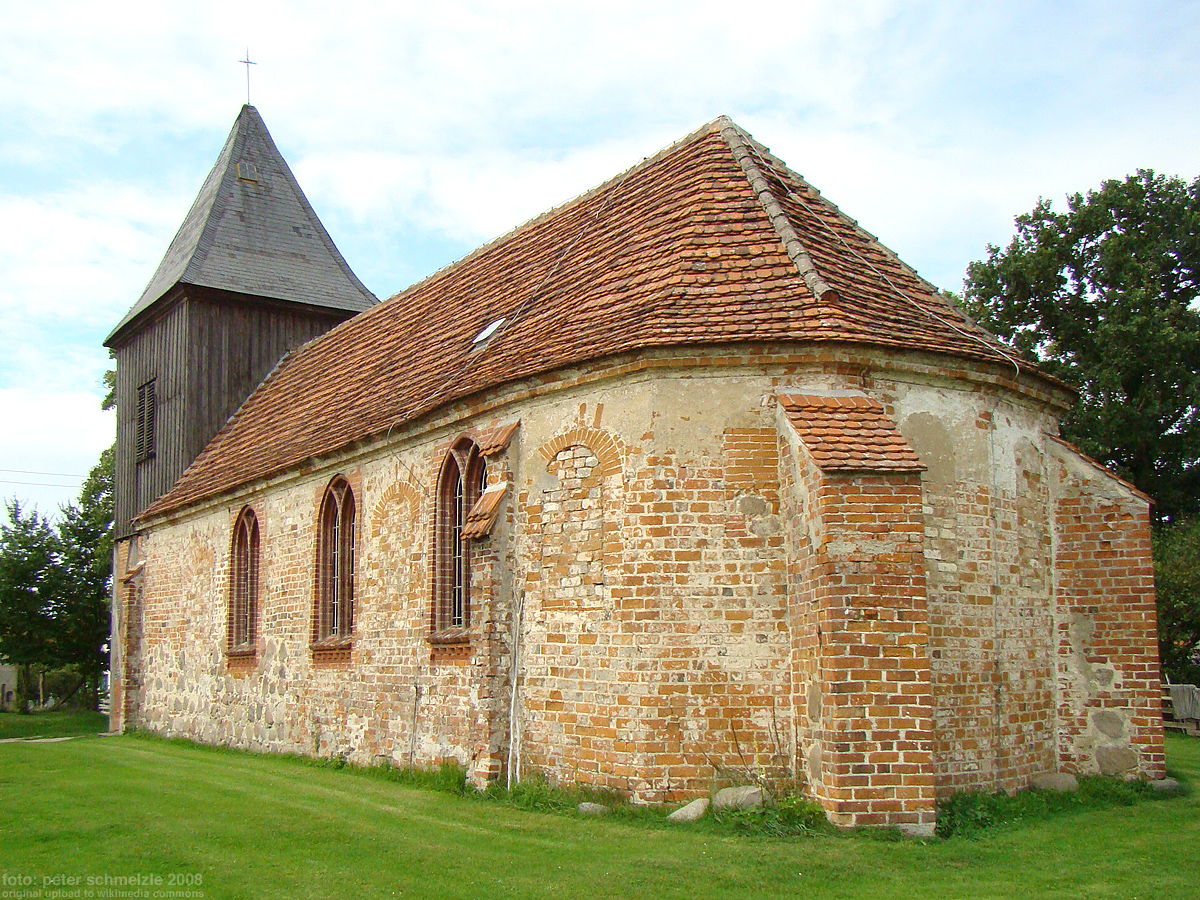
- Grammentin village church

- Location of Grammentin within Mecklenburgische Seenplatte district
- Interactive map of Grammentin
- Location within Germany Location within Mecklenburg-Vorpommern
- Coordinates: 53°45′N 12°54′E
- Country: Germany
- State: Mecklenburg-Vorpommern
- District: Mecklenburgische Seenplatte
- Municipal assoc.: Stavenhagen

Government
  - Mayor: Wolfhard Hornburg

Area
  - Total: 17.21 km^{2} (6.64 sq mi)
- Elevation: 48 m (157 ft)

Population (2025-12-31)
  - Total: 230
  - Density: 13/km^{2} (35/sq mi)
- Time zone: UTC+01:00 (CET)
  - Summer (DST): UTC+02:00 (CEST)
- Postal codes: 17153
- Dialling codes: 039952
- Vehicle registration: DM
- Website: www.stavenhagen.de

Grammentin is a municipality in the Mecklenburgische Seenplatte district, in Mecklenburg-Vorpommern, Germany.
