= Golchen =

- Municipality
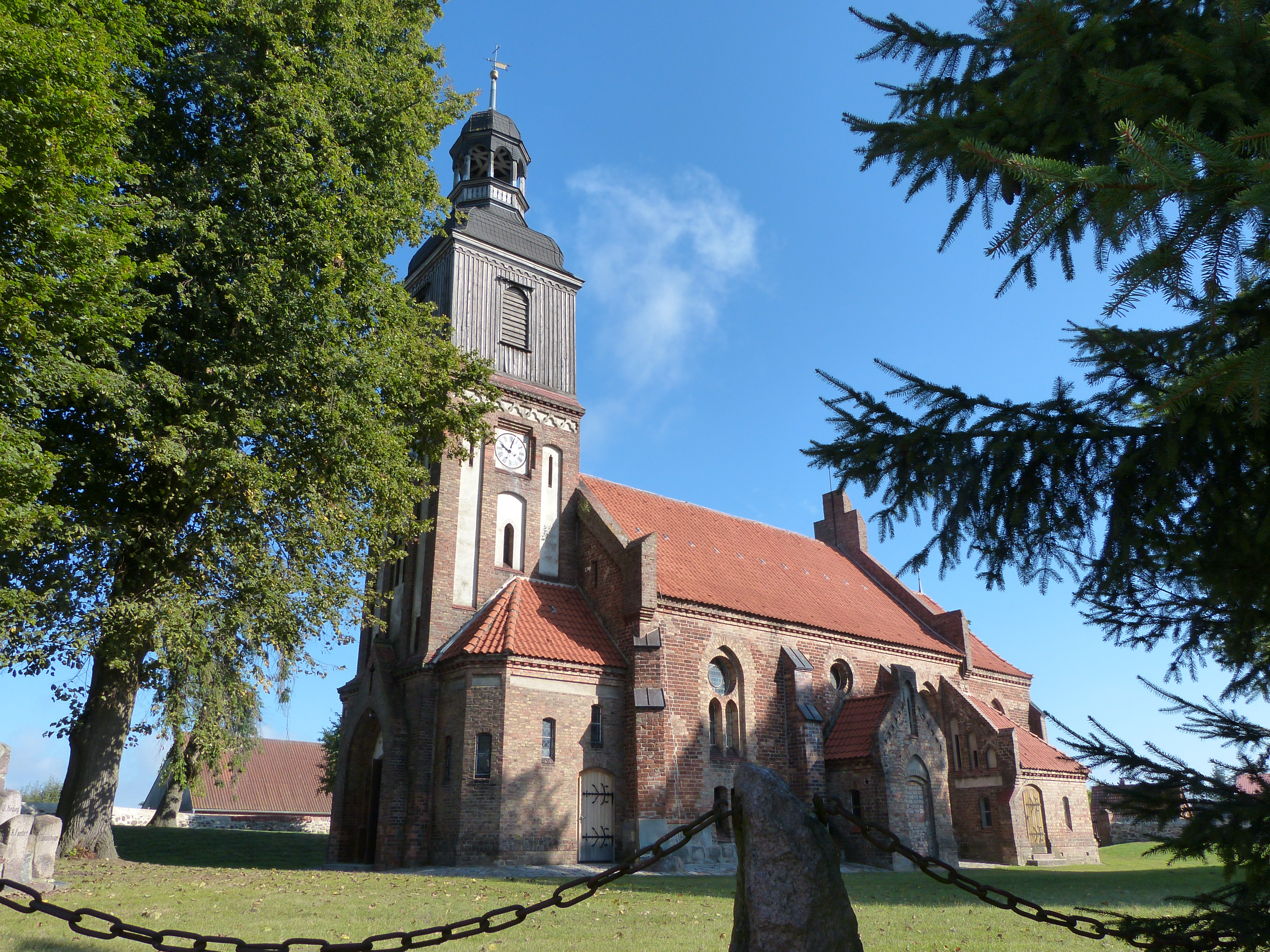

- Location of Golchen within Mecklenburgische Seenplatte district
- Interactive map of Golchen
- Location within Germany Location within Mecklenburg-Vorpommern
- Coordinates: 53°48′N 13°17′E
- Country: Germany
- State: Mecklenburg-Vorpommern
- District: Mecklenburgische Seenplatte
- Municipal assoc.: Treptower Tollensewinkel
- Subdivisions: 4

Government
  - Mayor: Gerhard Fuchs

Area
  - Total: 23.32 km^{2} (9.00 sq mi)
- Elevation: 2 m (6.6 ft)

Population (2025-12-31)
  - Total: 261
  - Density: 11.2/km^{2} (29.0/sq mi)
- Time zone: UTC+01:00 (CET)
  - Summer (DST): UTC+02:00 (CEST)
- Postal codes: 17089
- Dialling codes: 03965
- Vehicle registration: DM, MSE, AT
- Website: www.altentreptow.de

Golchen is a municipality in the Mecklenburgische Seenplatte district, in Mecklenburg-Vorpommern, Germany.

== Districts ==
- Golchen
- Rohrsoll
- Ludwigshöhe
- Tückhude
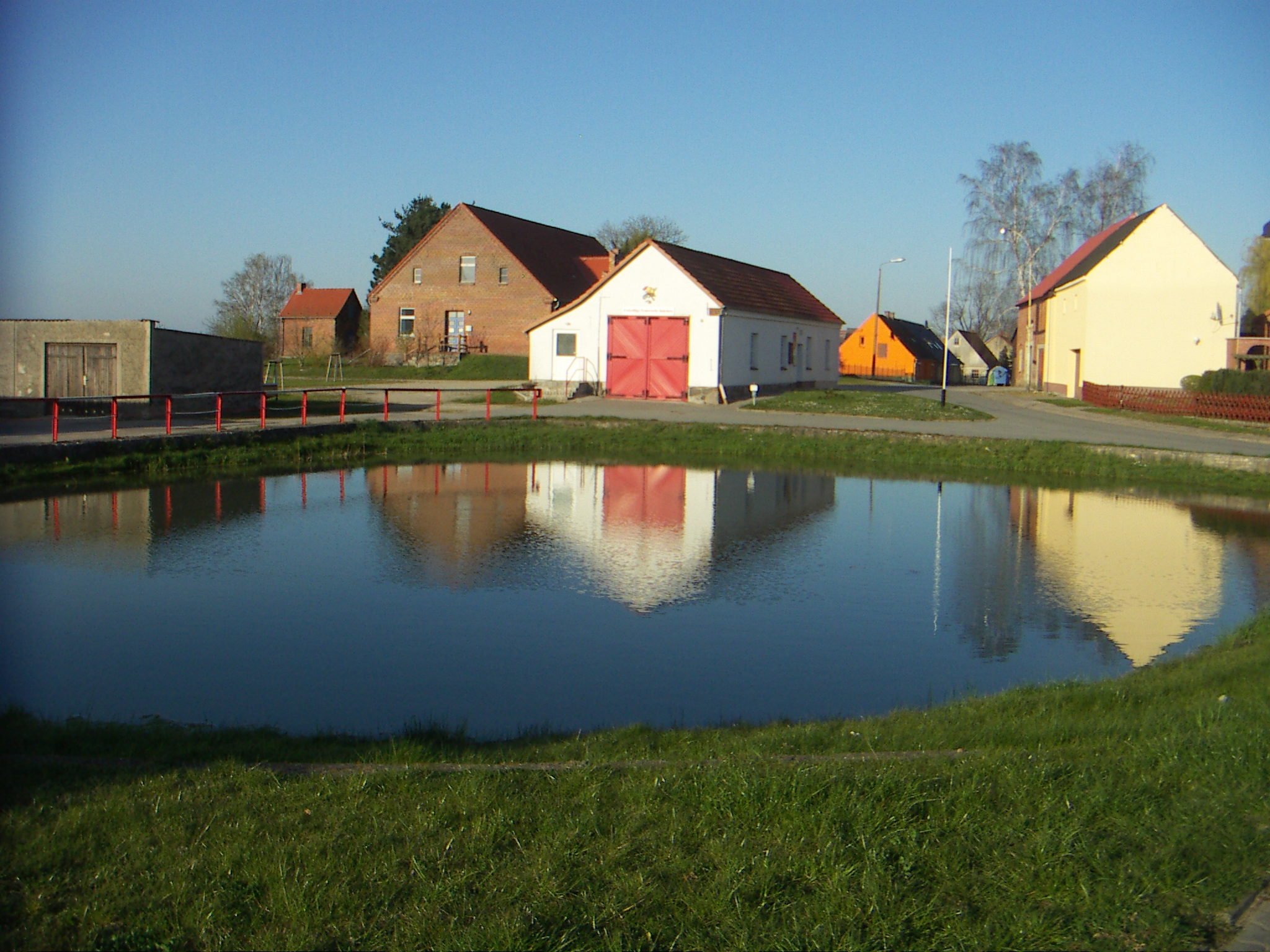
Volunatary fire brigade and fire pond Golchen

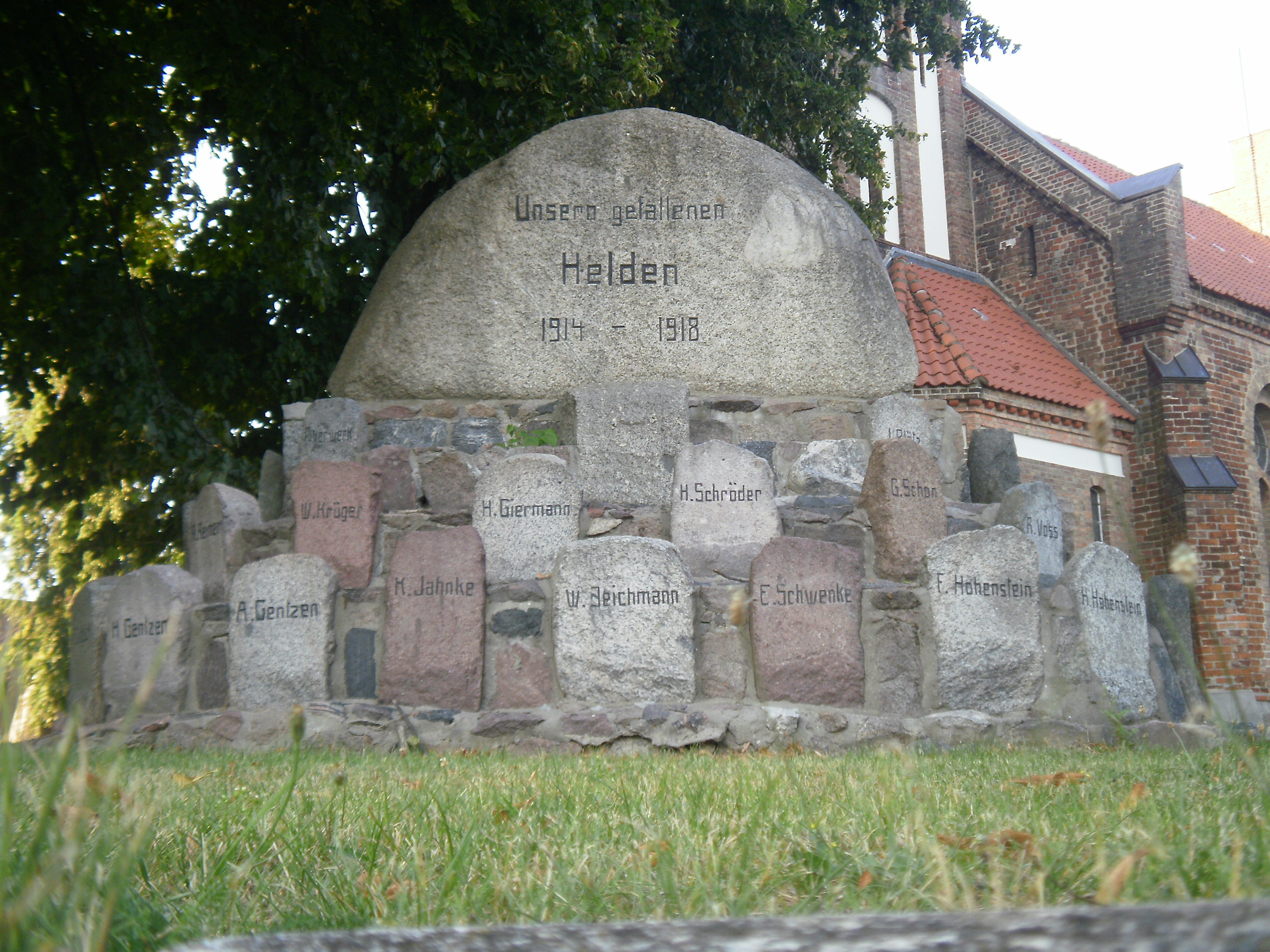
WW1 War Memorial
