= Düvier =

- Ortsteil of Loitz
- Interactive map of Düvier
- Location within Germany Location within Mecklenburg-Vorpommern
- Coordinates: 54°01′0″N 13°04′05″E
- Country: Germany
- State: Mecklenburg-Vorpommern
- District: Vorpommern-Greifswald
- Town: Loitz
- Subdivisions: 4 Ortsteile

Area
  - Total: 26.57 km^{2} (10.26 sq mi)
- Elevation: 2 m (6.6 ft)

Population (2010-12-31)
  - Total: 516
  - Density: 19.4/km^{2} (50.3/sq mi)
- Time zone: UTC+01:00 (CET)
  - Summer (DST): UTC+02:00 (CEST)
- Postal codes: 17121
- Dialling codes: 039998
- Vehicle registration: DM
- Website: www.loitz.de

Düvier is a village and a former municipality in the Vorpommern-Greifswald district, in Mecklenburg-Vorpommern, Germany. Since 1 July 2012, it is part of the town Loitz.

Its name originates from a French Huguenot family that immigrated from Lyon at the end of the 17th century.
