= Bartow, Germany =

Bartow
- Municipality
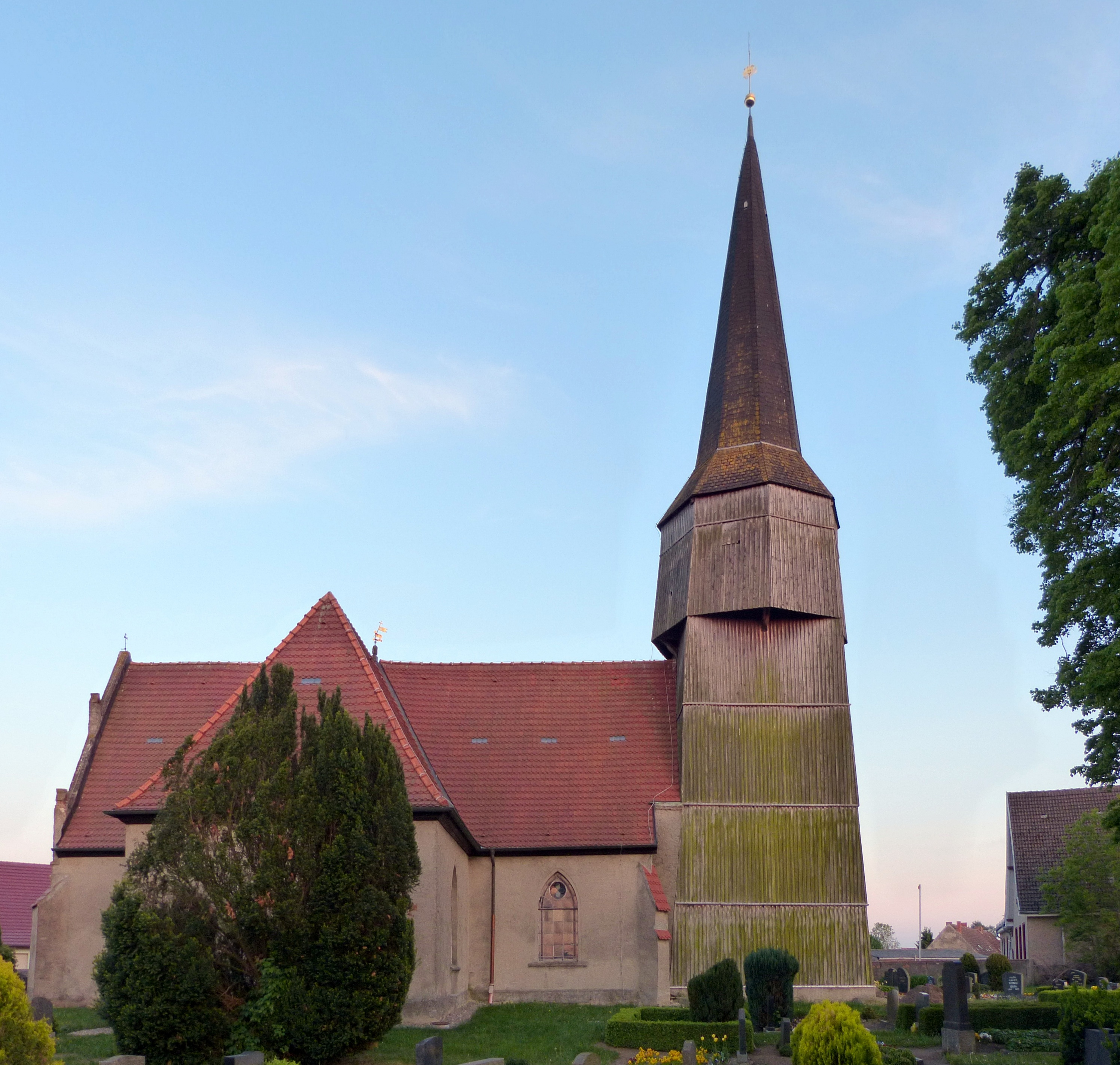
- Church in Bartow

- Location of Bartow within Mecklenburgische Seenplatte district
- Interactive map of Bartow
- Location within Germany Location within Mecklenburg-Vorpommern
- Coordinates: 53°49′N 13°21′E
- Country: Germany
- State: Mecklenburg-Vorpommern
- District: Mecklenburgische Seenplatte
- Municipal assoc.: Treptower Tollensewinkel
- Subdivisions: 3

Government
  - Mayor: Roland Heiden

Area
  - Total: 34.61 km^{2} (13.36 sq mi)
- Elevation: 23 m (75 ft)

Population (2025-12-31)
  - Total: 501
  - Density: 14.5/km^{2} (37.5/sq mi)
- Time zone: UTC+01:00 (CET)
  - Summer (DST): UTC+02:00 (CEST)
- Postal codes: 17089
- Dialling codes: 039991
- Vehicle registration: DM
- Website: www.altentreptow.de

Bartow (German pronunciation: [ˈbaʁtoː]) is a municipality in the Mecklenburgische Seenplatte district, in Mecklenburg-Vorpommern, Germany. In June 2024 it absorbed the former municipality Breest.

The toponym of this settlement was recorded as Bertcow, in 1277; as Bertowe, in 1287; and as Bartekow and Bartkow, in 1401.
