= Meesiger =

- Municipality
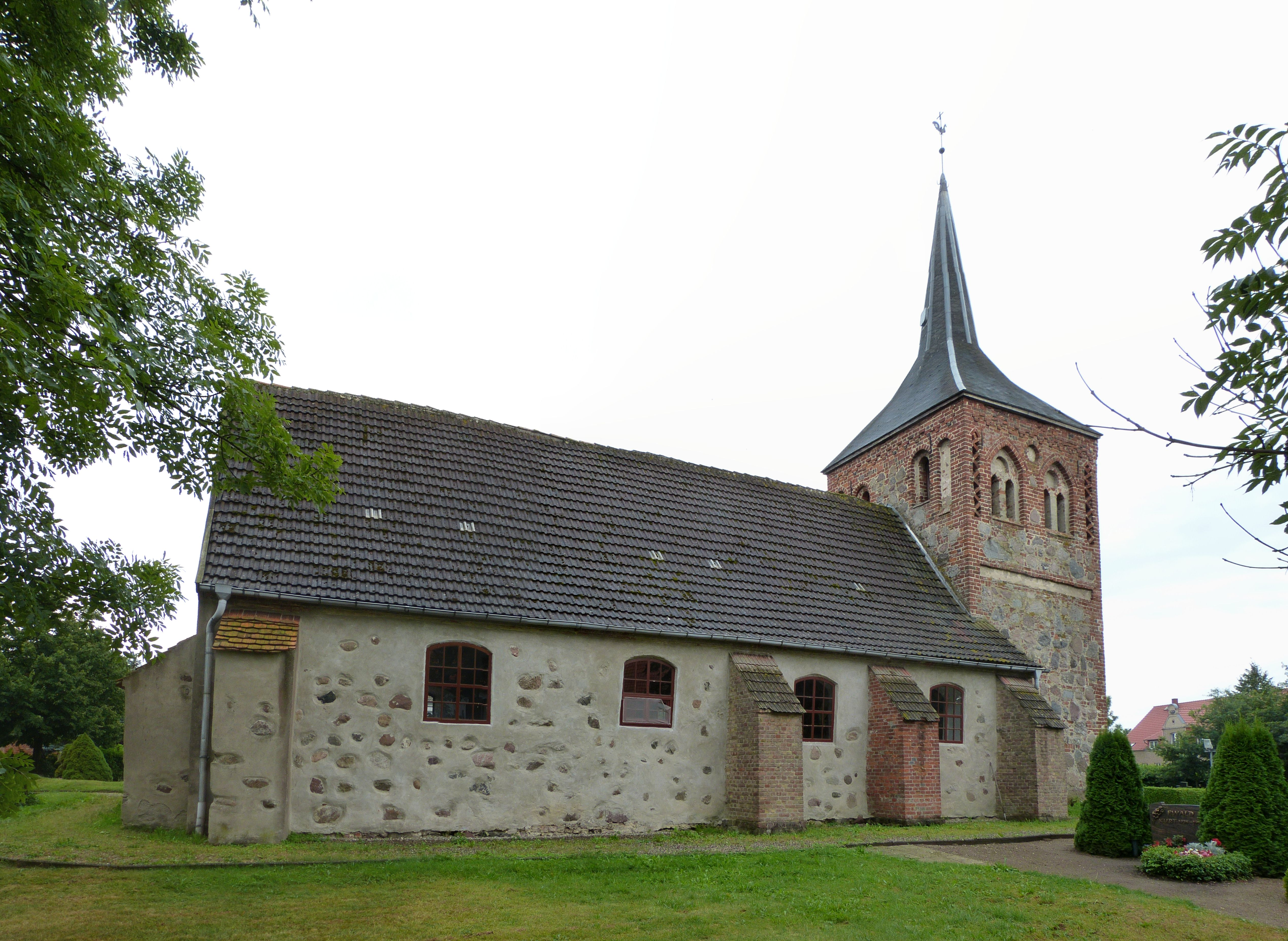
- Medieval church in Meesiger

- Location of Meesiger within Mecklenburgische Seenplatte district
- Interactive map of Meesiger
- Location within Germany Location within Mecklenburg-Vorpommern
- Coordinates: 53°49′N 12°55′E
- Country: Germany
- State: Mecklenburg-Vorpommern
- District: Mecklenburgische Seenplatte
- Municipal assoc.: Demmin-Land

Government
  - Mayor: Benita Meitzner

Area
  - Total: 8.98 km^{2} (3.47 sq mi)
- Elevation: 33 m (108 ft)

Population (2025-12-31)
  - Total: 209
  - Density: 23.3/km^{2} (60.3/sq mi)
- Time zone: UTC+01:00 (CET)
  - Summer (DST): UTC+02:00 (CEST)
- Postal codes: 17111
- Dialling codes: 039994
- Vehicle registration: DM
- Website: www.amt-demmin-land.de

Meesiger is a municipality in the Mecklenburgische Seenplatte district, in Mecklenburg-Vorpommern, Germany. It has a population of 305.
