= Sarow =

- Municipality
- Location of Sarow within Mecklenburgische Seenplatte district
- Interactive map of Sarow
- Location within Germany Location within Mecklenburg-Vorpommern
- Coordinates: 53°48′N 13°06′E
- Country: Germany
- State: Mecklenburg-Vorpommern
- District: Mecklenburgische Seenplatte
- Municipal assoc.: Demmin-Land
- Subdivisions: 4

Government
  - Mayor: Friedhelm Wyrwich

Area
  - Total: 33.61 km^{2} (12.98 sq mi)
- Elevation: 54 m (177 ft)

Population (2025-12-31)
  - Total: 666
  - Density: 19.8/km^{2} (51.3/sq mi)
- Time zone: UTC+01:00 (CET)
  - Summer (DST): UTC+02:00 (CEST)
- Postal codes: 17111
- Dialling codes: 039996
- Vehicle registration: DM / MSE
- Website: www.amt-demmin-land.de

Sarow is a municipality in the Mecklenburgische Seenplatte district, in Mecklenburg-Vorpommern, Germany.

It is subdivided in the four villages of Ganschendorf, Gehmkow, Sarow and Törpin.
