= Gnevkow =

- Municipality
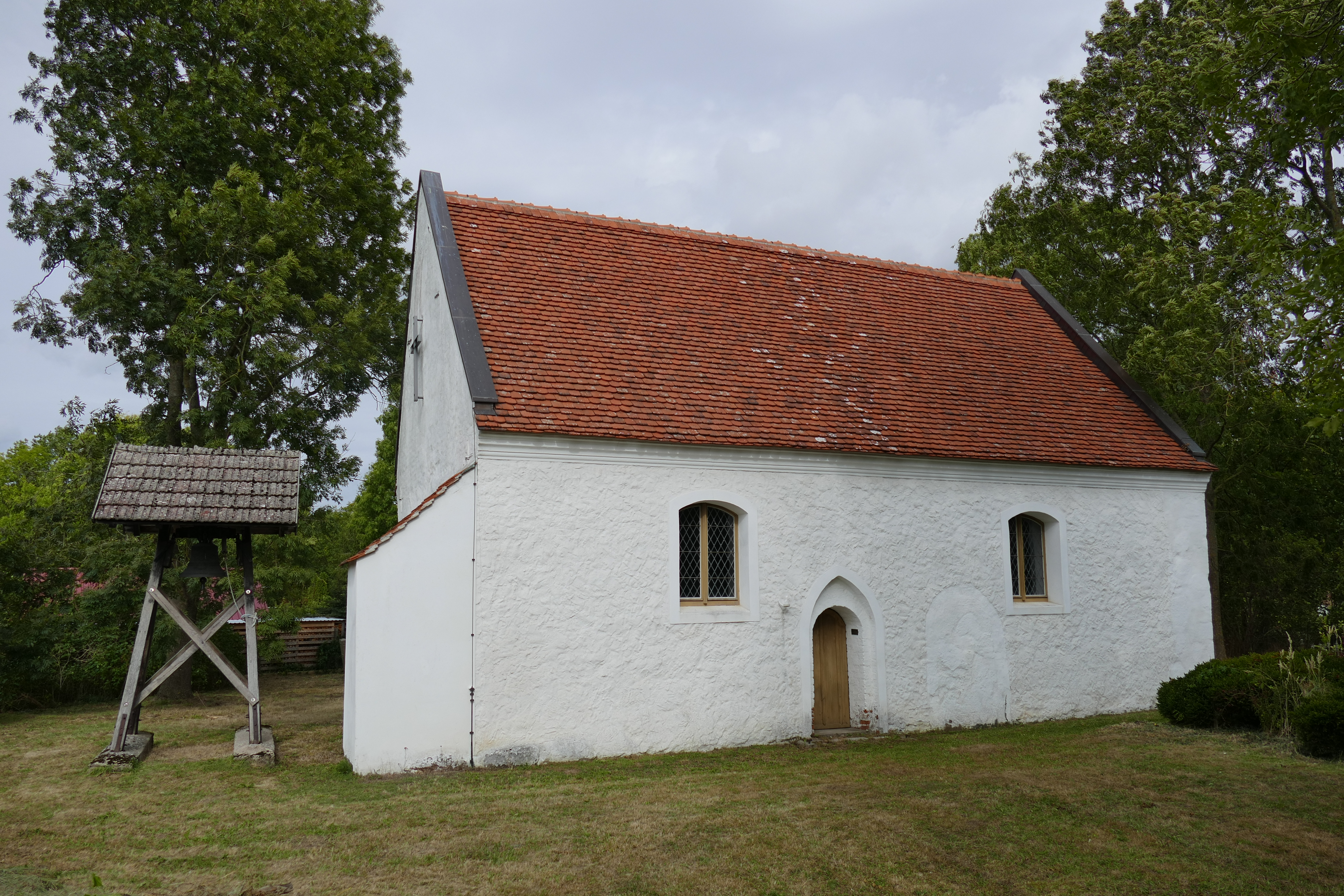
- Village church in Gnevkow

- Location of Gnevkow within Mecklenburgische Seenplatte district
- Interactive map of Gnevkow
- Location within Germany Location within Mecklenburg-Vorpommern
- Coordinates: 53°47′N 13°10′E
- Country: Germany
- State: Mecklenburg-Vorpommern
- District: Mecklenburgische Seenplatte
- Municipal assoc.: Treptower Tollensewinkel
- Subdivisions: 4

Government
  - Mayor: Gerhard Krüger

Area
  - Total: 17.13 km^{2} (6.61 sq mi)
- Elevation: 49 m (161 ft)

Population (2025-12-31)
  - Total: 288
  - Density: 16.8/km^{2} (43.5/sq mi)
- Time zone: UTC+01:00 (CET)
  - Summer (DST): UTC+02:00 (CEST)
- Postal codes: 17089
- Dialling codes: 039993
- Vehicle registration: DM
- Website: www.altentreptow.de

Gnevkow is a municipality in the Mecklenburgische Seenplatte district, in Mecklenburg-Vorpommern, Germany.

== Districts ==
Gnevkow is made up of the following five districts:

Gnevkow, Marienhöhe, Letzin, Letzin-Siedlung, Prützen,

== History ==
Gnevkow was first mentioned 1268. Until 1818 the place belonged to the Klempenow Castle. In 1862, the village Gnewkow with the State Manor Estate (Staatsdomänenvorwerk) and Marienhöhe, had 421 inhabitants.

== Village Church ==
The village church in Gnevkow is a render boulder church dating from the 15th century. The altar wall shows holy figures from the first half 16th century. The pulpit basket out of the 17th century is flanked of two Mary figures and two angels (14th century and first half 16th century). Next to the western gable wall is new bell frame with a bell dating from 1827. Between 1999 and 2003, the foundation, walls and roof of the church were repaired.

== Domäne Gnevkow (Gnevkow Manor House) ==
The manor house was built between 1860 and 1862 to manage the immediate estate, the construction taking the standard estate (Domäne) form with the manor house at the far end of a large courtyard with a pond and barns to either side.
