= Lindenberg, Mecklenburg-Vorpommern =

Lindenberg
- Municipality
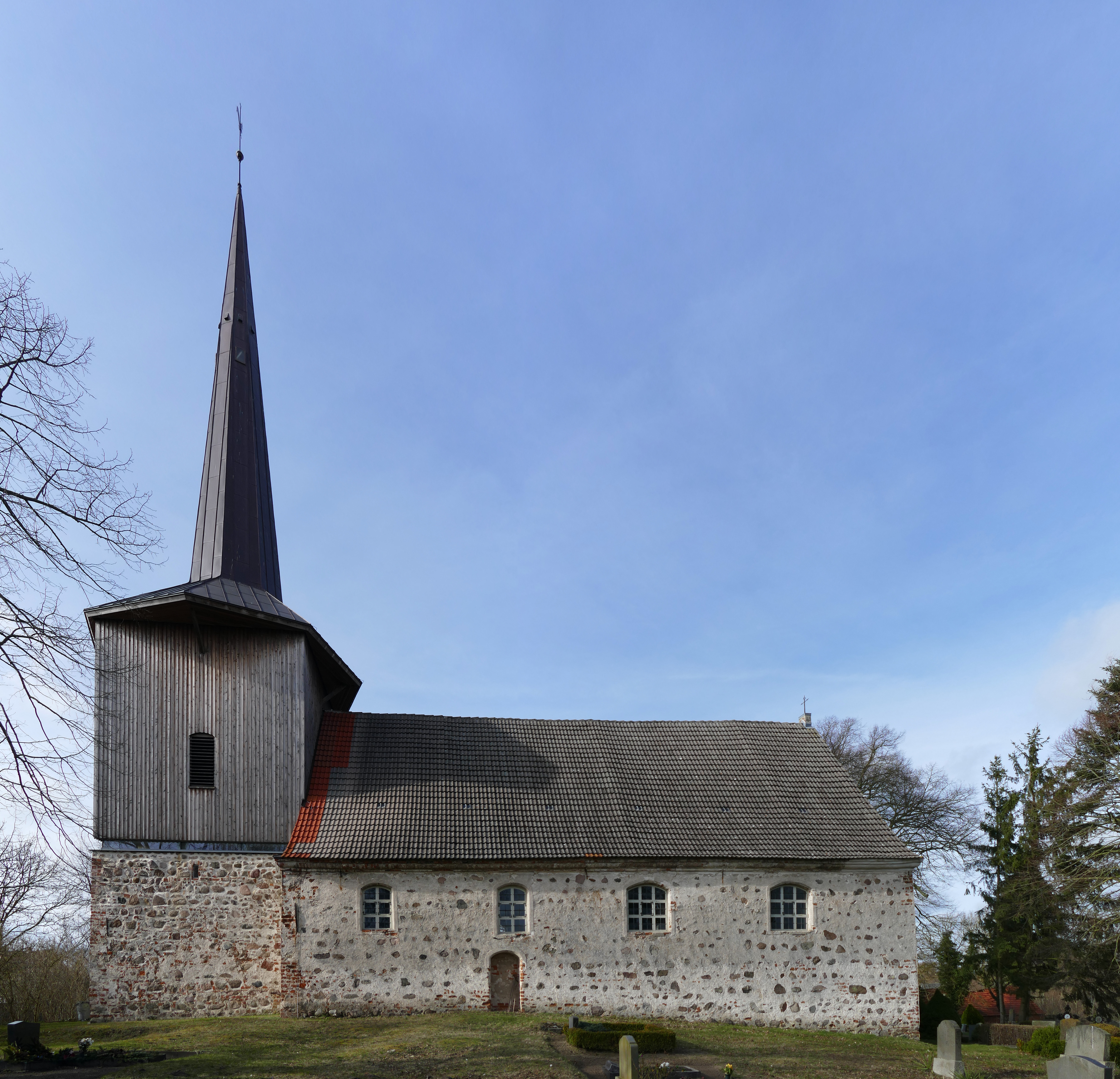
- Church in Lindenberg

- Location of Lindenberg within Mecklenburgische Seenplatte district
- Interactive map of Lindenberg
- Location within Germany Location within Mecklenburg-Vorpommern
- Coordinates: 53°46′N 13°01′E
- Country: Germany
- State: Mecklenburg-Vorpommern
- District: Mecklenburgische Seenplatte
- Municipal assoc.: Demmin-Land
- Subdivisions: 3

Government
  - Mayor: Volkmar Hirschner

Area
  - Total: 13.08 km^{2} (5.05 sq mi)
- Elevation: 44 m (144 ft)

Population (2025-12-31)
  - Total: 196
  - Density: 15.0/km^{2} (38.8/sq mi)
- Time zone: UTC+01:00 (CET)
  - Summer (DST): UTC+02:00 (CEST)
- Postal codes: 17111
- Dialling codes: 039996
- Vehicle registration: DM
- Website: www.amt-demmin-land.de

Lindenberg (German pronunciation: [ˈlɪndn̩ˌbɛʁk]) is a municipality in the Mecklenburgische Seenplatte district, in Mecklenburg-Vorpommern, Germany.

== Villages ==
- Lindenberg
- Hasseldorf
- Krusemarkshagen
