= Ritzerow =

- Municipality
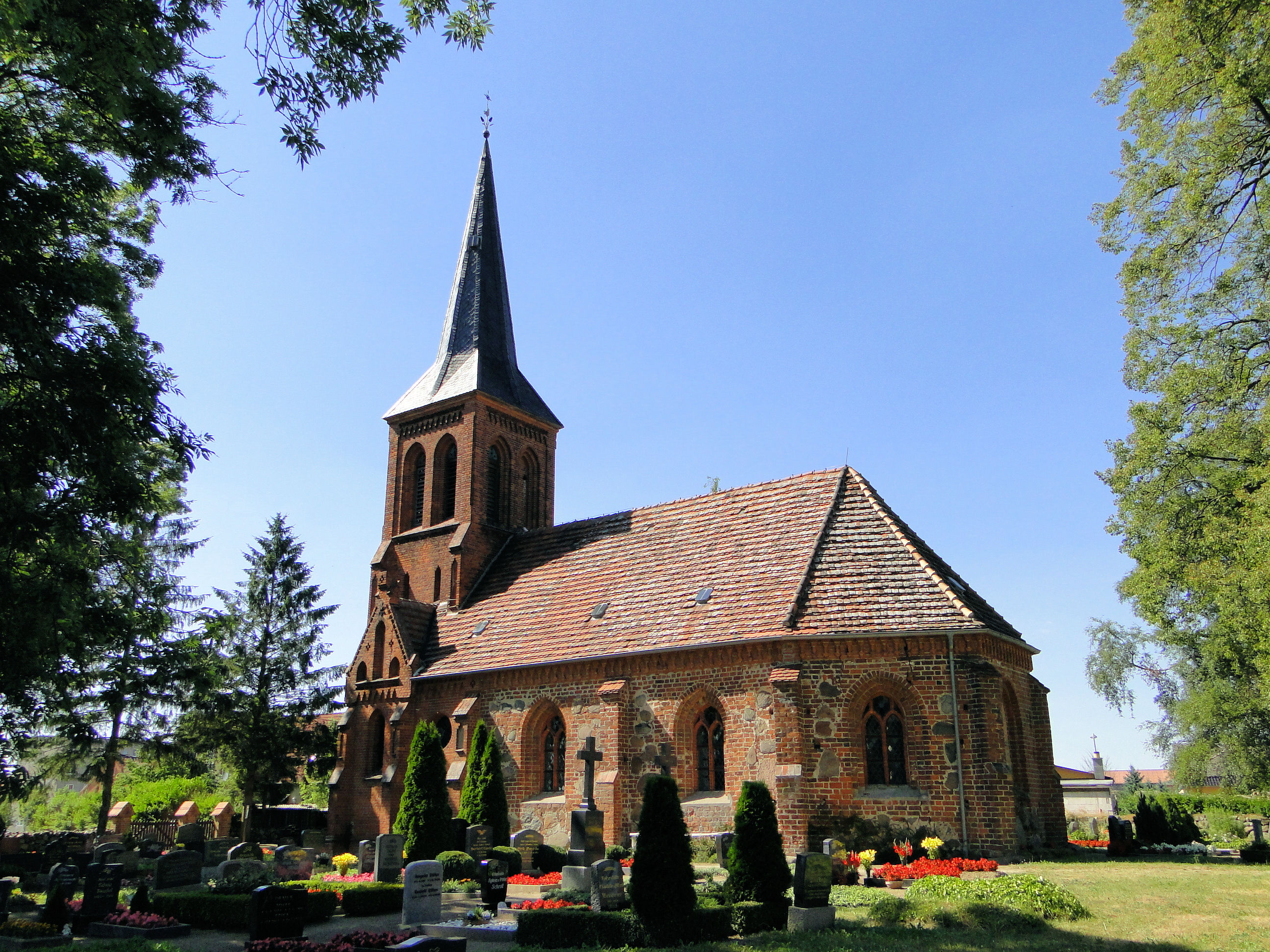
- Ritzerow Church

- Location of Ritzerow within Mecklenburgische Seenplatte district
- Interactive map of Ritzerow
- Location within Germany Location within Mecklenburg-Vorpommern
- Coordinates: 53°40′N 12°58′E
- Country: Germany
- State: Mecklenburg-Vorpommern
- District: Mecklenburgische Seenplatte
- Municipal assoc.: Stavenhagen
- Subdivisions: 3

Government
  - Mayor: Jürgen Höppner

Area
  - Total: 21.76 km^{2} (8.40 sq mi)
- Elevation: 68 m (223 ft)

Population (2025-12-31)
  - Total: 360
  - Density: 17/km^{2} (43/sq mi)
- Time zone: UTC+01:00 (CET)
  - Summer (DST): UTC+02:00 (CEST)
- Postal codes: 17153
- Dialling codes: 039954
- Vehicle registration: DM
- Website: www.stavenhagen.de

Ritzerow is a municipality in the Mecklenburgische Seenplatte district, in Mecklenburg-Vorpommern, Germany.
