= Briggow =

- Municipality
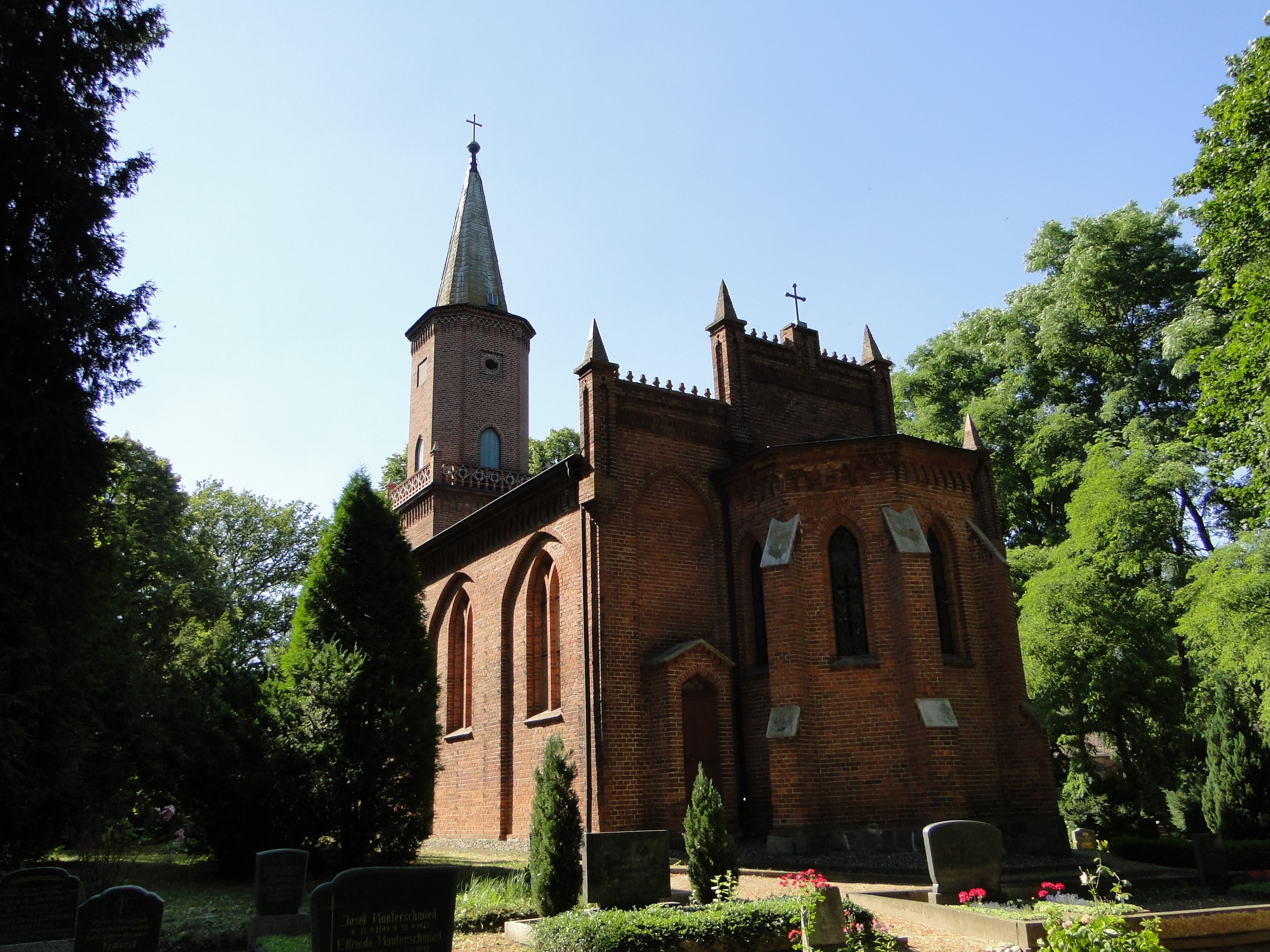
- Church in Briggow

- Location of Briggow within Mecklenburgische Seenplatte district
- Interactive map of Briggow
- Location within Germany Location within Mecklenburg-Vorpommern
- Coordinates: 53°37′N 12°59′E
- Country: Germany
- State: Mecklenburg-Vorpommern
- District: Mecklenburgische Seenplatte
- Municipal assoc.: Stavenhagen
- Subdivisions: 3

Government
  - Mayor: Wolfgang Käsler

Area
  - Total: 14.20 km^{2} (5.48 sq mi)
- Elevation: 58 m (190 ft)

Population (2025-12-31)
  - Total: 309
  - Density: 21.8/km^{2} (56.4/sq mi)
- Time zone: UTC+01:00 (CET)
  - Summer (DST): UTC+02:00 (CEST)
- Postal codes: 17153
- Dialling codes: 039955
- Vehicle registration: DM
- Website: www.stavenhagen.de

Briggow is a municipality in the Mecklenburgische Seenplatte district, in Mecklenburg-Vorpommern, Germany.
