= Altenhagen =

- Municipality
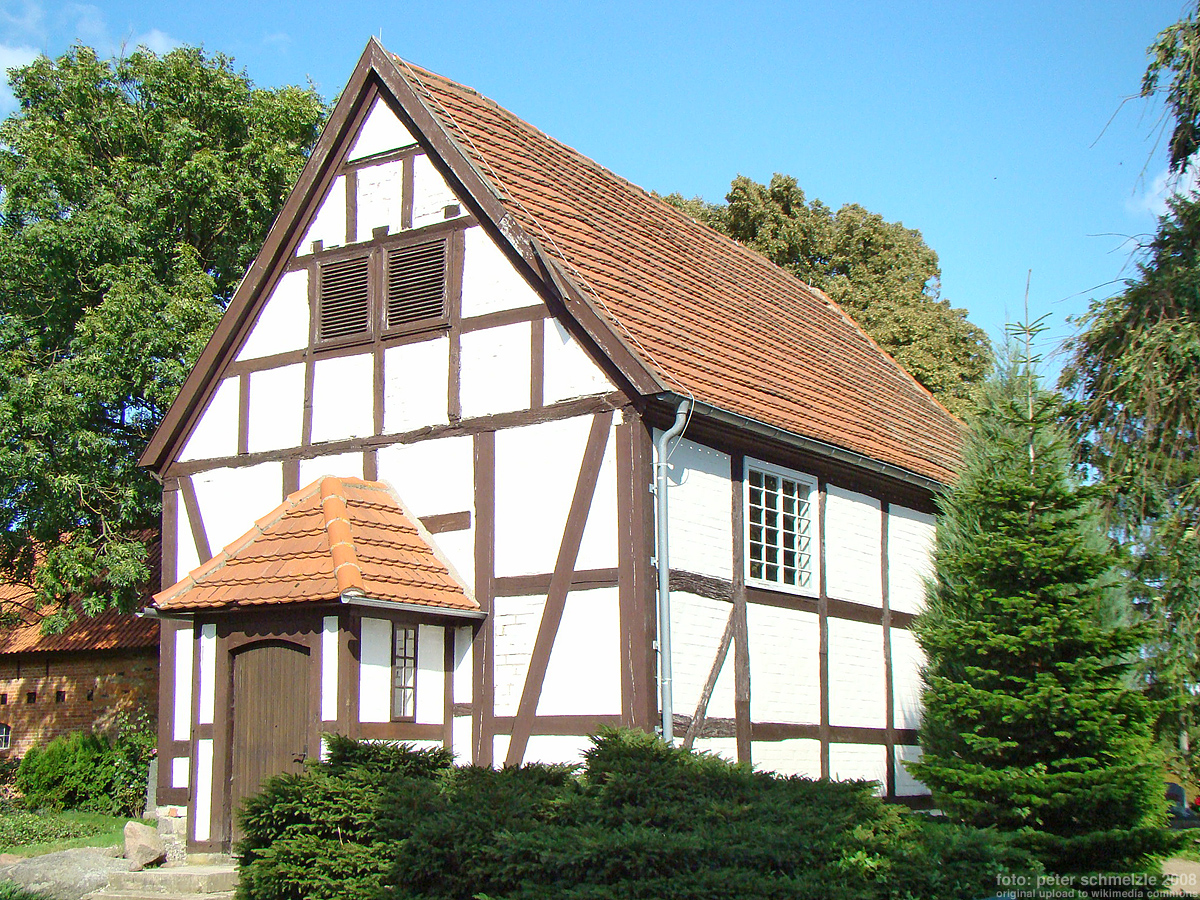
- The church of Altenhagen

- Location of Altenhagen within Mecklenburgische Seenplatte district
- Interactive map of Altenhagen
- Location within Germany Location within Mecklenburg-Vorpommern
- Coordinates: 53°46′N 13°07′E
- Country: Germany
- State: Mecklenburg-Vorpommern
- District: Mecklenburgische Seenplatte
- Municipal assoc.: Treptower Tollensewinkel
- Subdivisions: 3 Ortsteile

Government
  - Mayor: Marita Range

Area
  - Total: 11.05 km^{2} (4.27 sq mi)
- Elevation: 92 m (302 ft)

Population (2025-12-31)
  - Total: 300
  - Density: 27/km^{2} (70/sq mi)
- Time zone: UTC+01:00 (CET)
  - Summer (DST): UTC+02:00 (CEST)
- Postal codes: 17091
- Dialling codes: 039600
- Vehicle registration: DM
- Website: www.altentreptow.de

Altenhagen is a municipality in the Mecklenburgische Seenplatte district, in Mecklenburg-Vorpommern, Germany.

The church in the village of Altenhagen is a rectangular, timber-framed building without a tower, constructed as an emergency church in the second half of the 18th century, The building was renovated in 1993 and received some new furnishing.
