= Zettemin =

- Municipality
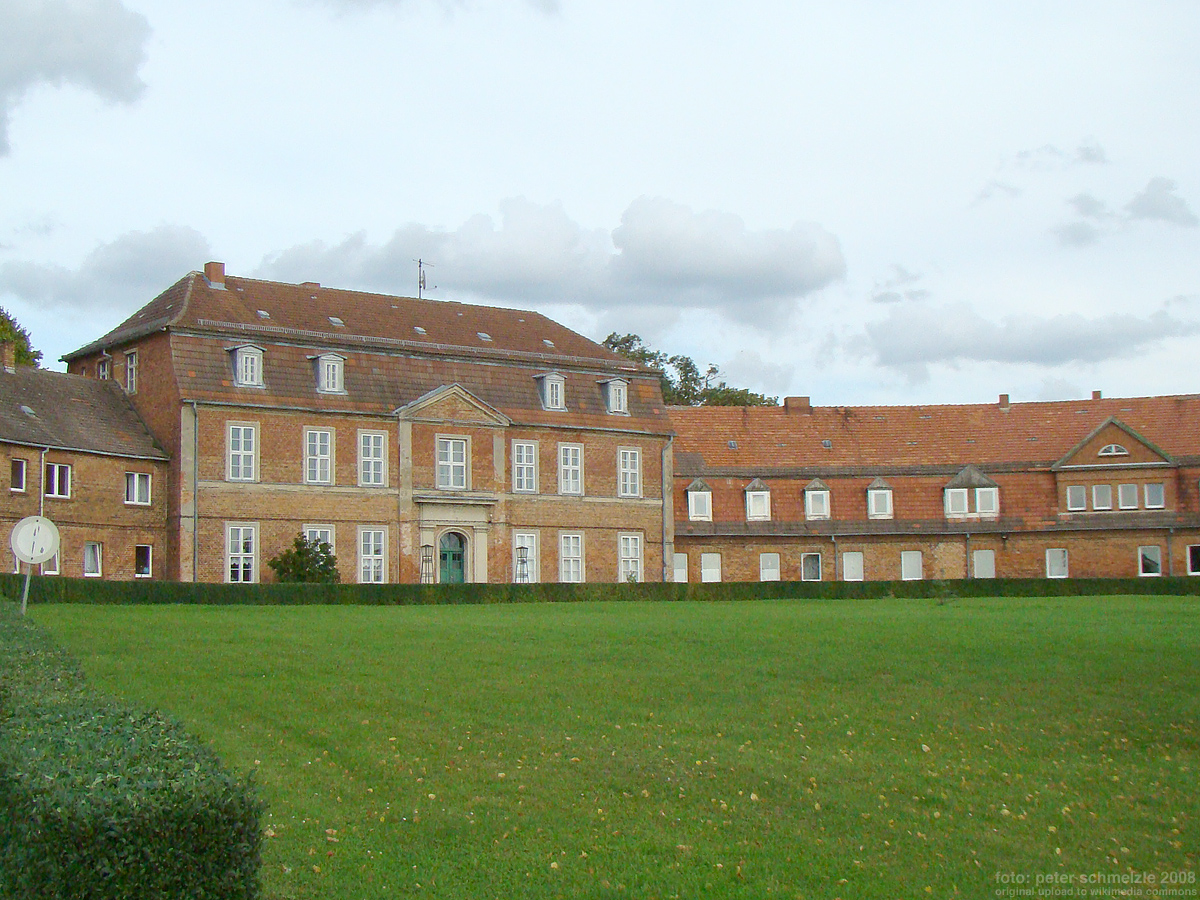
- Gutshaus Zettemin in Zettemin

- Location of Zettemin within Mecklenburgische Seenplatte district
- Interactive map of Zettemin
- Location within Germany Location within Mecklenburg-Vorpommern
- Coordinates: 53°39′N 12°50′E
- Country: Germany
- State: Mecklenburg-Vorpommern
- District: Mecklenburgische Seenplatte
- Municipal assoc.: Stavenhagen

Government
  - Mayor: Bodo Walter

Area
  - Total: 18.79 km^{2} (7.25 sq mi)
- Elevation: 38 m (125 ft)

Population (2025-12-31)
  - Total: 250
  - Density: 13/km^{2} (34/sq mi)
- Time zone: UTC+01:00 (CET)
  - Summer (DST): UTC+02:00 (CEST)
- Postal codes: 17153
- Dialling codes: 039951
- Vehicle registration: DM
- Website: www.stavenhagen.de

Zettemin is a municipality in the Mecklenburgische Seenplatte district, in Mecklenburg-Vorpommern, Germany.
