= Treptower Tollensewinkel =

Amt in Mecklenburg-Vorpommern, Germany

- Amt
- Map of Mecklenburgische Seenplatte highlighting Treptower Tollensewinkel
- Interactive map of Treptower Tollensewinkel
- Location within Germany Location within Mecklenburg-Vorpommern
- Coordinates: 53°47′N 13°15′E
- Country: Germany
- State: Mecklenburg-Vorpommern
- District: Mecklenburgische Seenplatte
- Seat: Altentreptow
- Subdivisions: 19 municipalities

Area
  - Total: 413.92 km^{2} (159.82 sq mi)

Population (2025-12-31)
  - Total: 12,571
  - Density: 30.371/km^{2} (78.660/sq mi)
- Time zone: UTC+01:00 (CET)
  - Summer (DST): UTC+02:00 (CEST)
- Website: www.altentreptow.de

Treptower Tollensewinkel (pronounced [tʁɛptoːɐ], with a silent w) is an Amt in the Mecklenburgische Seenplatte district, in Mecklenburg-Vorpommern, Germany. The seat of the Amt is in Altentreptow.

The Amt Treptower Tollensewinkel consists of the following municipalities:

1. Altenhagen
2. Altentreptow
3. Bartow
4. Breesen
5. Burow
6. Gnevkow
7. Golchen
8. Grapzow
9. Grischow
10. Groß Teetzleben
11. Gültz
12. Kriesow
13. Pripsleben
14. Röckwitz
15. Siedenbollentin
16. Tützpatz
17. Werder
18. Wildberg
19. Wolde
