= Röckwitz =

- Municipality
- Location of Röckwitz within Mecklenburgische Seenplatte district
- Interactive map of Röckwitz
- Location within Germany Location within Mecklenburg-Vorpommern
- Coordinates: 53°42′N 13°06′E
- Country: Germany
- State: Mecklenburg-Vorpommern
- District: Mecklenburgische Seenplatte
- Municipal assoc.: Treptower Tollensewinkel
- Subdivisions: 3

Government
  - Mayor: Manfred Komesker

Area
  - Total: 14.75 km^{2} (5.70 sq mi)
- Elevation: 71 m (233 ft)

Population (2025-12-31)
  - Total: 254
  - Density: 17.2/km^{2} (44.6/sq mi)
- Time zone: UTC+01:00 (CET)
  - Summer (DST): UTC+02:00 (CEST)
- Postal codes: 17091
- Dialling codes: 039600
- Vehicle registration: DM
- Website: www.altentreptow.de

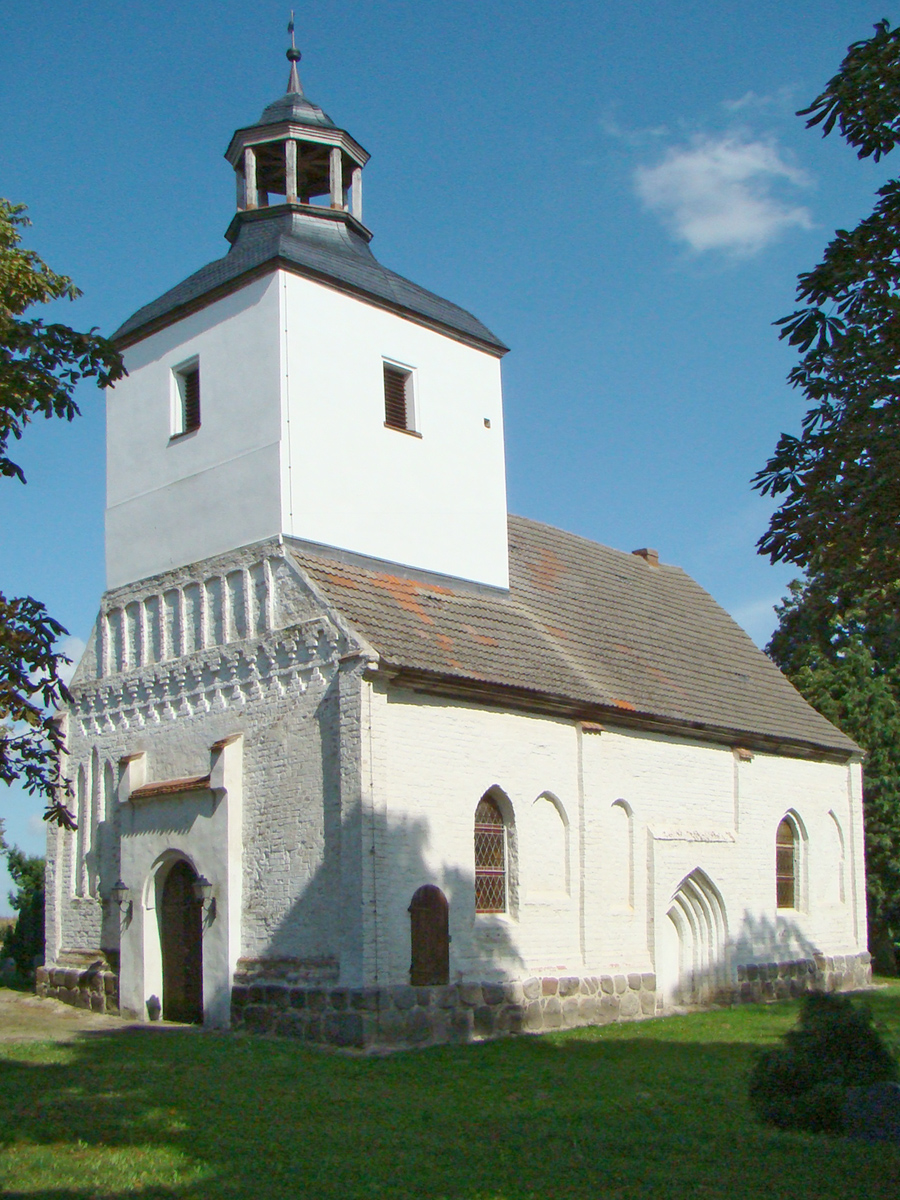
The Church in Röckwitz

Röckwitz is a municipality in the Mecklenburgische Seenplatte district, in Mecklenburg-Vorpommern, Germany.
