= Müritz (district) =

Coordinates: 53°25′N 12°42′E

- District
- Flag Coat of arms

- Country: Germany
- State: Mecklenburg-Western Pomerania
- Disbanded: 2011
- Capital: Waren

Area
  - Total: 1,713 km^{2} (661 sq mi)

Population (2010)
  - Total: 64,615
  - Density: 38/km^{2} (98/sq mi)
- Time zone: UTC+01:00 (CET)
  - Summer (DST): UTC+02:00 (CEST)
- Vehicle registration: MÜR
- Website: landkreis-mueritz.de

Müritz is a former Kreis (district) in the southern part of Mecklenburg-Vorpommern, Germany. It is named after the lake Müritz. Neighboring districts were (from the west clockwise) Parchim, Güstrow, Demmin, Mecklenburg-Strelitz, the district-free city Neubrandenburg and the district Ostprignitz-Ruppin in Brandenburg. The district was disbanded at the district reform of September 2011. Its territory has been part of the Mecklenburgische Seenplatte district since.

== Geography ==
The district of Müritz constituted roughly the western half of the Müritz lakeland and the Müritz National Park. The lake Müritz has an area of 117 km^{2}; it is the second largest lake of Germany after Lake Constance, and the largest lake entirely within the German borders.

== History ==
Müritz District was established on June 12, 1994, by merging the previous districts of Röbel and Waren; along with a few municipalities from the districts of Malchin and Neustrelitz. This district was merged with the district of Mecklenburg-Strelitz and most of the district of Demmin at the district reform of September 2011, forming the new Mecklenburgische Seenplatte district.

== Coat of arms ==
The coat of arms shows a bull head in the top left corner, symbolizing the Princes of Werle. The osprey to the right stands for the rich nature in the district. The city wall in the bottom with four tops stands for the four cities in the district, and the wavy lines in the city gate for the Müritz lake land.

== Towns and municipalities ==
The subdivisions of the district were (situation August 2011):

Amt-free town
1. Waren (Müritz)

Ämter
1. Malchow; 1. Alt Schwerin; 2. Fünfseen; 3. Göhren-Lebbin; 4. Malchow^{1, 2}; 5. Nossentiner Hütte; 6. Penkow; 7. Silz; 8. Walow; 9. Zislow; 2. Penzliner Land; 1. Ankershagen; 2. Krukow^{3}; 3. Lapitz^{3}; 4. Mallin^{3}; 5. Möllenhagen; 6. Penzlin^{1, 2}; 7. Puchow^{3}	3. Röbel-Müritz; 1. Altenhof; 2. Bollewick; 3. Buchholz; 4. Bütow; 5. Fincken; 6. Gotthun; 7. Grabow-Below; 8. Groß Kelle; 9. Kieve; 10. Lärz; 11. Leizen; 12. Ludorf; 13. Massow; 14. Melz; 15. Priborn; 16. Rechlin; 17. Röbel^{1, 2}; 18. Schwarz; 19. Sietow; 20. Stuer; 21. Vipperow; 22. Wredenhagen; 23. Zepkow	4. Seenlandschaft Waren [seat: Waren]; 1. Grabowhöfe; 2. Groß Dratow^{3}; 3. Groß Gievitz^{3}; 4. Groß Plasten; 5. Hinrichshagen^{3}; 6. Hohen Wangelin; 7. Jabel; 8. Kargow; 9. Klink; 10. Klocksin; 11. Lansen-Schönau^{3}; 12. Moltzow; 13. Neu Gaarz^{3}; 14. Schloen^{3}; 15. Schwinkendorf^{3}; 16. Torgelow am See; 17. Varchentin; 18. Vielist^{3}; 19. Vollrathsruhe
^{1} - seat of the Amt; ^{2} - town; ^{3} - former town/municipality
