= Müritz =

Body of water in Germany

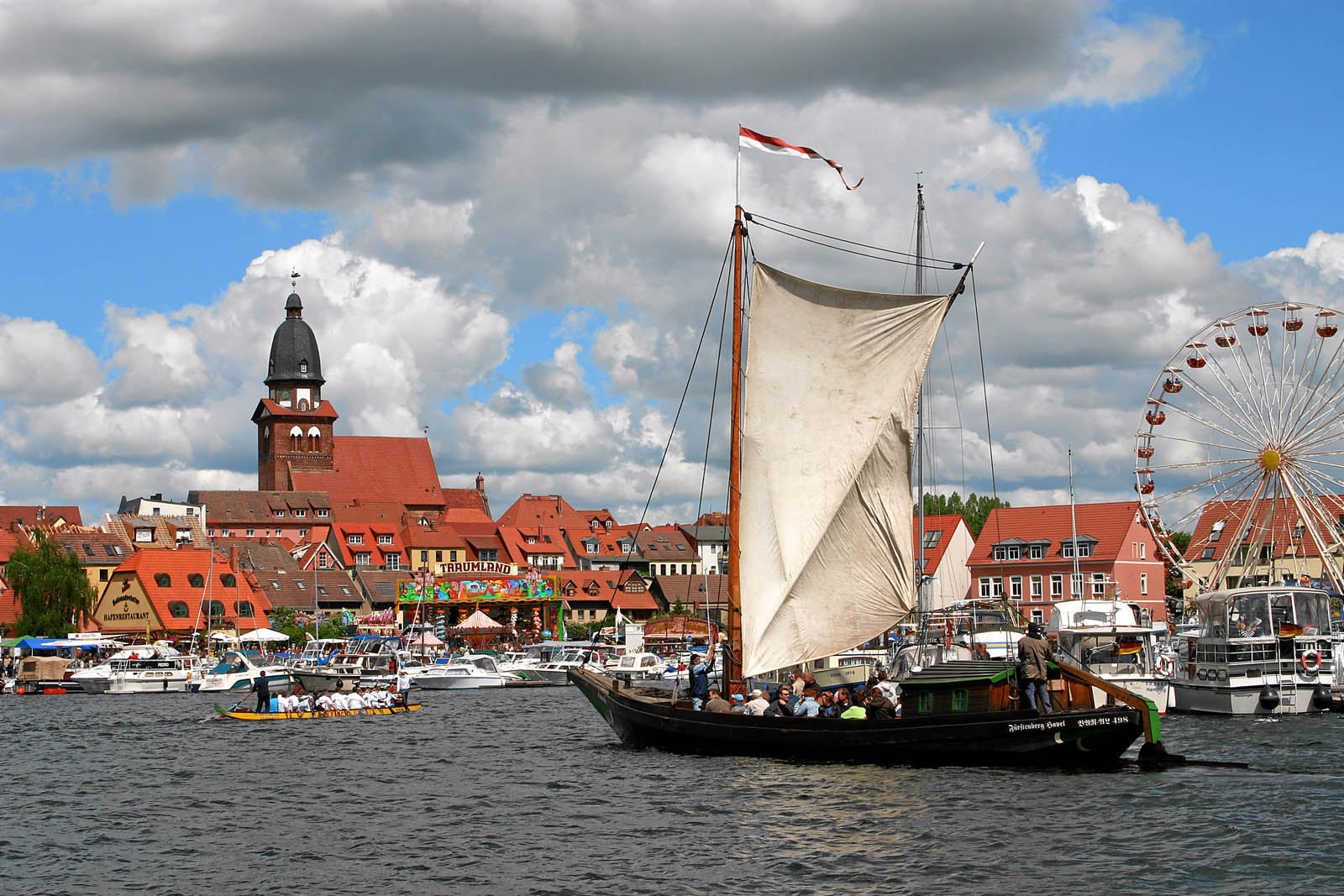
- Waren harbour during the Müritz Sail week

- Location within Germany Location within Mecklenburg-Vorpommern
- Location: Mecklenburgische Seenplatte, Mecklenburg-Vorpommern
- Coordinates: 53°25′N 12°41′E
- Type: mesotrophic
- Primary inflows: Elde
- Primary outflows: Elde
- Catchment area: 663 km^{2} (256 sq mi)
- Basin countries: Germany
- Surface area: 117 km^{2} (45 sq mi)
- Average depth: 6 m (20 ft)
- Max. depth: 31 m (102 ft)
- Residence time: 15 years (?)
- Surface elevation: 62 m (203 ft)
- Settlements: Waren, Röbel

The Müritz (German: [ˈmyːʁɪts]; from Slavic "little sea") is a lake in Mecklenburg-Vorpommern, northern Germany. Its area is 117 km^{2} (45 sq mi), which makes it the second largest lake in Germany (after Lake Constance) and the largest lake located entirely within German territory.

Its maximum depth is 31 metres (102 ft). It is fed and drained by the river Elde. Part of the Müritz and adjacent forests and wetlands are protected by the Müritz National Park. The former Müritz district was named after the lake. The biggest towns bordering the lake are Waren (Müritz) and Röbel, both major centres of tourism in the Mecklenburg Lake District.

Lake Müritz is part of the Müritz-Elde Waterway, a Class I federal waterway. It is managed by the Lauenburg Waterway and Shipping Authority (Wasser- und Schifffahrtsamt Lauenburg).

== Geography ==
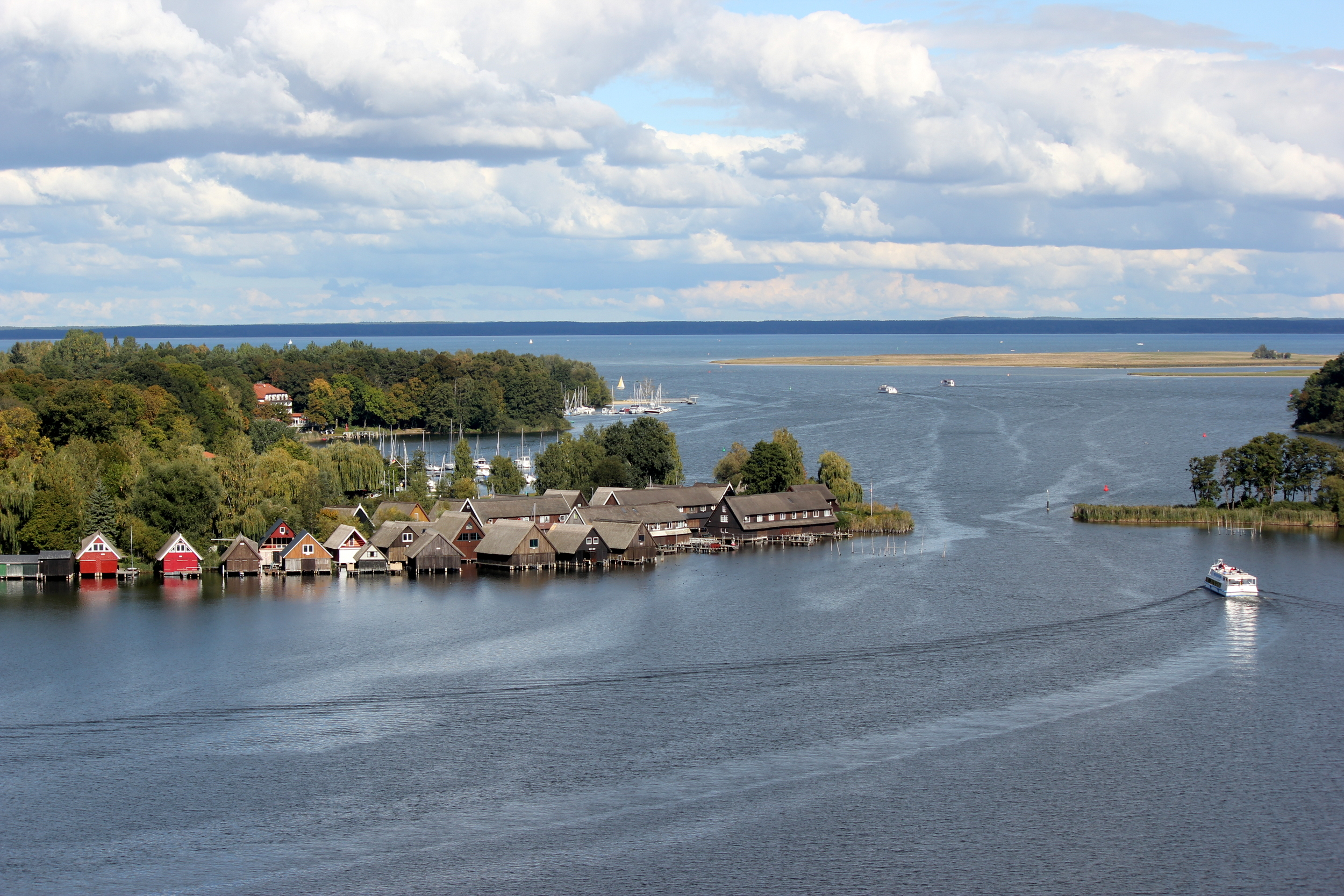
Lake Müritz in Röbel

=== Divisions ===
The Müritz Basin is divided into several large bays. Unlike the shallow eastern part of the lake, the western side is divided into several channel-like inlets like the Bays of Röbel and Sietow (Röbeler Bucht and Sietower Bucht). By the town of Waren on the northern shore of the lake is the Binnenmüritz, which contains the deepest point of the lake (−31 metres), and only has a narrow strait connecting it to the main basin of Lake Müritz. At the southern shore is the Little Müritz (Kleine Müritz) from which the Müritzarm and the Müritzsee branch off further to the south. Lake Müritz measures about 29 kilometres (18 mi) from north to south and about 13 kilometres (8 mi) from east to west; and has a catchment area of about 663 square kilometres (256 mi^{2}). The Müritz is crossed by the River Elde from south to north and has a link to the Kölpinsee in the west from the Binnenmüritz via the Reeck Canal (also Eldenburg Canal) which is a good two kilometres long. Because it also feeds the River Havel to the east via the Mirow Canal, which is part of the Müritz-Havel Waterway, and the Bolter Canal as well as via the chains of adjoining lakes, it has artificially been turned into a bifurcated waterway.

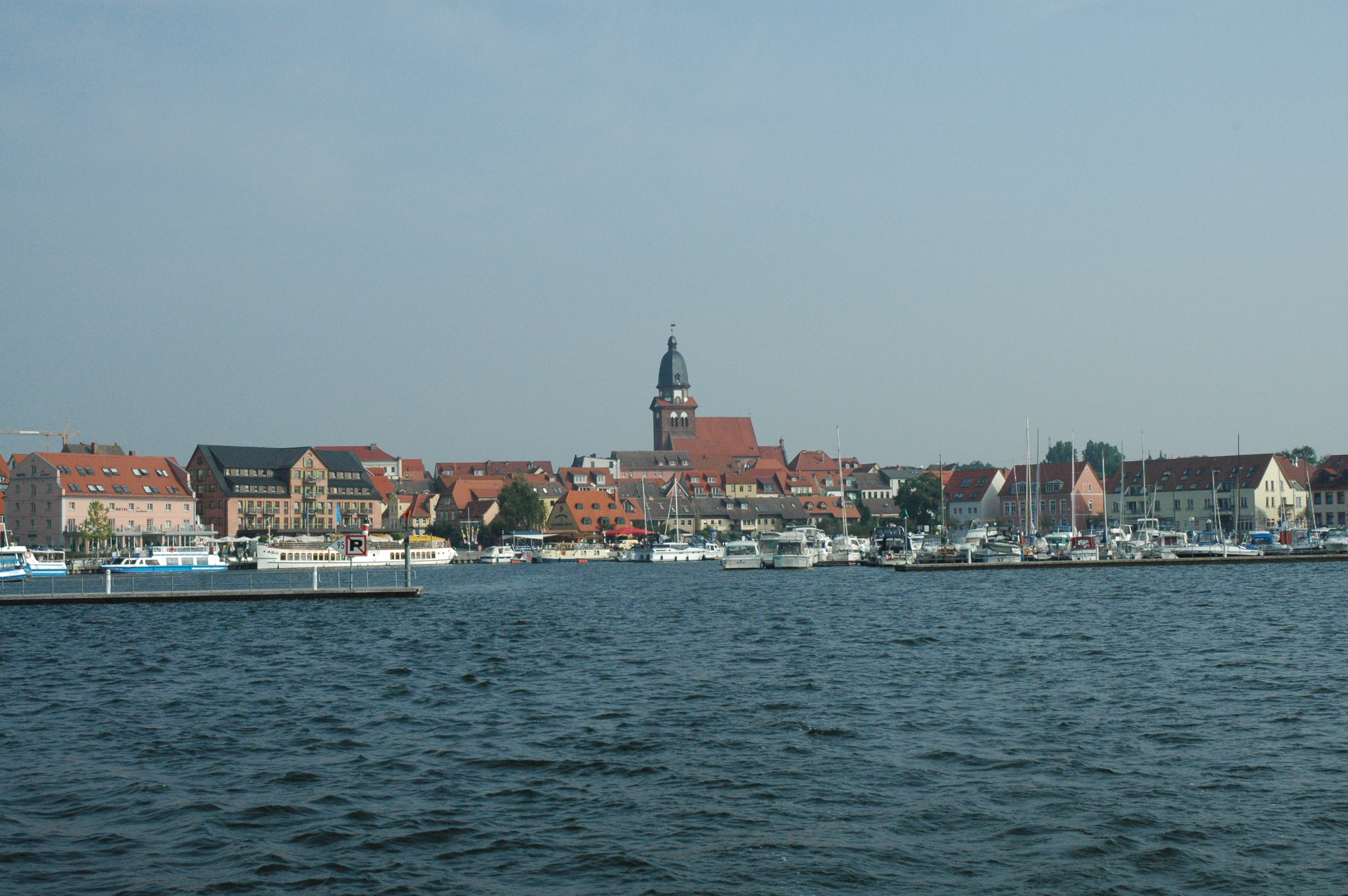
Waren's town harbour

=== Water level ===
The water level of Lake Müritz has changed several times in the preceding centuries, primarily as a result of human influences. In the 12th century the surface of the lake was still 60.5 metres (198 ft) above sea level. By 1737 the lake surface had risen to 64.35 metres (211.1 ft) as a result of the waterway being impounded in several positive and negative stages in order, for example, to drive mills along the River Elde downstream. But by 1739 the mill reservoir had been lowered by around 1.51 metres (5.0 ft). In the wake of two adjustments to the Elde and two further changes to the mill impoundment the water level reached its present level of 62 m above sea level (NN) in 1836.

== Creation ==
Lake Müritz was formed during the Weichselian glaciation between the Pomeranian and the Frankfurt Stages. Originally the entire Mecklenburg Lake District was a huge lake, that split into several smaller lakes, linked to one another, as a result of a fall in sea level.

== Settlements ==
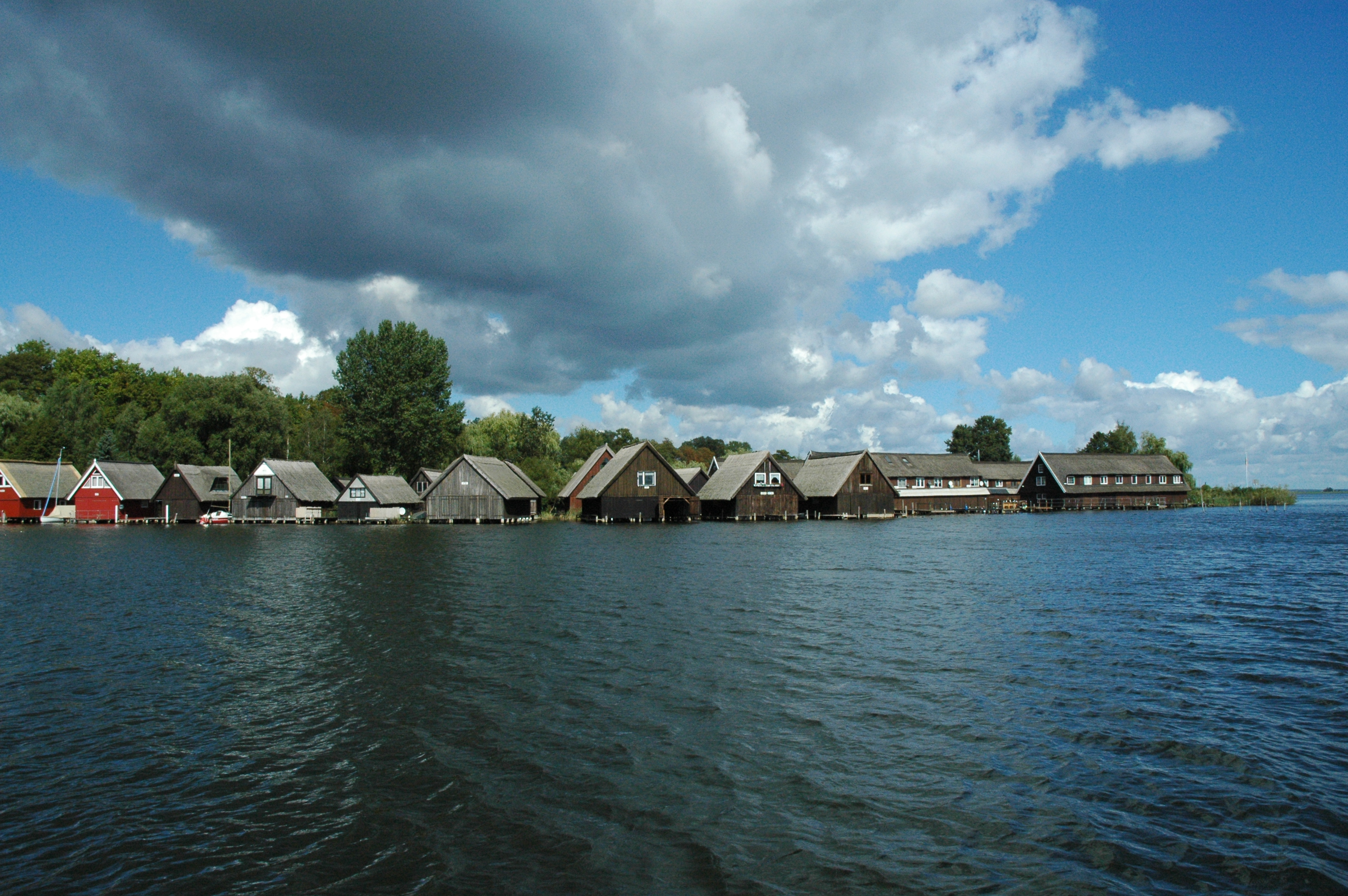
Boathouses in front of Röbel

The largest town on Lake Müritz is Waren (Müritz). Other settlements are (clockwise) Rechlin, Priborn, Vipperow, Ludorf, Röbel/Müritz, Gotthun, Sietow and Klink.
