= Alsophila jimeneziana =

Scientific classification
- Kingdom: Plantae
- Clade: Tracheophytes
- Division: Polypodiophyta
- Class: Polypodiopsida
- Order: Cyatheales
- Family: Cyatheaceae
- Genus: Alsophila
- Species: A. jimeneziana

Binomial name
- Alsophila jimeneziana D.S.Conant

Synonyms
- Cyathea crassa Maxon; Cyathea domingensis Brause; Nephelea crassa (Maxon) R.M.Tryon

Species of fern

Alsophila jimeneziana, synonym Cyathea crassa, is a species of tree fern endemic to the Dominican Republic. Little is known about this rare tree fern.

A. jimeneziana is part of the Alsophila woodwardioides complex from the Greater Antilles, together with five other species: Alsophila fulgens, Alsophila grevilleana, Alsophila portoricensis, and Alsophila tussacii (all also placed in Cyathea).

This species is not conspecific with Alsophila crassa Karsten, which is based on material collected from wet, cold, montane forest at Mérida by Franz Engel in 1859. The Checklist of Ferns and Lycophytes of the World considers it to be a synonym of Cyathea clandestina. Because the specific epithet crassa is unavailable for this tree fern if placed in the genus Alsophila, having already been used by Karsten, David Conant published the replacement name Alsophila jimeneziana in 1983.
