= Julius Runge =

German landscape painter

Julius Ludwig Friedrich Runge (28 June 1843, Röbel – 14 March 1922, Lindau) was a German landscape painter. Born in Röbel in northern Germany, he studied under Hans Gude and Gustav Schönleber. He painted in Munich, Karlsruhe, Hamburg and Lindau. In the early 1880s, he joined the Skagen Painters in the far north of Jutland together with his Swedish tutor Wilhelm von Gegerfelt and his French colleague Émile Barau.
