= Alsophila balanocarpa =

Scientific classification
- Kingdom: Plantae
- Clade: Tracheophytes
- Division: Polypodiophyta
- Class: Polypodiopsida
- Order: Cyatheales
- Family: Cyatheaceae
- Genus: Alsophila
- Species: A. balanocarpa

Binomial name
- Alsophila balanocarpa (D.C.Eaton) D.S.Conant

Synonyms
- Cyathea balanocarpa D.C.Eaton; Nephelea balanocarpa (D.C.Eaton) R.M.Tryon

Species of fern

Alsophila balanocarpa, synonym Cyathea balanocarpa, is a species of tree fern native to Cuba, Jamaica and Hispaniola. Despite its wide distribution, little is known about this species. It is apparently of hybrid origin.

In southeastern Cuba it hybridises with Alsophila woodwardioides to form the natural hybrid Alsophila × boytelii.
