= Alsophila grevilleana =

Scientific classification
- Kingdom: Plantae
- Clade: Tracheophytes
- Division: Polypodiophyta
- Class: Polypodiopsida
- Order: Cyatheales
- Family: Cyatheaceae
- Genus: Alsophila
- Species: A. grevilleana

Binomial name
- Alsophila grevilleana (Mart.) D.S.Conant

Synonyms
- Cyathea arborea var. pallida Hook.; Cyathea elegans Heward; Cyathea grevilleana Mart.; Disphenia grevilleana (Mart.) Kunze; Nephelea grevilleana (Mart.) R.M.Tryon

Species of fern

Alsophila grevilleana, synonym Cyathea grevilleana, is a species of tree fern endemic to Jamaica, where it grows in moist gullies and on wooded hills in both calcareous and noncalcareous soils at an altitude of 200–1200 m. The trunk of this plant is erect, about 7 m tall, and 10–15 cm in diameter. It is characteristically clothed in old stipe bases, brown scales and blackish spines. Fronds are tripinnate, dark green in colour, and up to 4 m in length. The last pinnae are sometimes separated, forming a distinctive clump around the trunk apex. The rachis is yellow-brown and almost smooth. This species has a long, dark brown stipe with a few scattered spines. Sori are produced in four to six pairs along the pinnule midvein. They are protected by pale brown indusia that are cup-like in appearance.

A. grevilleana forms part of the complex centered on Alsophila woodwardioides comprising six very similar taxa from the Greater Antilles. The other five species are Alsophila jimeneziana (syn. Cyathea crassa), Alsophila fulgens, Alsophila portoricensis and Alsophila tussacii. Large and Braggins (2004) note that this group is known to cross with members of the Alsophila minor complex.

The specific epithet grevilleana commemorates Robert Kaye Greville (1794-1866), who collected the type specimen in Jamaica in 1832.
