= Alsophila hotteana =

Scientific classification
- Kingdom: Plantae
- Clade: Tracheophytes
- Division: Polypodiophyta
- Class: Polypodiopsida
- Order: Cyatheales
- Family: Cyatheaceae
- Genus: Alsophila
- Species: A. hotteana

Binomial name
- Alsophila hotteana (C.Chr. & Ekman) R.M.Tryon

Synonyms
- Cyathea hotteana C.Chr. & Ekman

Species of plant

Alsophila hotteana, synonym Cyathea hotteana, is a species of tree fern endemic to Haiti, where it grows in cloud forest at an altitude of 1000–1200 m. The trunk of this plant is erect, up to 2 m tall, and approximately 8 cm in diameter. Fronds are pinnate and may reach 2 m in length. Brown basal scales cover the rachis and stipe, which are also brown. Sori are borne in two rows, one on each side of the pinnule midvein. They are covered by shallow, plate-like indusia, which bear one or two clefts at the margin.

A. hotteana was once abundant at lower altitudes. Indeed, the type material was collected at 700 m above sea level. However, forest clearance in recent decades has limited the altitudinal distribution of this species to higher elevations.

A. hotteana appears to be related to Alsophila brooksii, Alsophila bryophila and Alsophila minor.
