= Alsophila bryophila =

Scientific classification
- Kingdom: Plantae
- Clade: Tracheophytes
- Division: Polypodiophyta
- Class: Polypodiopsida
- Order: Cyatheales
- Family: Cyatheaceae
- Genus: Alsophila
- Species: A. bryophila

Binomial name
- Alsophila bryophila R.M.Tryon

Synonyms
- Cyathea bryophila (R.M.Tryon) Proctor

Species of plant

Alsophila bryophila, synonym Cyathea bryophila, is a species of tree fern native to Puerto Rico, where it grows in the understory in wet montane and mossy forest at an altitude of 750–1200 m. The trunk is erect, up to 7 m tall and about 10 cm in diameter. Fronds are pinnate or bipinnate and grow to 2 m in length. The underside of the rachis is pubescent and has occasional scales towards the base. The scales range in colour from brown to bicoloured (pale with brown margins). Sori occur along each side of the pinnule midvein and are covered by scale-like indusia. A. bryophila is a slow growing species, reportedly only increasing in trunk height by 5 cm a year, a growth rate more akin to that of Dicksonia species. It has been estimated that plants may live in excess of 150 years.

The closest relatives of A. bryophila appear to be Alsophila brooksii, Alsophila hotteana and Alsophila minor.

The specific epithet bryophila, meaning "bryophyte loving", refers to the fact that this species is commonly encountered in mossy forest.

A. bryophila may be cultivated, although it requires consistently cool and moist conditions to do well. It is apparently more susceptible to insect damage than most other species. In the horticultural trade, A. bryophila is often erroneously called "Cyathea pubescens", although this is a synonym of an unrelated species (Alsophila auneae).
