= Jaebetz =

- Ortsteil of Fincken
- Interactive map of Jaebetz
- Location within Germany Location within Mecklenburg-Vorpommern
- Coordinates: 53°19′N 12°22′E
- Country: Germany
- State: Mecklenburg-Vorpommern
- District: Mecklenburgische Seenplatte
- Municipality: Fincken

Area
  - Total: 13.02 km^{2} (5.03 sq mi)
- Elevation: 76 m (249 ft)

Population (2006-12-31)
  - Total: 173
  - Density: 13.3/km^{2} (34.4/sq mi)
- Time zone: UTC+01:00 (CET)
  - Summer (DST): UTC+02:00 (CEST)
- Postal codes: 17209
- Dialling codes: 039924
- Vehicle registration: MÜR
- Website: www.amt-roebel-mueritz.de

Jaebetz is a village and a former municipality in the Mecklenburgische Seenplatte district, in Mecklenburg-Vorpommern, Germany. Since 1 January 2010, it is part of the municipality Fincken.
