= Alsophila × boytelii =

Scientific classification
- Kingdom: Plantae
- Clade: Tracheophytes
- Division: Polypodiophyta
- Class: Polypodiopsida
- Order: Cyatheales
- Family: Cyatheaceae
- Genus: Alsophila
- Species: A. × boytelii

Binomial name
- Alsophila × boytelii Caluff & Shelton

Species of tree fern

Alsophila × boytelii is a tree fern endemic to the Sierra Maestra range of southeastern Cuba. It is a natural interspecific hybrid between Alsophila balanocarpa and Alsophila woodwardioides. The spores of A. × boytelii are normal in appearance; Caluff and Serrano (2002) suggest that it might therefore be fertile. This theory is strengthened by the presence of a large population of A. × boytelii in the Gran Piedra area. Caluff and Serrano (2002) note that "a full range of intermediates linking this hybrid with its parent species suggests the occurrence of backcrossing".

The type material was collected in Reserva Gran Piedra, Santiago de Cuba Province at an altitude of 1000 m on November 18, 1983.

The specific epithet boytelii honours the late Fernando Boytel Jambú of Cuba.
