= Alsophila fulgens =

Scientific classification
- Kingdom: Plantae
- Clade: Tracheophytes
- Division: Polypodiophyta
- Class: Polypodiopsida
- Order: Cyatheales
- Family: Cyatheaceae
- Genus: Alsophila
- Species: A. fulgens

Binomial name
- Alsophila fulgens (C.Chr.) D.S.Conant

Synonyms
- Cyathea fulgens C.Chr.; Nephelea fulgens (C.Chr.) Gastony

Species of fern

Alsophila fulgens, synonym Cyathea fulgens, is a species of tree fern endemic to the Dominican Republic on the island of Hispaniola. It forms part of the complex centered on Alsophila woodwardioides comprising six very similar taxa from the Greater Antilles. The other five species are Alsophila jimeneziana (syn. Cyathea crassa), Alsophila grevilleana, Alsophila portoricensis and Alsophila tussacii. Large and Braggins (2004) note that this group is known to cross with members of the Alsophila minor complex. In the wild, A. fulgens also forms hybrids with Alsophila brooksii.
