= Bütow =

- Municipality
- Location of Bütow within Mecklenburgische Seenplatte district
- Interactive map of Bütow
- Location within Germany Location within Mecklenburg-Vorpommern
- Coordinates: 53°21′N 12°29′E
- Country: Germany
- State: Mecklenburg-Vorpommern
- District: Mecklenburgische Seenplatte
- Municipal assoc.: Röbel-Müritz

Government
  - Mayor: Siegfried Haustein

Area
  - Total: 26.32 km^{2} (10.16 sq mi)
- Elevation: 78 m (256 ft)

Population (2025-12-31)
  - Total: 460
  - Density: 17/km^{2} (45/sq mi)
- Time zone: UTC+01:00 (CET)
  - Summer (DST): UTC+02:00 (CEST)
- Postal codes: 17209
- Dialling codes: 039922
- Vehicle registration: MÜR
- Website: www.amt-roebel-mueritz.de

Bütow is a municipality in the Mecklenburgische Seenplatte district, in Mecklenburg-Vorpommern, Germany.

== Geography ==
Bütow is located in the Mecklenburg Lake Plateau, to the east of the source of the Elde river. It is a hilly area, with the highest point 101 m (331 ft) above sea level.

Church ruin in Bütow-Dambeck

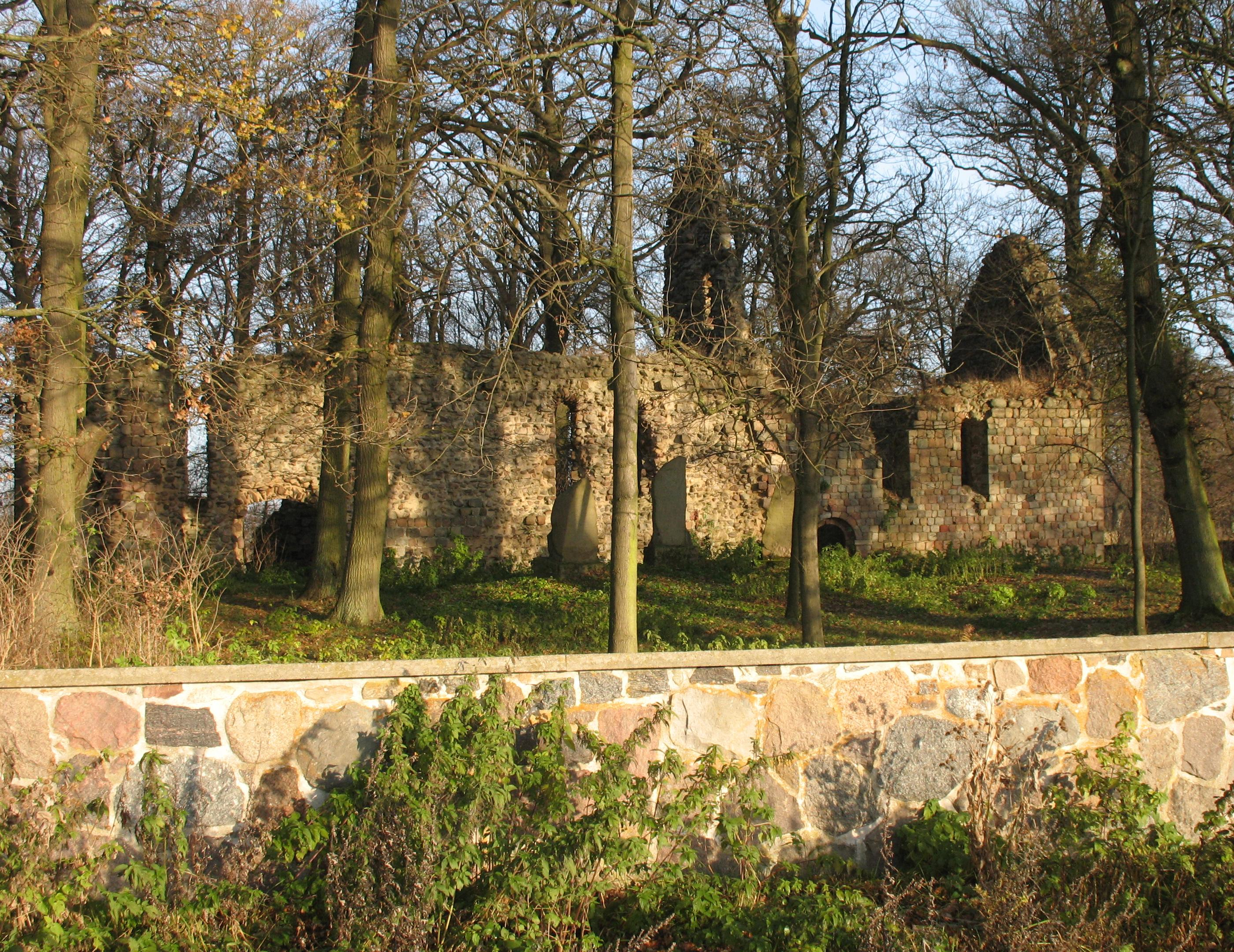

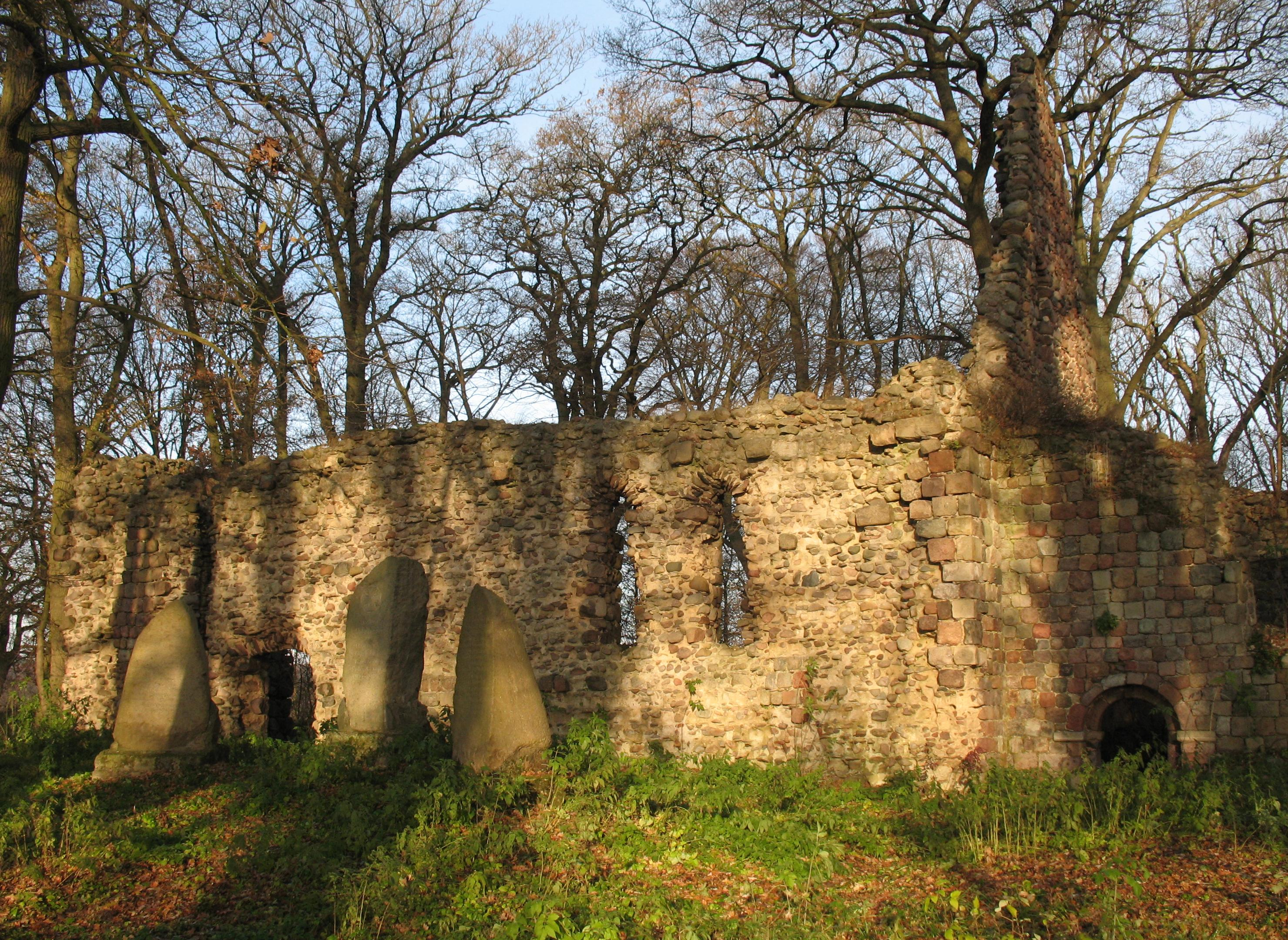
Nave

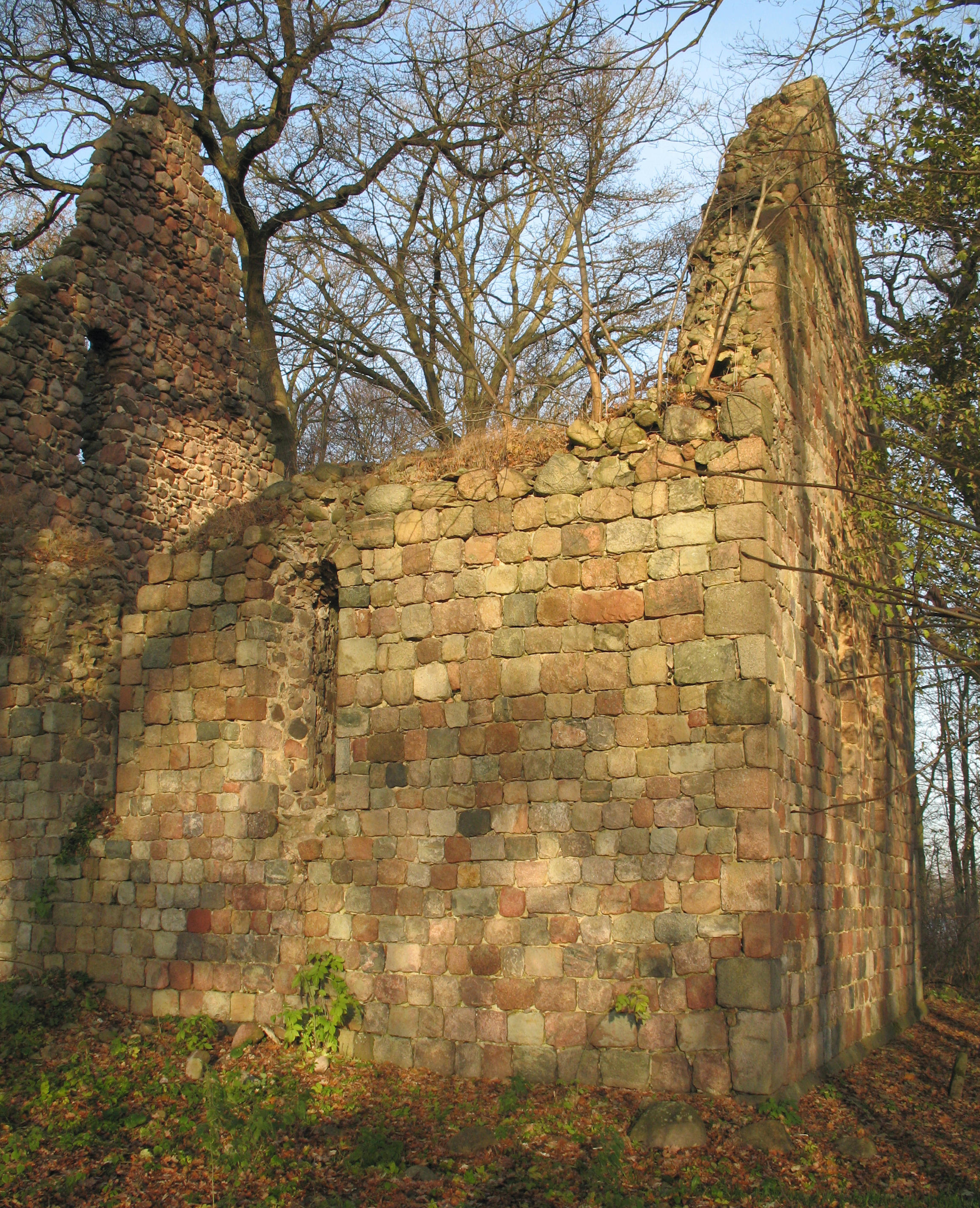
Choir

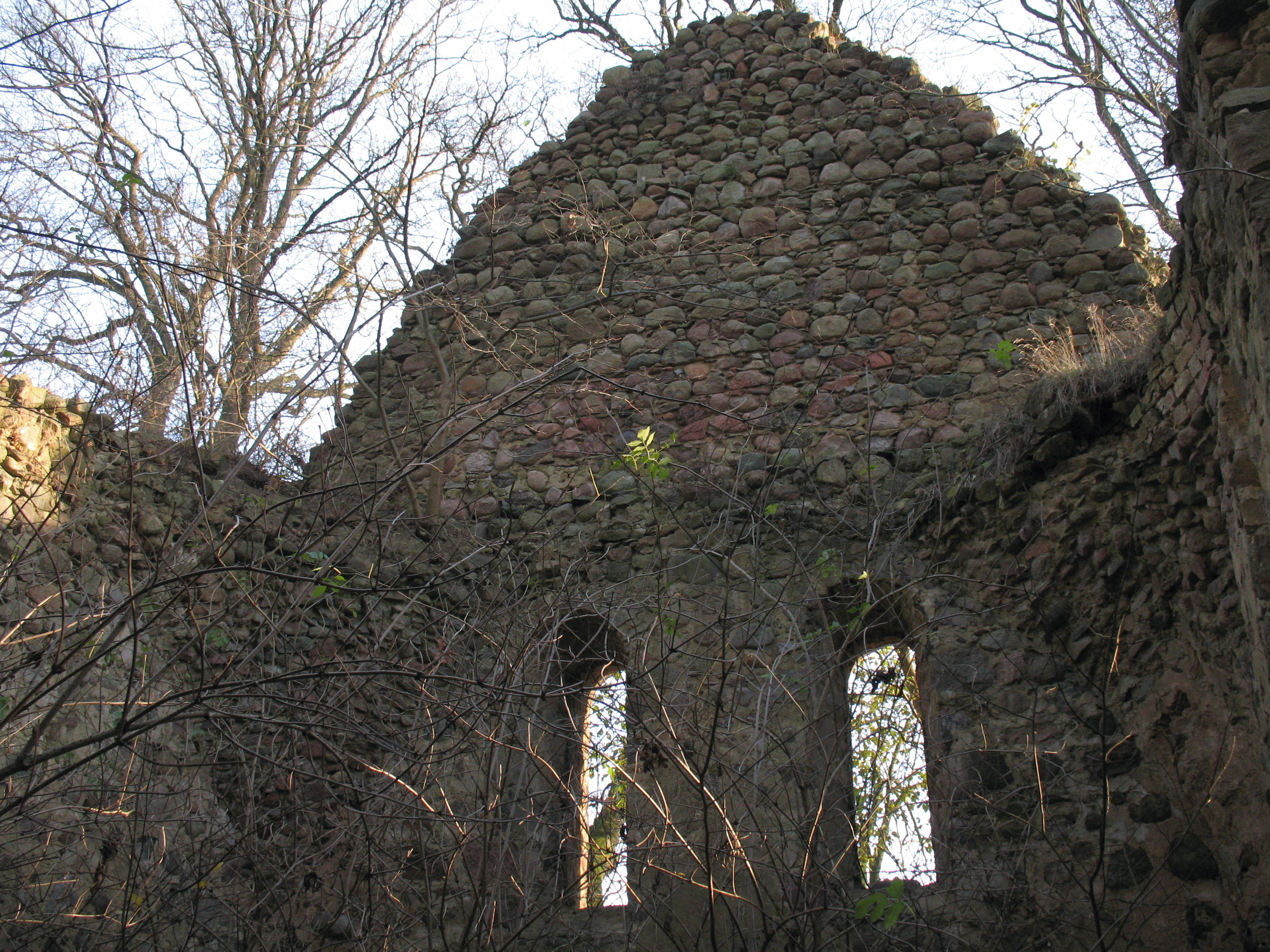
Gable

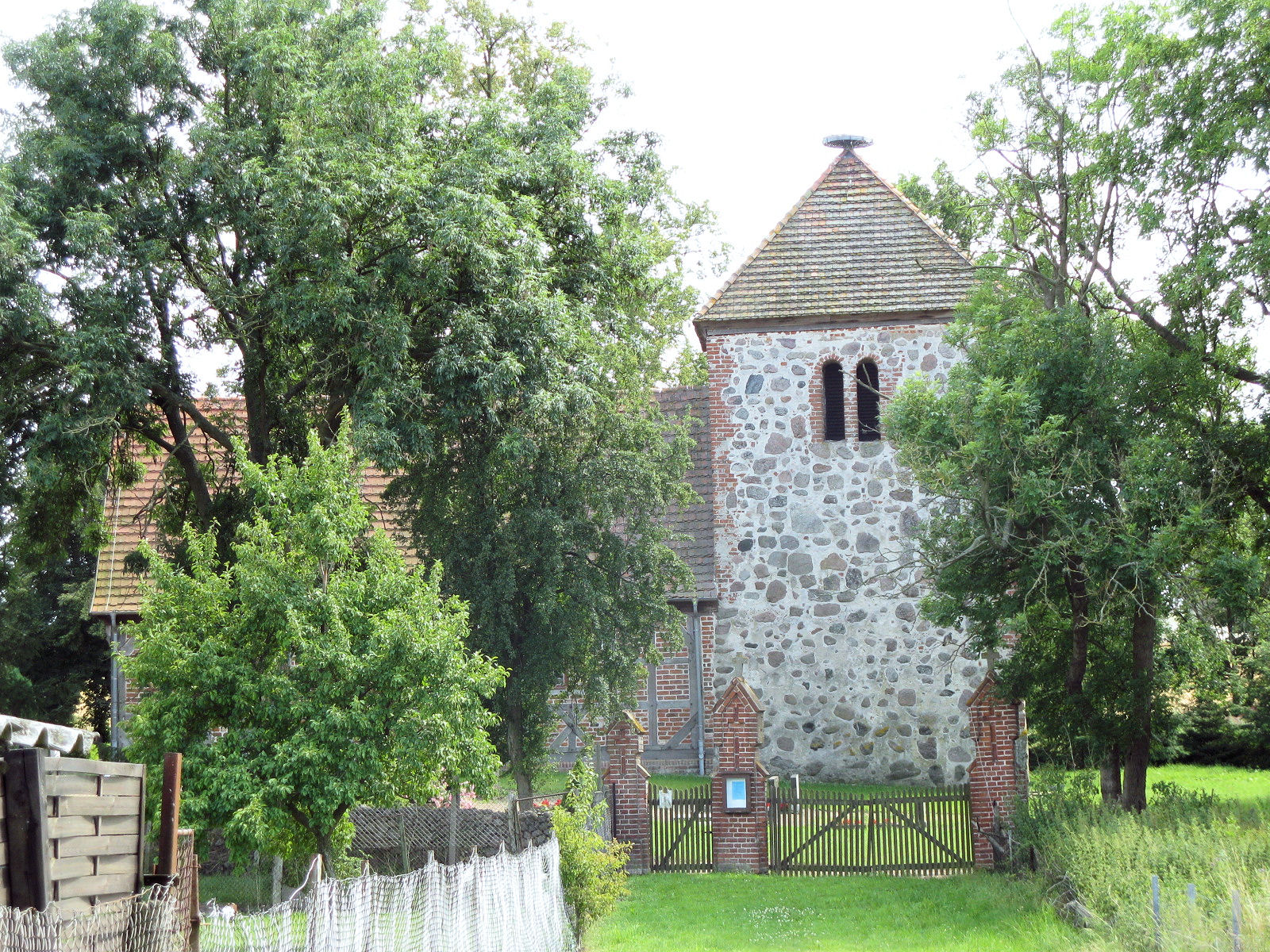
Village church in Bütow.

== Transportation ==
Bütow is located about two kilometers away from the federal highway B 198. The Autobahn 19 Berlin - Rostock is about three kilometers away. The nearest railway station is located in Malchow.
