= Altenhof, Mecklenburg-Vorpommern =

Altenhof
- Municipality
- Location of Altenhof within Mecklenburgische Seenplatte district
- Interactive map of Altenhof
- Location within Germany Location within Mecklenburg-Vorpommern
- Coordinates: 53°21′N 12°21′E
- Country: Germany
- State: Mecklenburg-Vorpommern
- District: Mecklenburgische Seenplatte
- Municipal assoc.: Röbel-Müritz

Government
  - Mayor: Bianca Preidel

Area
  - Total: 16.63 km^{2} (6.42 sq mi)
- Elevation: 82 m (269 ft)

Population (2025-12-31)
  - Total: 315
  - Density: 18.9/km^{2} (49.1/sq mi)
- Time zone: UTC+01:00 (CET)
  - Summer (DST): UTC+02:00 (CEST)
- Postal codes: 17209
- Dialling codes: 039924
- Vehicle registration: MÜR
- Website: www.amt-roebel-mueritz.de

Altenhof (German pronunciation: [ˈaltn̩hoːf]) is a municipality in the Mecklenburgische Seenplatte district, in Mecklenburg-Vorpommern, Germany.
