= Melz =

- Municipality
- Location of Melz within Mecklenburgische Seenplatte district
- Interactive map of Melz
- Location within Germany Location within Mecklenburg-Vorpommern
- Coordinates: 53°18′08″N 12°37′07″E
- Country: Germany
- State: Mecklenburg-Vorpommern
- District: Mecklenburgische Seenplatte
- Municipal assoc.: Röbel-Müritz

Government
  - Mayor: Gudrun Drochner

Area
  - Total: 17.94 km^{2} (6.93 sq mi)
- Elevation: 68 m (223 ft)

Population (2025-12-31)
  - Total: 298
  - Density: 16.6/km^{2} (43.0/sq mi)
- Time zone: UTC+01:00 (CET)
  - Summer (DST): UTC+02:00 (CEST)
- Postal codes: 17209
- Dialling codes: 039923
- Vehicle registration: MÜR
- Website: www.amt-roebel- mueritz.de

Melz is a municipality in the Mecklenburgische Seenplatte district, in Mecklenburg-Vorpommern, Germany.
