= Schwarz, Germany =

Schwarz
- Municipality
- Location of Schwarz within Mecklenburgische Seenplatte district
- Interactive map of Schwarz
- Location within Germany Location within Mecklenburg-Vorpommern
- Coordinates: 53°13′11″N 12°46′59″E
- Country: Germany
- State: Mecklenburg-Vorpommern
- District: Mecklenburgische Seenplatte
- Municipal assoc.: Röbel-Müritz

Government
  - Mayor: Christian Stehlmann

Area
  - Total: 26.42 km^{2} (10.20 sq mi)
- Elevation: 57 m (187 ft)

Population (2025-12-31)
  - Total: 337
  - Density: 12.8/km^{2} (33.0/sq mi)
- Time zone: UTC+01:00 (CET)
  - Summer (DST): UTC+02:00 (CEST)
- Postal codes: 17252
- Dialling codes: 039827
- Vehicle registration: MÜR
- Website: www.amt-roebel- mueritz.de

Schwarz (German pronunciation: [ʃvaʁts]) is a municipality in the Mecklenburgische Seenplatte district, in Mecklenburg-Vorpommern, Germany.
