= Kieve, Müritz =

- Municipality
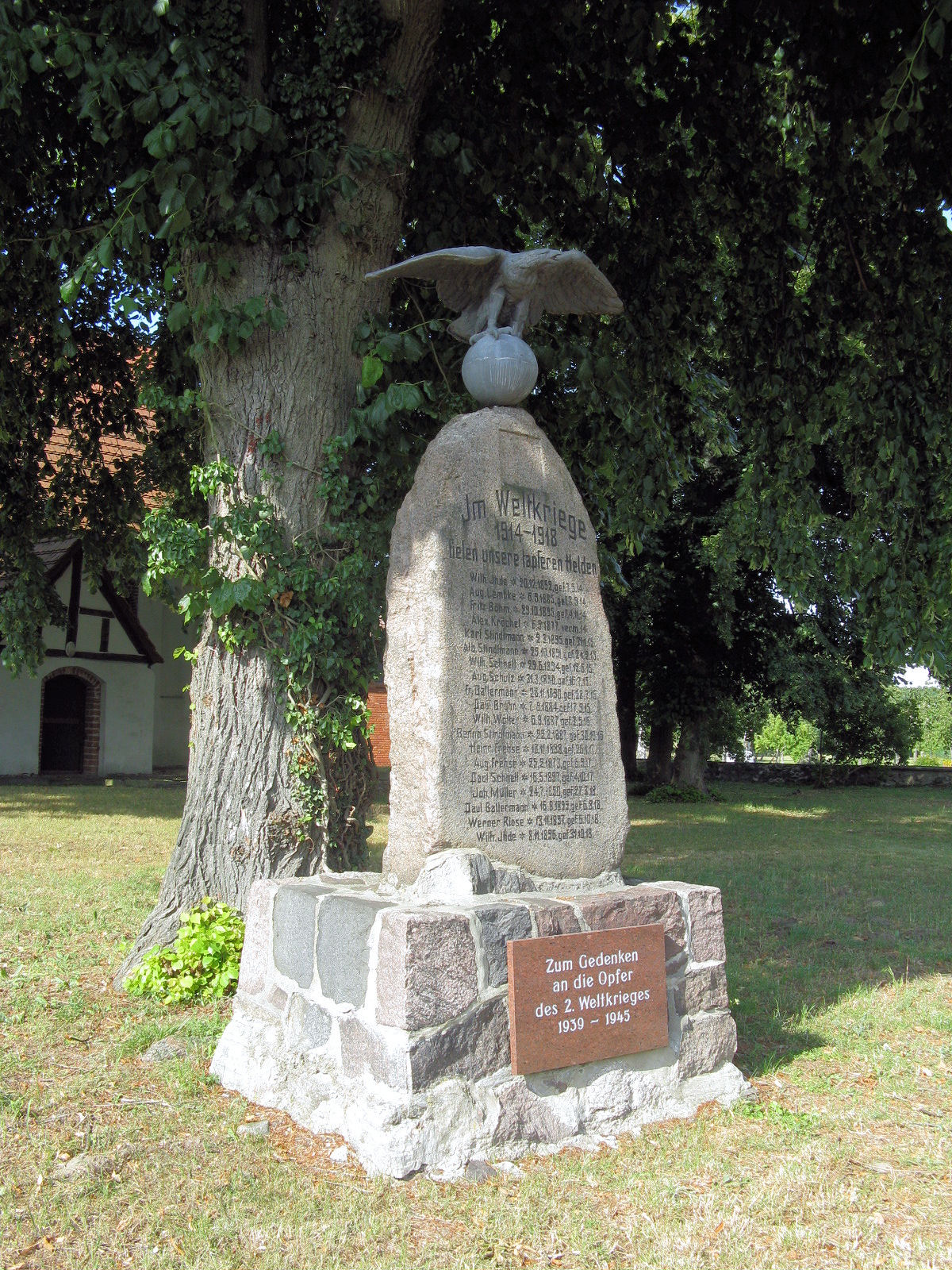
- World War I memorial in Kieve

- Location of Kieve, Müritz within Mecklenburgische Seenplatte district
- Interactive map of Kieve, Müritz
- Location within Germany Location within Mecklenburg-Vorpommern
- Coordinates: 53°16′36″N 12°35′35″E
- Country: Germany
- State: Mecklenburg-Vorpommern
- District: Mecklenburgische Seenplatte
- Municipal assoc.: Röbel-Müritz

Government
  - Mayor: Albrecht Wolter

Area
  - Total: 15.30 km^{2} (5.91 sq mi)
- Elevation: 67 m (220 ft)

Population (2025-12-31)
  - Total: 127
  - Density: 8.30/km^{2} (21.5/sq mi)
- Time zone: UTC+01:00 (CET)
  - Summer (DST): UTC+02:00 (CEST)
- Postal codes: 17209
- Dialling codes: 039925
- Vehicle registration: MÜR
- Website: www.amt-roebel-mueritz.de

Kieve (German pronunciation: [ˈkiːvə]) is a municipality in the Mecklenburgische Seenplatte district, in Mecklenburg-Vorpommern, Germany.
