= Groß Kelle =

- Municipality
- Location of Groß Kelle within Mecklenburgische Seenplatte district
- Interactive map of Groß Kelle
- Location within Germany Location within Mecklenburg-Vorpommern
- Coordinates: 53°24′11″N 12°33′00″E
- Country: Germany
- State: Mecklenburg-Vorpommern
- District: Mecklenburgische Seenplatte
- Municipal assoc.: Röbel-Müritz

Government
  - Mayor: Axel Krüger

Area
  - Total: 6.68 km^{2} (2.58 sq mi)
- Elevation: 80 m (260 ft)

Population (2025-12-31)
  - Total: 107
  - Density: 16.0/km^{2} (41.5/sq mi)
- Time zone: UTC+01:00 (CET)
  - Summer (DST): UTC+02:00 (CEST)
- Postal codes: 17207
- Dialling codes: 039931
- Vehicle registration: MÜR
- Website: www.amt-roebel-mueritz.de

Groß Kelle is a municipality in the Mecklenburgische Seenplatte district, in Mecklenburg-Vorpommern, Germany.
