= Röbel =

Town in Mecklenburg-Vorpommern, Germany

- Town
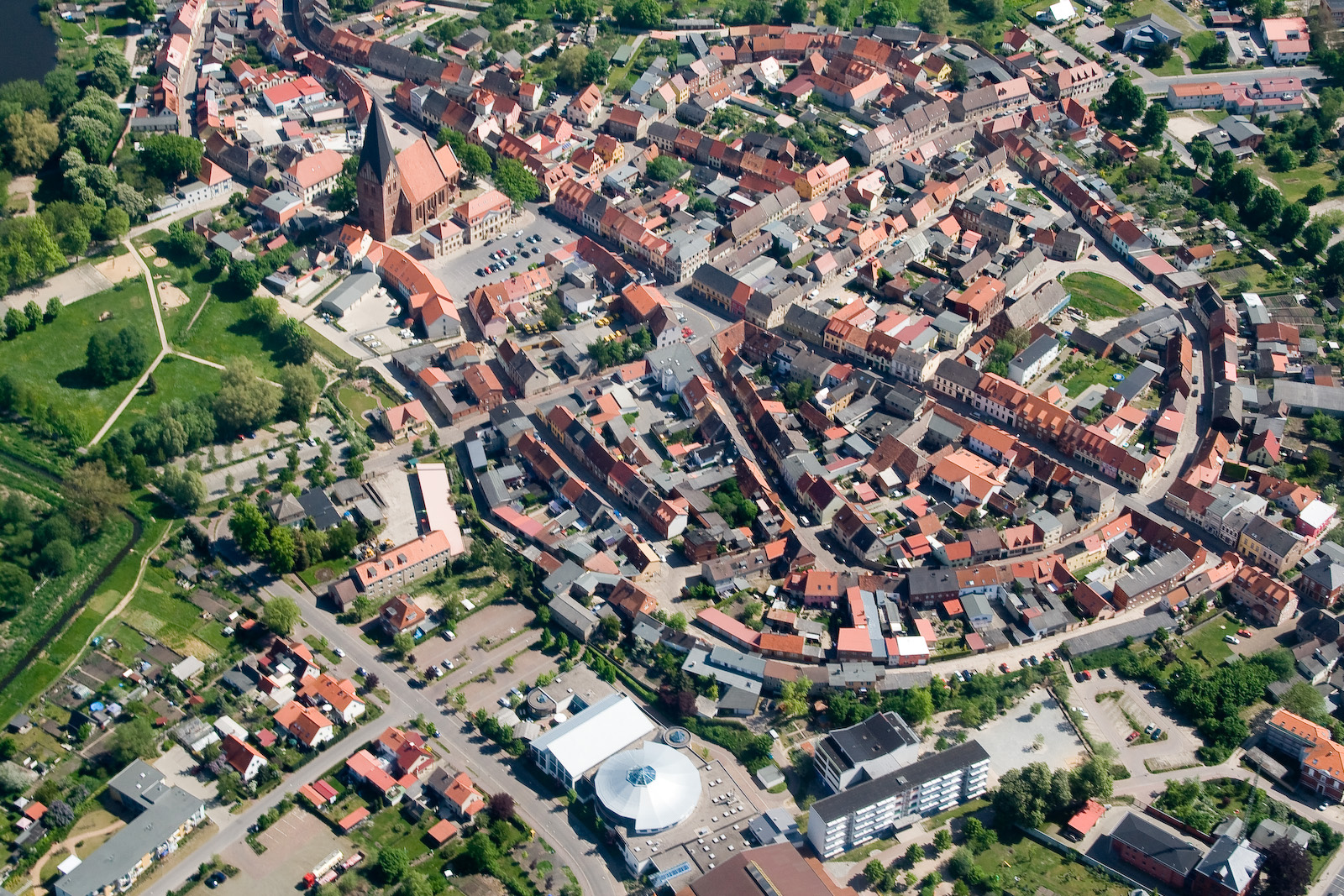
- Aerial view

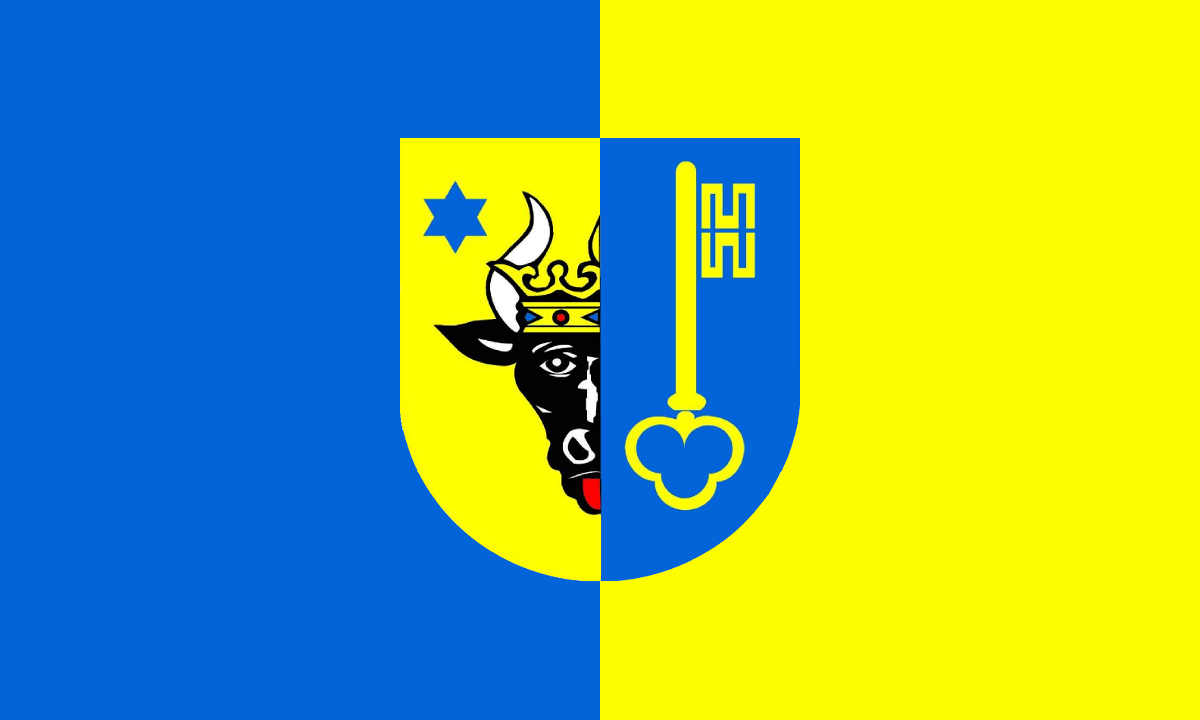
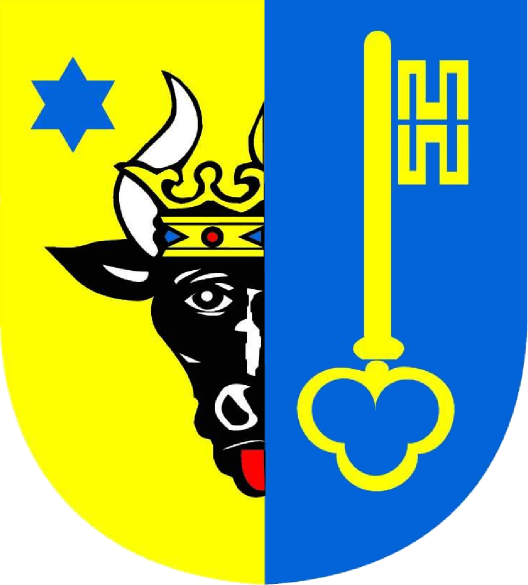
- Flag Coat of arms

- Location of Röbel within Mecklenburgische Seenplatte district
- Interactive map of Röbel
- Location within Germany Location within Mecklenburg-Vorpommern
- Coordinates: 53°22′34″N 12°36′22″E
- Country: Germany
- State: Mecklenburg-Vorpommern
- District: Mecklenburgische Seenplatte
- Municipal assoc.: Röbel-Müritz

Government
  - Mayor: Andreas Sprick (CDU)

Area
  - Total: 30.69 km^{2} (11.85 sq mi)
- Elevation: 65 m (213 ft)

Population (2025-12-31)
  - Total: 4,664
  - Density: 152.0/km^{2} (393.6/sq mi)
- Time zone: UTC+01:00 (CET)
  - Summer (DST): UTC+02:00 (CEST)
- Postal codes: 17207
- Dialling codes: 039931
- Vehicle registration: MÜR
- Website: www.stadt-roebel.de

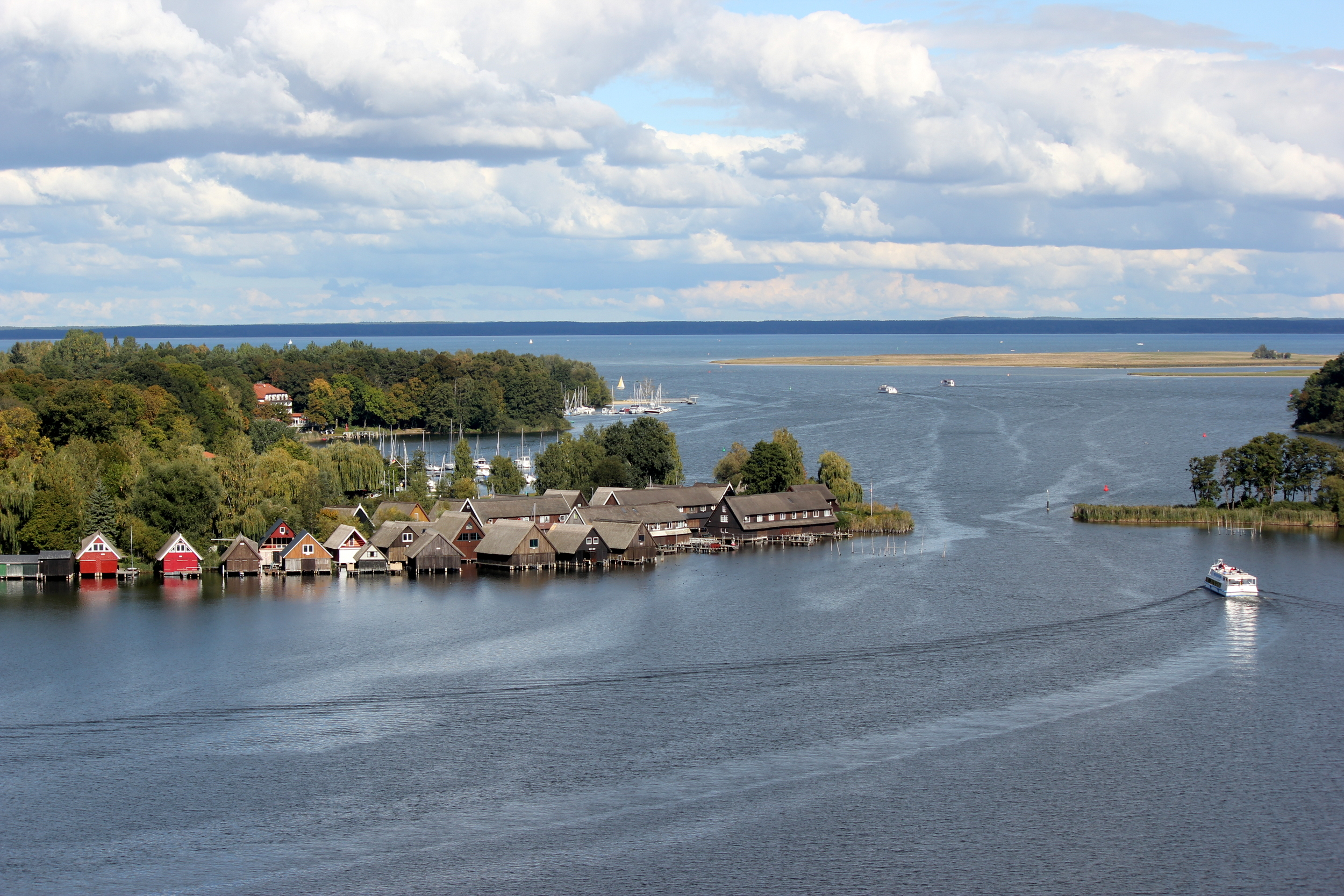
Lake Müritz in Röbel

Röbel (German: [ˈʁøːbl̩]) is a town in the Mecklenburgische Seenplatte district, in Mecklenburg-Western Pomerania, Germany. It is situated on the western shore of Lake Müritz, 25 km north of Wittstock, and 27 km southwest of Waren. It is part of the Amt Röbel-Müritz.

== Sights ==
The museum Engelscher Hof and the half-timbered former synagogue provide a permanent exhibition on Mecklenburg's Jewish history, commemorating – among other things – the life and work of Israel Jacobson, formerly consistorial president in the Kingdom of Westphalia and feudal landlord in Jördenstorf.

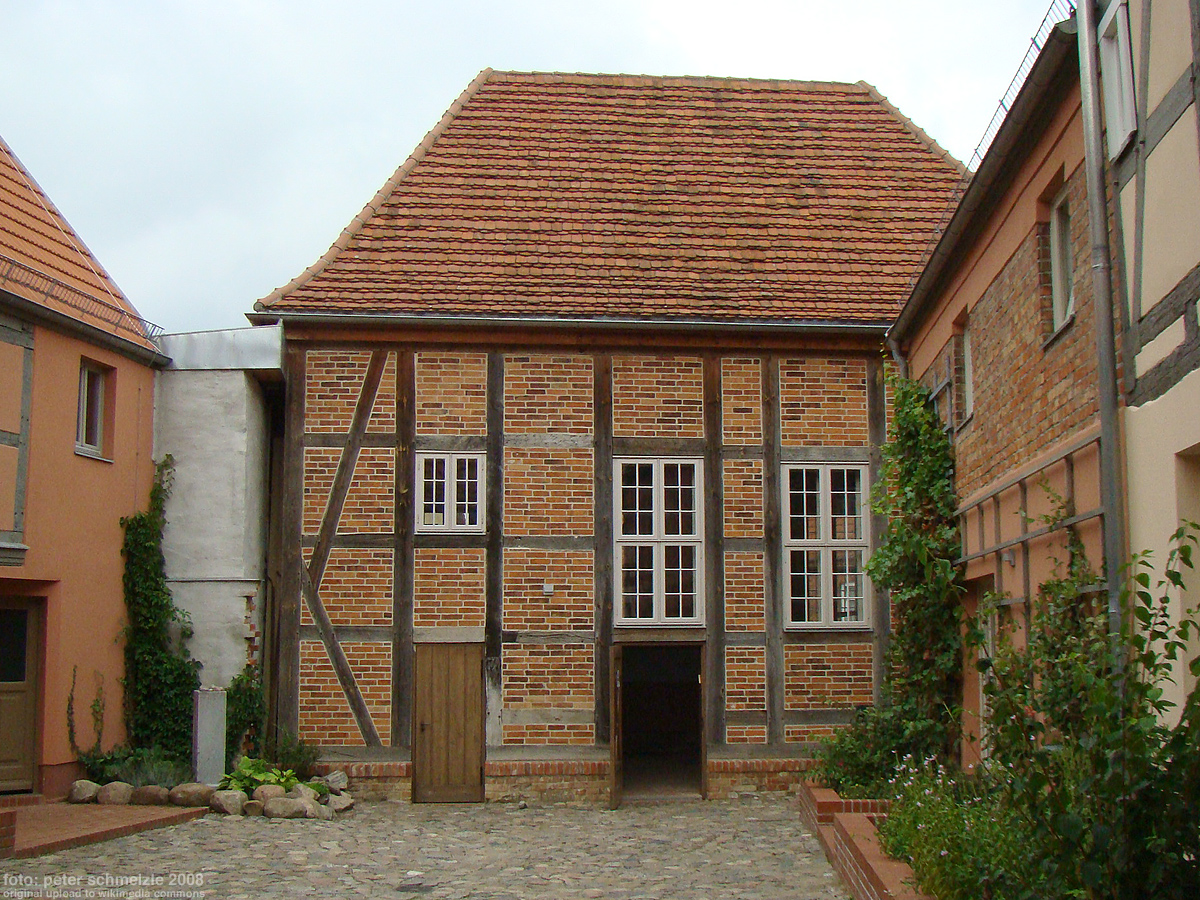
Röbel's historical Jewish centre, the synagogue.

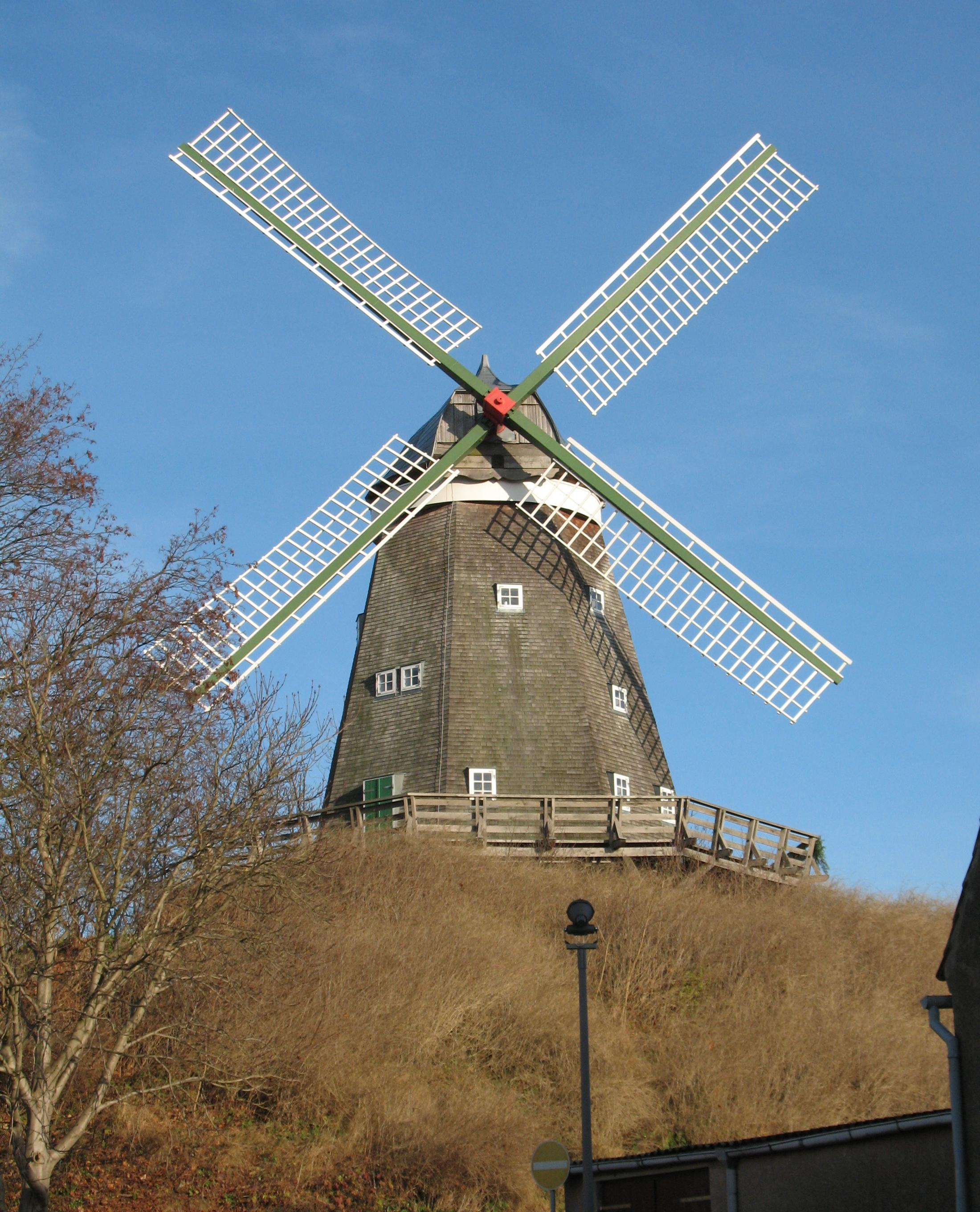
Windmill

== Notable people ==
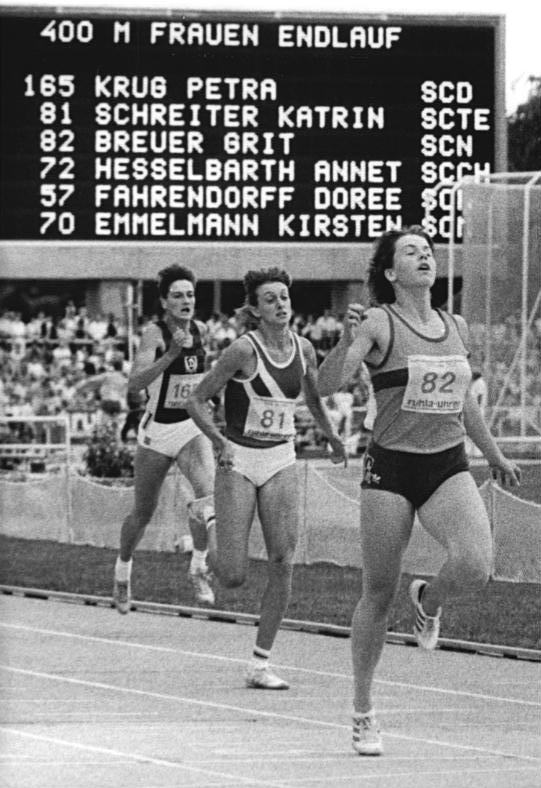
Grit Breuer (82), Katrin Schreiter, Petra Krug

- Franz Engel (1834–1920), ethnologist, biologist, and research traveler
- Gustav Melkert (1890–1943), secretary of the agricultural workers' union in the then district of Müritz and member of the SPD. Used as a Nazi resister. A street in the district of Gildekamp is named after him.
- Julius Runge (1843–1922), painter
- Grit Breuer (born 1972), athlete
- Otto Strack (1856-1935), architect who worked in Chicago, Milwaukee and New York City. Designed Pabst Hotel in New York. Noted for using steel beams in theaters and early sky scrapers.
