= Leizen =

- Municipality
- Location of Leizen within Mecklenburgische Seenplatte district
- Interactive map of Leizen
- Location within Germany Location within Mecklenburg-Vorpommern
- Coordinates: 53°21′57″N 12°28′33″E
- Country: Germany
- State: Mecklenburg-Vorpommern
- District: Mecklenburgische Seenplatte
- Municipal assoc.: Röbel-Müritz

Government
  - Mayor: Christiane Hildebrandt

Area
  - Total: 27.64 km^{2} (10.67 sq mi)
- Elevation: 73 m (240 ft)

Population (2025-12-31)
  - Total: 473
  - Density: 17.1/km^{2} (44.3/sq mi)
- Time zone: UTC+01:00 (CET)
  - Summer (DST): UTC+02:00 (CEST)
- Postal codes: 17209
- Dialling codes: 039922
- Vehicle registration: MÜR
- Website: www.amt-roebel- mueritz.de

Leizen (German pronunciation: [ˈlaɪtsn̩]) is a municipality in the Mecklenburgische Seenplatte district, in Mecklenburg-Vorpommern, Germany.

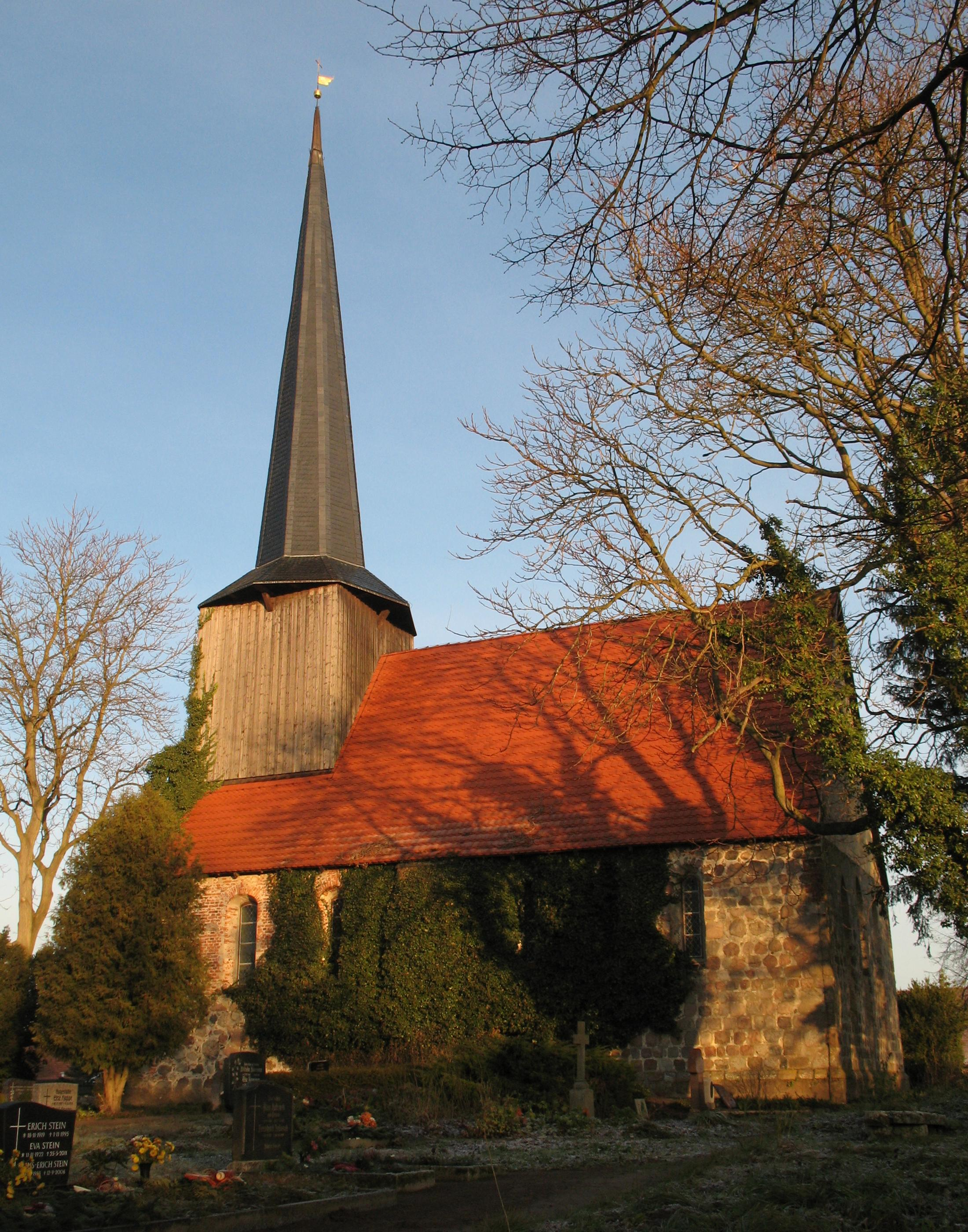
Church

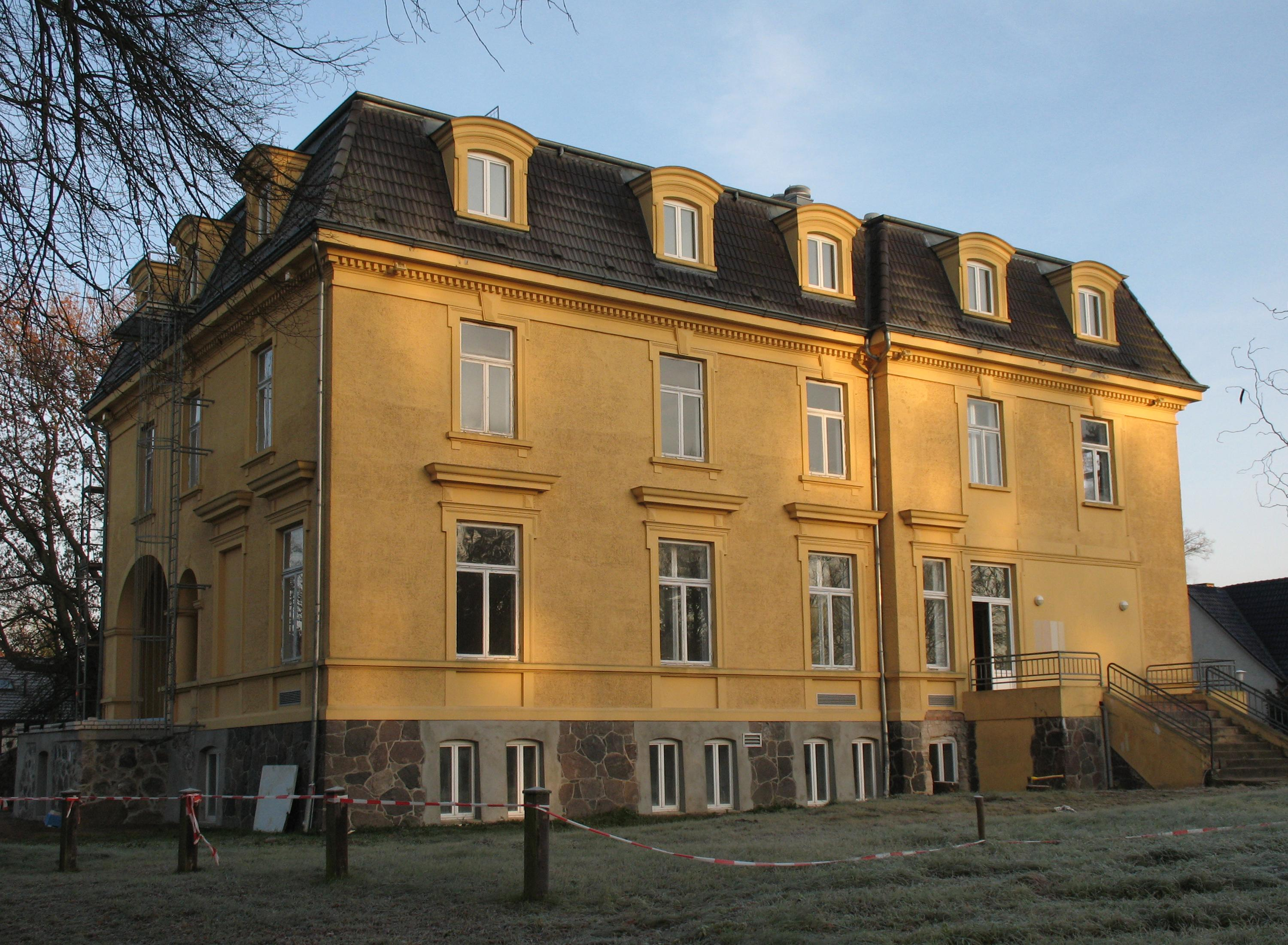
Manor

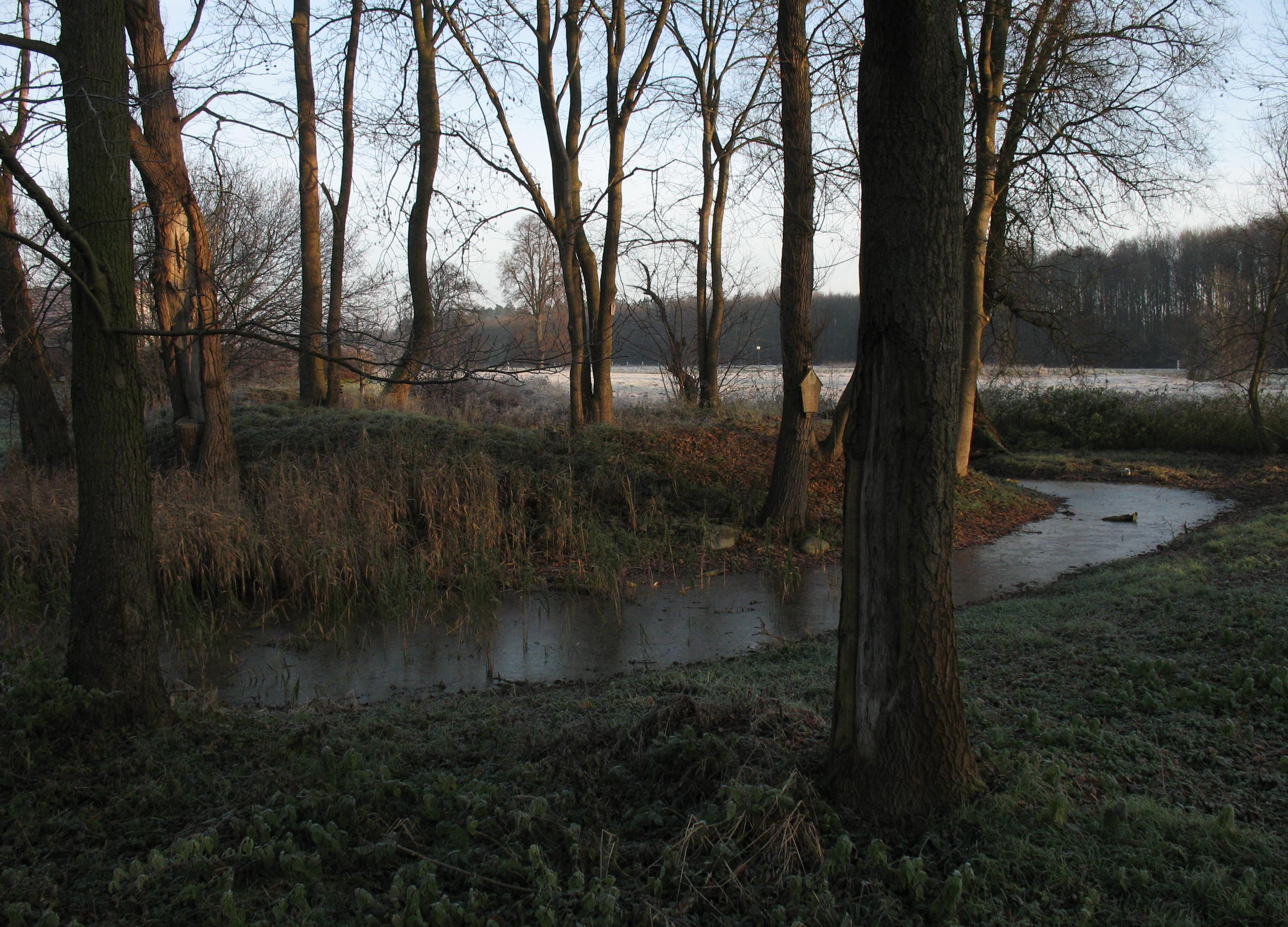
Motte
