= Wilhelm von Gegerfelt =

Swedish painter

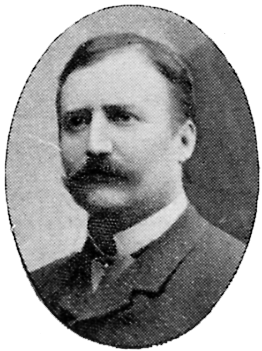
Wilhelm von Gegerfelt from the Svenskt Porträttgalleri XX

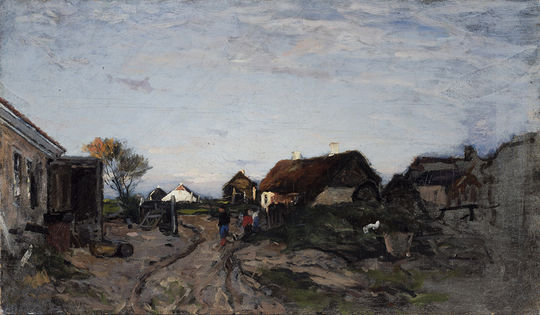
From Skagen, Østerby (1874)

Wilhelm von Gegerfelt, also Vilhelm von Gegerfelt, (9 November 1844 – 2 April 1920) was a Swedish painter.

== Biography ==
Born in Gothenburg, Gegerfelt was the son of the architect Victor von Gegerfelt (1817–1915). From 1861 to 1863, he studied at the Royal Danish Academy, at the Royal Swedish Academy from 1864 to 1867, and thereafter in Düsseldorf until 1872. He then went to Paris where he developed a new technique joining Alfred Wahlberg as one of the first Swedes to represent the Modern Breakthrough in Nordic art. He travelled to the north coast of France, to Italy and to England, painting landscapes of Venice's lagoons and the English chalk cliffs, in addition to scenes of summer evenings in Sweden. His works can be seen in the National Museum in Stockholm, in the Gothenburg Museum of Art and in Skagens Museum.

Gegerfelt exhibited in Monaco from 1883 and won a silver medal at the Vienna exhibition the same year. In Paris, he sold his paintings to the Duke of Bassano as well as to Goupil & Cie.

Gagerfelt spent his later life in the fishing village of Torekov in the south of Sweden.
