= Stuer, Mecklenburg-Vorpommern =

- Municipality
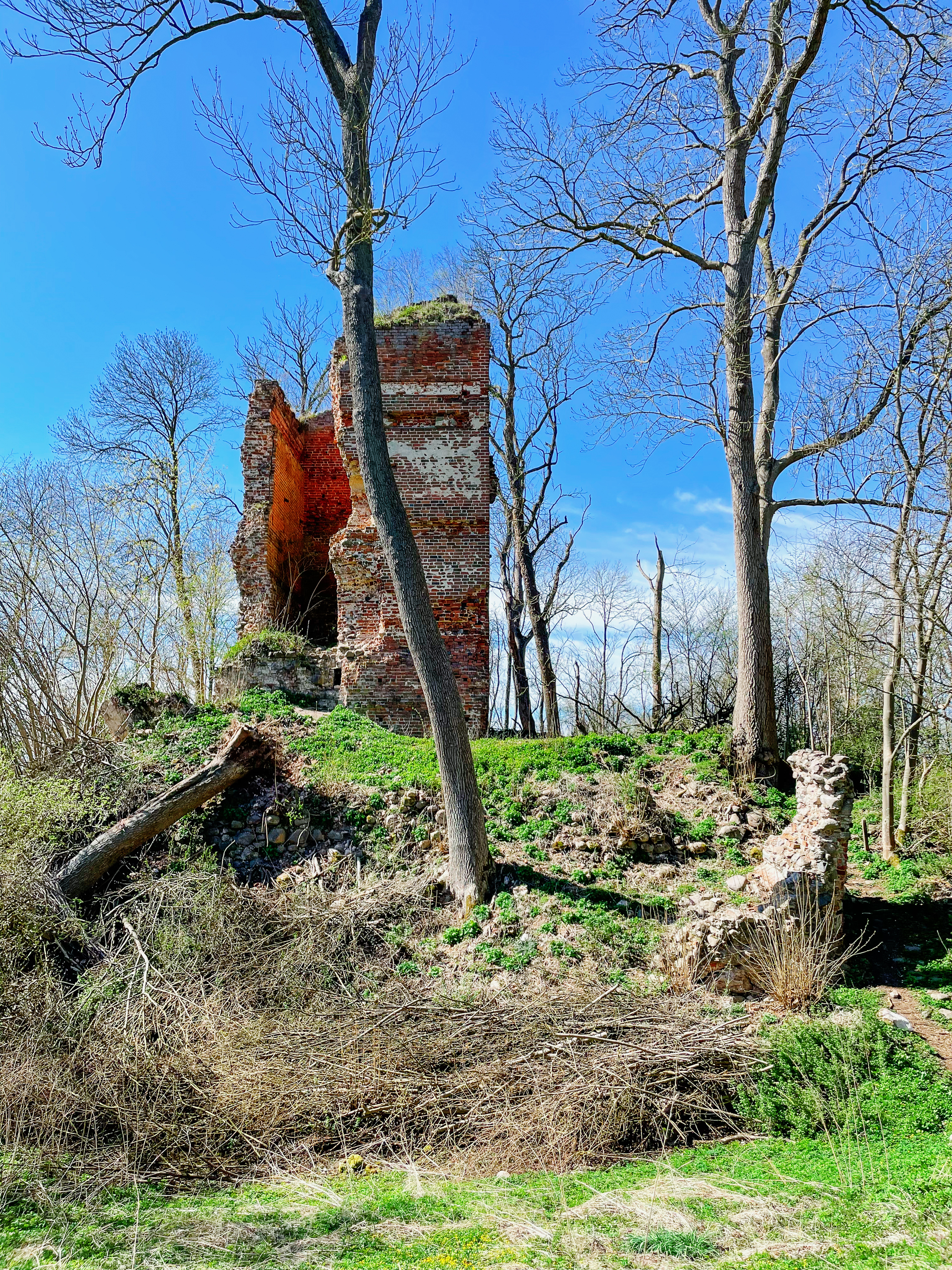
- Ruins of Burg Stuer

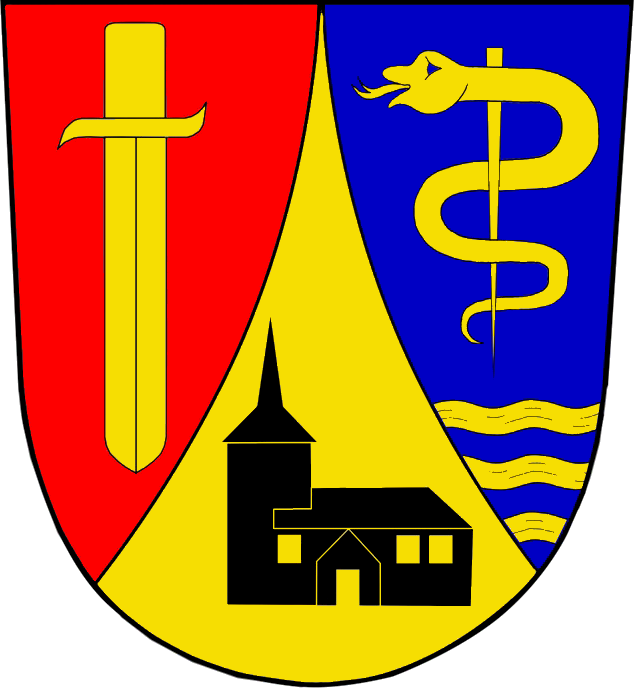
- Coat of arms

- Location of Stuer, Mecklenburg-Vorpommern within Mecklenburgische Seenplatte district
- Interactive map of Stuer, Mecklenburg-Vorpommern
- Location within Germany Location within Mecklenburg-Vorpommern
- Coordinates: 53°23′N 12°20′E
- Country: Germany
- State: Mecklenburg-Vorpommern
- District: Mecklenburgische Seenplatte
- Municipal assoc.: Röbel-Müritz

Government
  - Mayor: Gundolf Otto

Area
  - Total: 21.53 km^{2} (8.31 sq mi)
- Elevation: 87 m (285 ft)

Population (2025-12-31)
  - Total: 242
  - Density: 11.2/km^{2} (29.1/sq mi)
- Time zone: UTC+01:00 (CET)
  - Summer (DST): UTC+02:00 (CEST)
- Postal codes: 17209
- Dialling codes: 039924
- Vehicle registration: MÜR
- Website: www.amt-roebel-mueritz.de

Stuer is a municipality in the Mecklenburgische Seenplatte district, in Mecklenburg-Vorpommern, in north-eastern Germany.

== History ==
During the final stages of World War II, from 28 February to 6 March 1945, Neu Stuer (now part of the municipality) was the site of a stopover during the German-organised march of French prisoners of war from the Oflag II-B camp headed westwards.
