= Buchholz, Mecklenburg-Vorpommern =

Buchholz
- Municipality
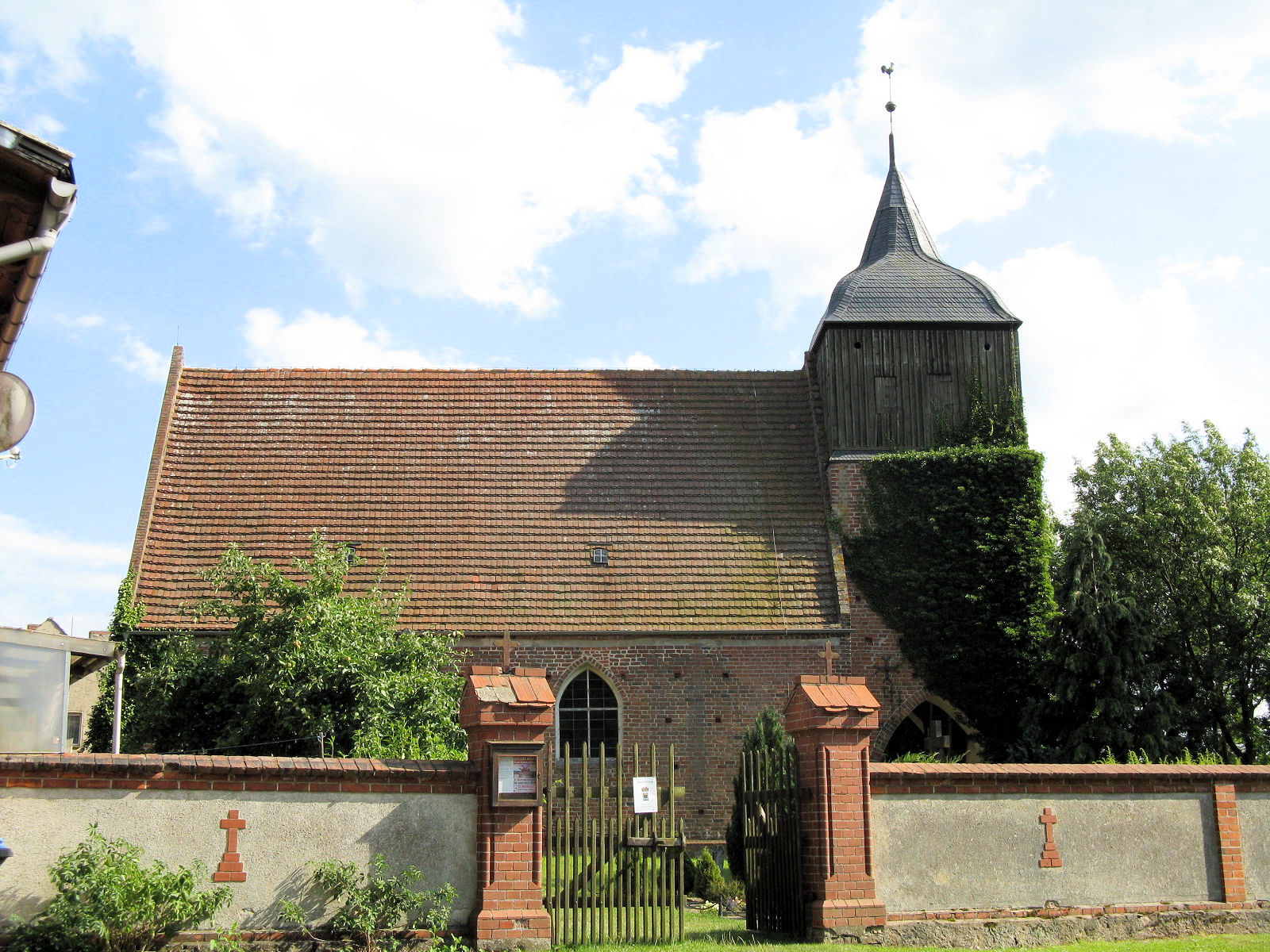
- Church in Buchholz

- Coat of arms

- Location of Buchholz within Mecklenburgische Seenplatte district
- Interactive map of Buchholz
- Location within Germany Location within Mecklenburg-Vorpommern
- Coordinates: 53°16′23″N 12°39′0″E
- Country: Germany
- State: Mecklenburg-Vorpommern
- District: Mecklenburgische Seenplatte
- Municipal assoc.: Röbel-Müritz

Government
  - Mayor: Hartmut Gehl

Area
  - Total: 15.41 km^{2} (5.95 sq mi)
- Elevation: 64 m (210 ft)

Population (2025-12-31)
  - Total: 116
  - Density: 7.53/km^{2} (19.5/sq mi)
- Time zone: UTC+01:00 (CET)
  - Summer (DST): UTC+02:00 (CEST)
- Postal codes: 17209
- Dialling codes: 039923
- Vehicle registration: MÜR
- Website: www.amt-roebel-mueritz.de

Buchholz (German pronunciation: [ˈbuːxhɔlts]) is a municipality in the Mecklenburgische Seenplatte district, in Mecklenburg-Vorpommern, Germany.
