= Franz Engel =

German naturalist (1834–1920)

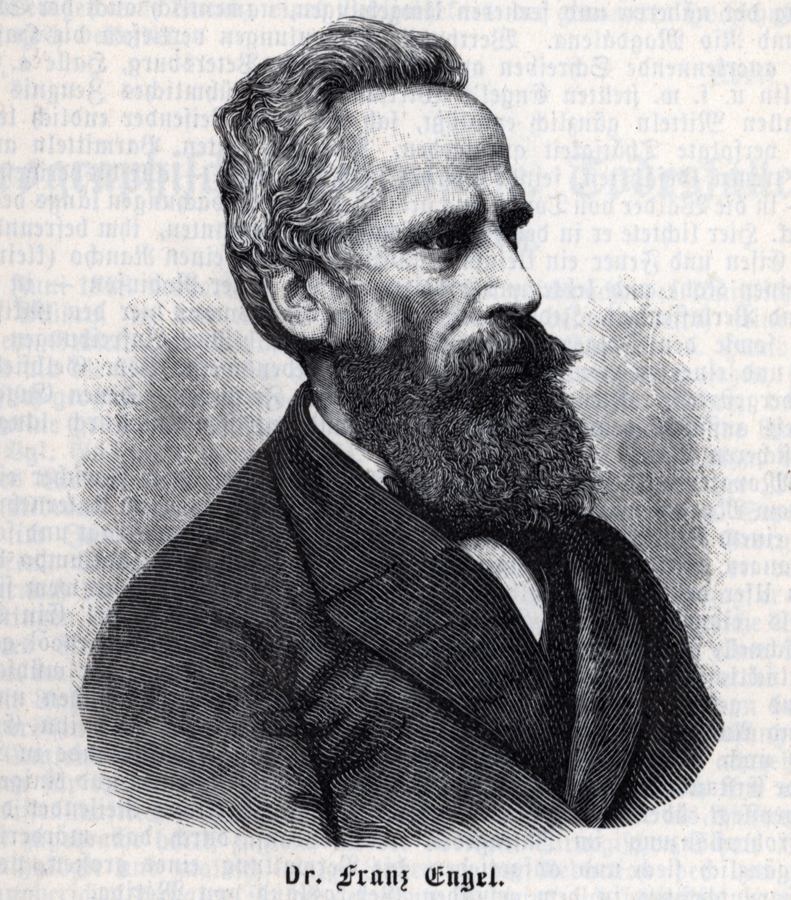
Engel in 1889

Franz Engel (1834 in Röbel – 1920 in Neubrandenburg) was a German explorer and naturalist.

Engel traveled extensively in South America between 1857 and 1863 and published the results of his explorations in several volumes, including Studien unter den Tropen Amerikas ("Studies among the American tropics," 2d ed., 1879), 'Aus dem Pflanzerstaate Zulia' ("From the plantation state of Zulia," 1881). From 1872 to 1896, he published the Landwirthschaftliche Jahrbücher ("Agricultural yearbooks").
