= Röbel-Müritz (Amt) =

Collective municipality in Mecklenburg-Vorpommern, Germany

- Amt
- Map of Mecklenburgische Seenplatte highlighting Röbel-Müritz
- Interactive map of Röbel-Müritz
- Location within Germany Location within Mecklenburg-Vorpommern
- Coordinates: 53°21′N 12°33′E
- Country: Germany
- State: Mecklenburg-Vorpommern
- District: Mecklenburgische Seenplatte
- Seat: Röbel
- Subdivisions: 19 municipalities

Area
  - Total: 573.24 km^{2} (221.33 sq mi)

Population (2025-12-31)
  - Total: 13,573
  - Density: 23.678/km^{2} (61.325/sq mi)
- Time zone: UTC+01:00 (CET)
  - Summer (DST): UTC+02:00 (CEST)
- Website: www.amt-roebel-mueritz.de

Röbel-Müritz is an Amt in the Mecklenburgische Seenplatte district, in Mecklenburg-Vorpommern, Germany. The seat of the Amt is in the town of Röbel.

The Amt Röbel-Müritz consists of the following municipalities:

1. Altenhof
2. Bollewick
3. Buchholz
4. Bütow
5. Eldetal
6. Fincken
7. Gotthun
8. Groß Kelle
9. Kieve
10. Lärz
11. Leizen
12. Melz
13. Priborn
14. Rechlin
15. Röbel
16. Schwarz
17. Sietow
18. Stuer
19. Südmüritz
