= Fincken =

- Municipality
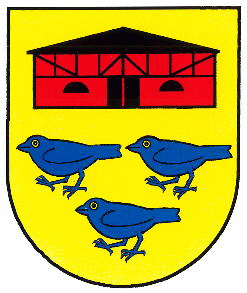
- Coat of arms

- Location of Fincken within Mecklenburgische Seenplatte district
- Interactive map of Fincken
- Location within Germany Location within Mecklenburg-Vorpommern
- Coordinates: 53°21′00″N 12°25′59″E
- Country: Germany
- State: Mecklenburg-Vorpommern
- District: Mecklenburgische Seenplatte
- Municipal assoc.: Röbel-Müritz

Government
  - Mayor: Erich Nacke

Area
  - Total: 34.95 km^{2} (13.49 sq mi)
- Elevation: 70 m (230 ft)

Population (2025-12-31)
  - Total: 475
  - Density: 13.6/km^{2} (35.2/sq mi)
- Time zone: UTC+01:00 (CET)
  - Summer (DST): UTC+02:00 (CEST)
- Postal codes: 17209
- Dialling codes: 039922
- Vehicle registration: MÜR
- Website: www.amt-roebel- mueritz.de

Fincken (German pronunciation: [ˈfɪŋkn̩]) is a municipality in the Mecklenburgische Seenplatte district, in Mecklenburg-Vorpommern, Germany.

== Geography ==
The municipality Fincken is located in the Mecklenburg Lake District in a hilly area, of which Eckersberg at 96 m above sea level is the highest point. In the municipality is the river Elde carrying into Finckener lake. The town Röbel is approximately twelve kilometers away.

=== Populated places ===
Fincken includes the following districts:

- Fincken proper: Fincken, Käselin, Knüppeldamm
- Jaebetz: Jaebetz, Dammwolde, Fichtental, Marienhof

In Dammwolde is the historically interesting Evangelical Church Dammwolde.

== History ==
Fincken was first mentioned in 1310 in a contract between the Prince of Werle and the Margraviate of Brandenburg. Among the owners of the village were the knights of Grambow, the families of Pritzbuer, Helmuth von Pederstorff and the aristocratic family von Blücher. At times, there was a glassworks in today's district Knüppeldamm.

The Fincken church dates back to 1748. It is probably the only church in the country church (Landeskirche) of Mecklenburg, which was leased by the Protestant parish to the community. Together they successfully raised money to maintain the building, and as a result, in 2009, the ceiling of the church room was renovated.

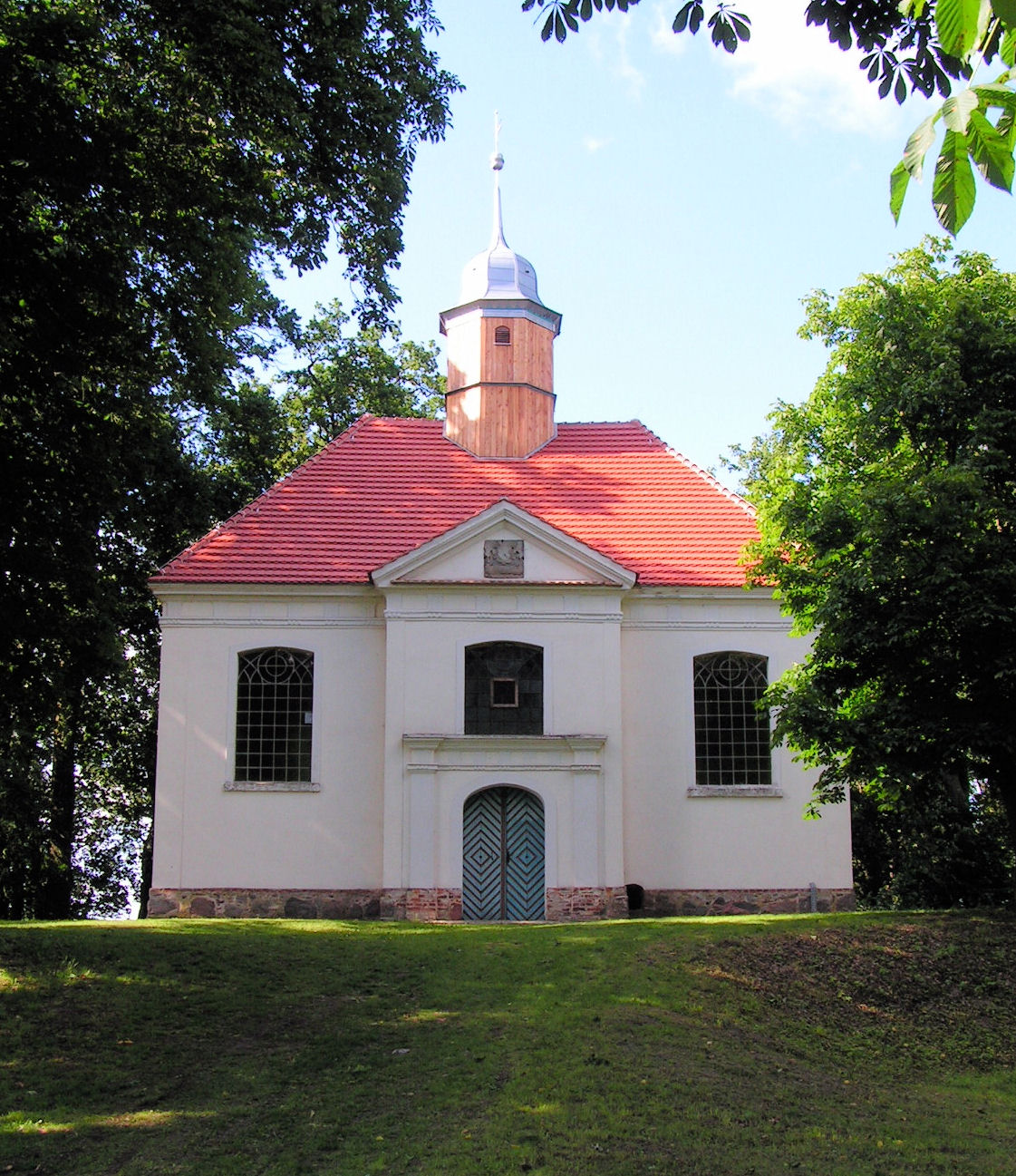
Church in Fincken

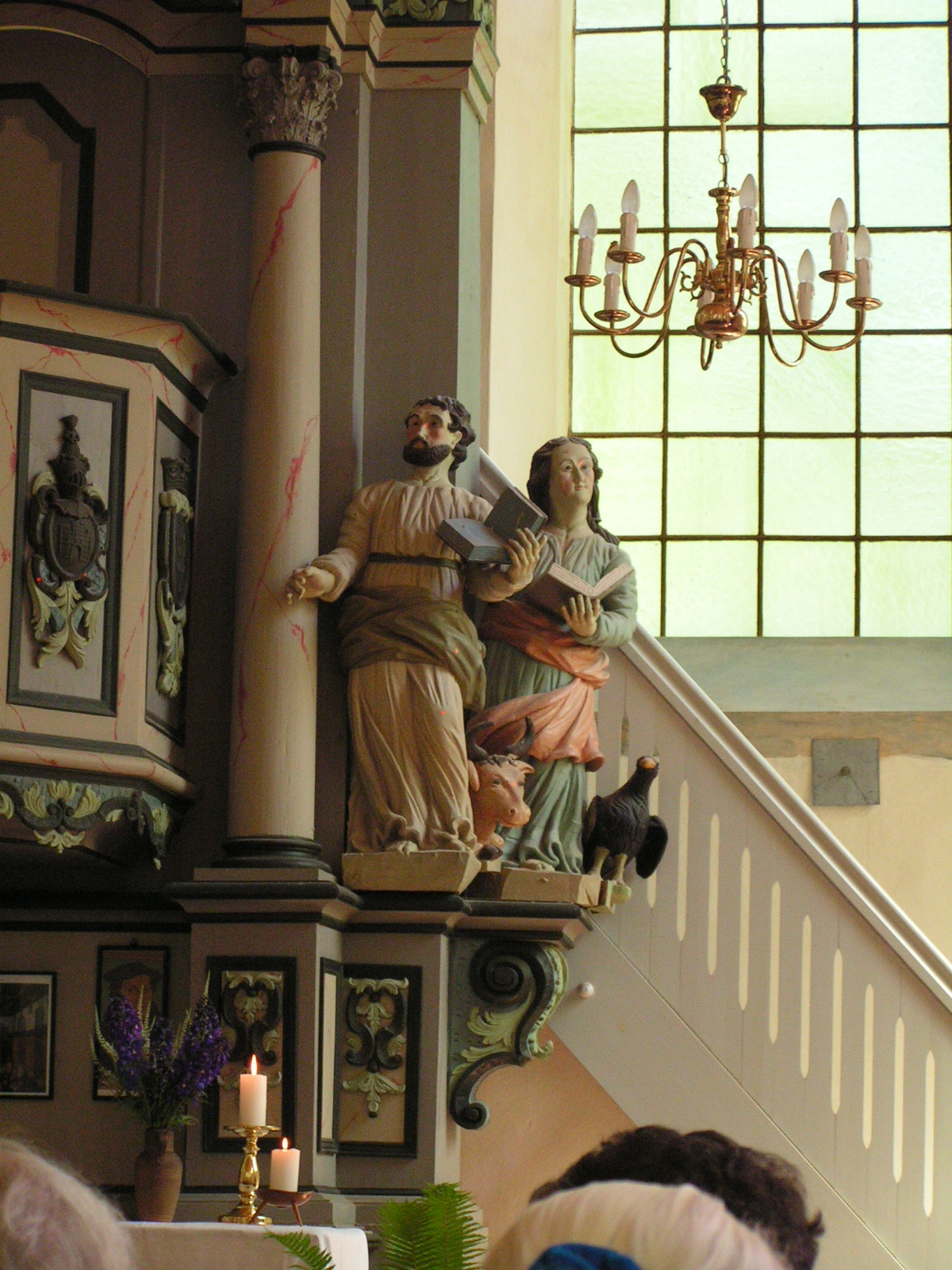
Church in Fincken – Interior

In the early 1930s Fincken and other places in the area were settled with many farmers.

With effect from 1 January 2010, the municipality Jaebetz was incorporated to Fincken.

== Crest ==
The coat of arms was designed by the graphic artist Werner Schinko from Röbel (1929–2016). It was approved on 10 July 2000 by the Ministry of Internal Affairs. Blazon: "In gold a red round barn with flat black conical roof, black truss in the upper wall portion and a closed black gate between two small black arched windows in the lower wall portion; including three (2:1) border blue finches, each with a golden eye ".

== Attractions ==
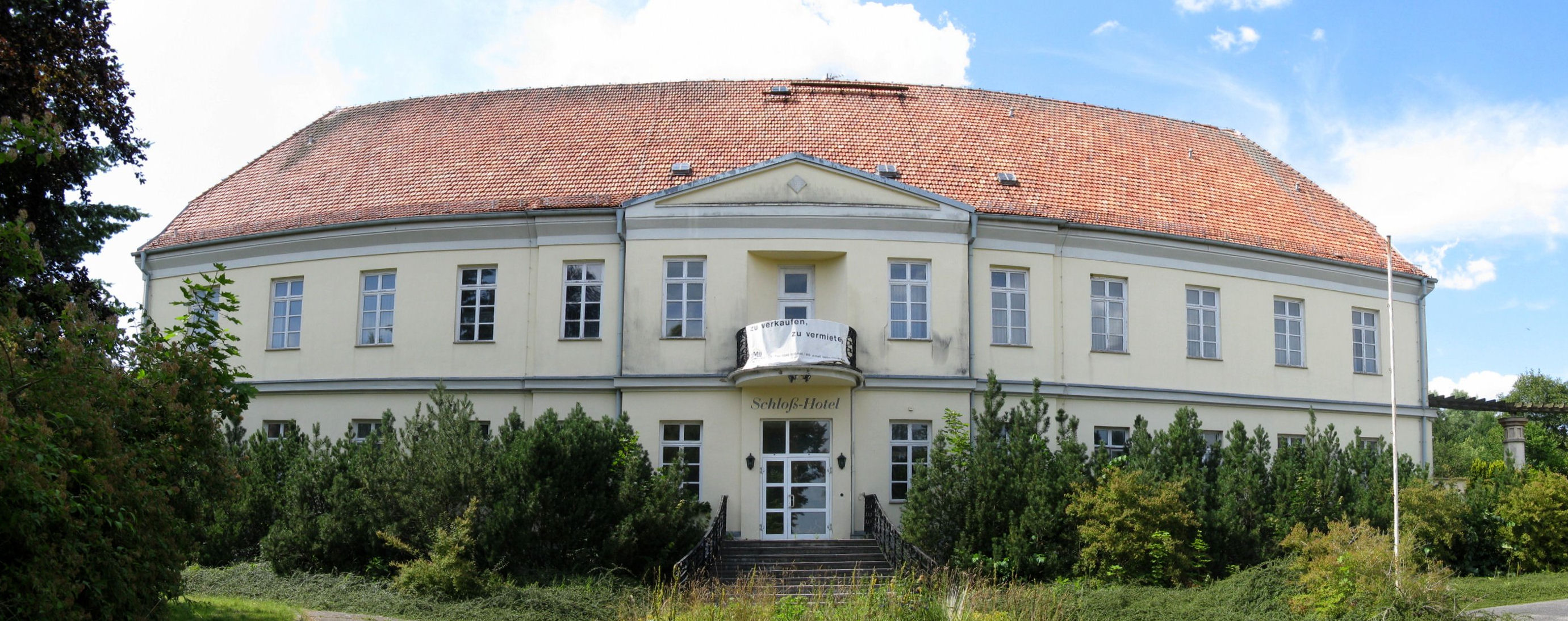
Fincken Gutshaus mansion

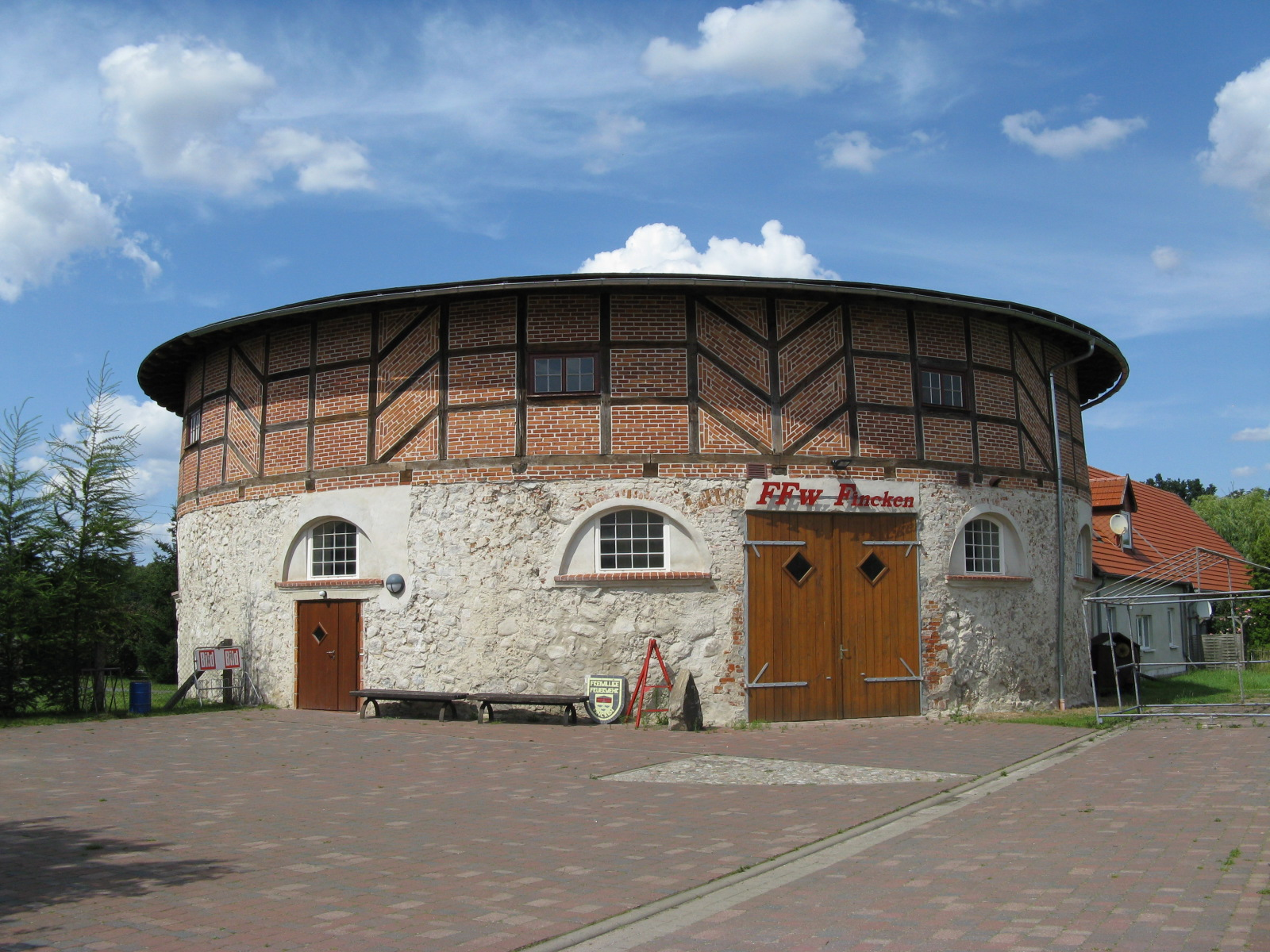
Fincken Round barn

Interesting is the former Gutshaus mansion in Fincken, which was used in the communist era as working holiday home. Now it has been restored and converted into a hotel, but is now empty again. The Kavalierhaus of the former mansion is operated as a hotel since 2010. The round barn was a former horse stables dating from the 18th century and is now after a renovation a community center. A few hundred meters east of Fincken was exposed a glacial erratic on Bundesautobahn 19. The area around Fincken is accessible by hiking trails.

== Transportation ==
Near Fincken crosses the national road B 198 the Bundesautobahn 19 (Wittstock-Rostock) with the exit Röbel. Fincken had a breakpoint on the railway Ganzlin-Röbel. Passenger traffic on the route has already been shut down in 1966. The track was shut down in 2012 and dismantled in January 2013. The nearest train station for passengers is now located in Malchow.
