= Sietow =

- Municipality
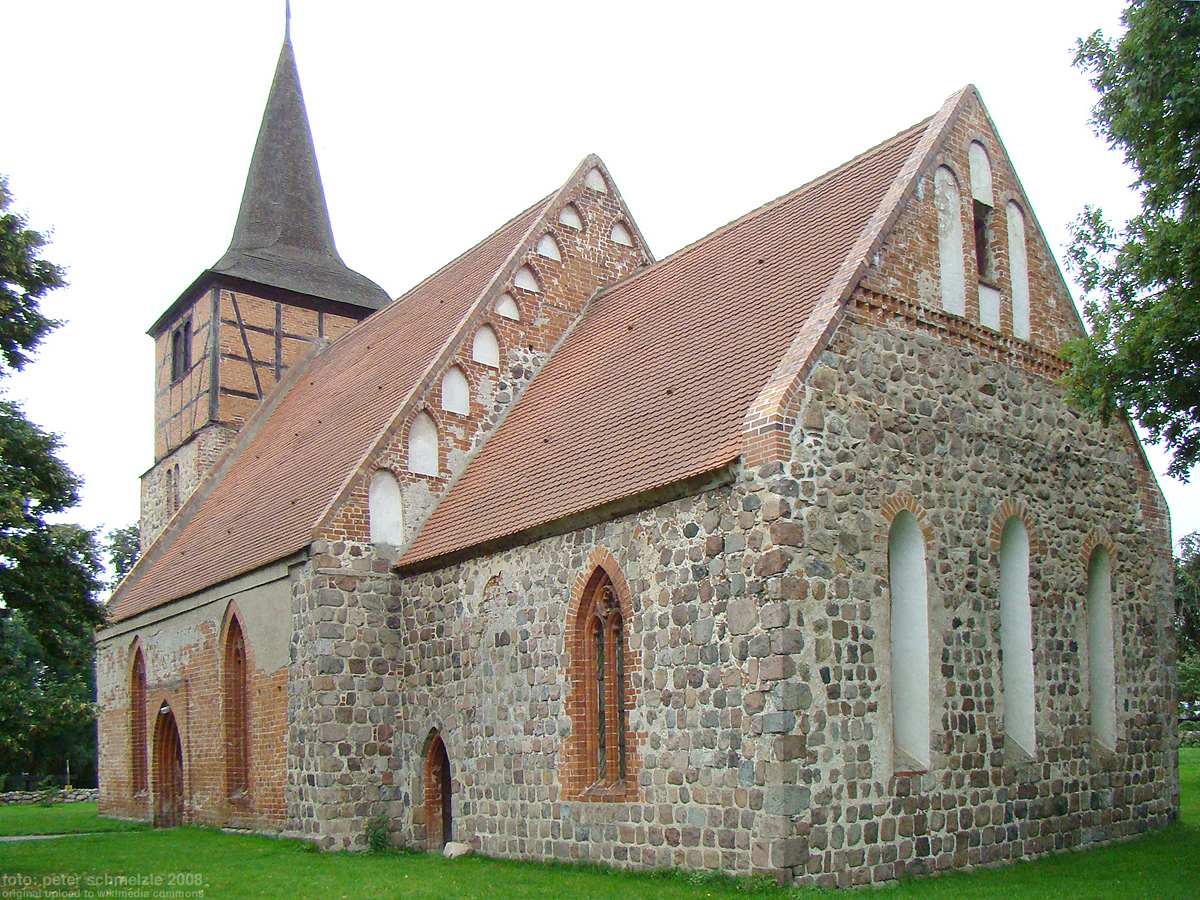
- Medieval church in Sietow

- Location of Sietow within Mecklenburgische Seenplatte district
- Interactive map of Sietow
- Location within Germany Location within Mecklenburg-Vorpommern
- Coordinates: 53°27′00″N 12°33′11″E
- Country: Germany
- State: Mecklenburg-Vorpommern
- District: Mecklenburgische Seenplatte
- Municipal assoc.: Röbel-Müritz

Government
  - Mayor: Ulrich Rath

Area
  - Total: 18.87 km^{2} (7.29 sq mi)
- Elevation: 73 m (240 ft)

Population (2025-12-31)
  - Total: 548
  - Density: 29.0/km^{2} (75.2/sq mi)
- Time zone: UTC+01:00 (CET)
  - Summer (DST): UTC+02:00 (CEST)
- Postal codes: 17207
- Dialling codes: 039931
- Vehicle registration: MÜR
- Website: www.amt-roebel- mueritz.de

Sietow (German pronunciation: [ˈziːtoː]; Polabian Żytko) is a municipality in the Mecklenburgische Seenplatte district, in Mecklenburg-Vorpommern, Germany.
