= Alsophila brooksii =

Scientific classification
- Kingdom: Plantae
- Clade: Tracheophytes
- Division: Polypodiophyta
- Class: Polypodiopsida
- Order: Cyatheales
- Family: Cyatheaceae
- Genus: Alsophila
- Species: A. brooksii

Binomial name
- Alsophila brooksii (Maxon) R.M.Tryon

Synonyms
- Cyathea brooksii Maxon

Species of plant

Alsophila brooksii, synonym Cyathea brooksii, is a species of tree fern native to Cuba, Hispaniola and Puerto Rico, where it grows on serpentine soils in shaded ravines, along streams, and on forested slopes at an altitude of 250–950 m. The trunk is prostrate and only about 6 cm in diameter. Fronds are pinnate or bipinnate and up to 2 m long. The base of the rachis is covered with blackish scales that have a paler margin. Sori occur in two rows, one along each side of the pinnule midvein.

In the wild, A. brooksii is known to hybridise with Alsophila fulgens and Alsophila portoricensis, although the resulting plants are thought to be sterile.

This taxon is not to be confused with Cyathea brooksii Copel., which is a synonym of Sphaeropteris squamulata.
