= Rechlin =

- Municipality
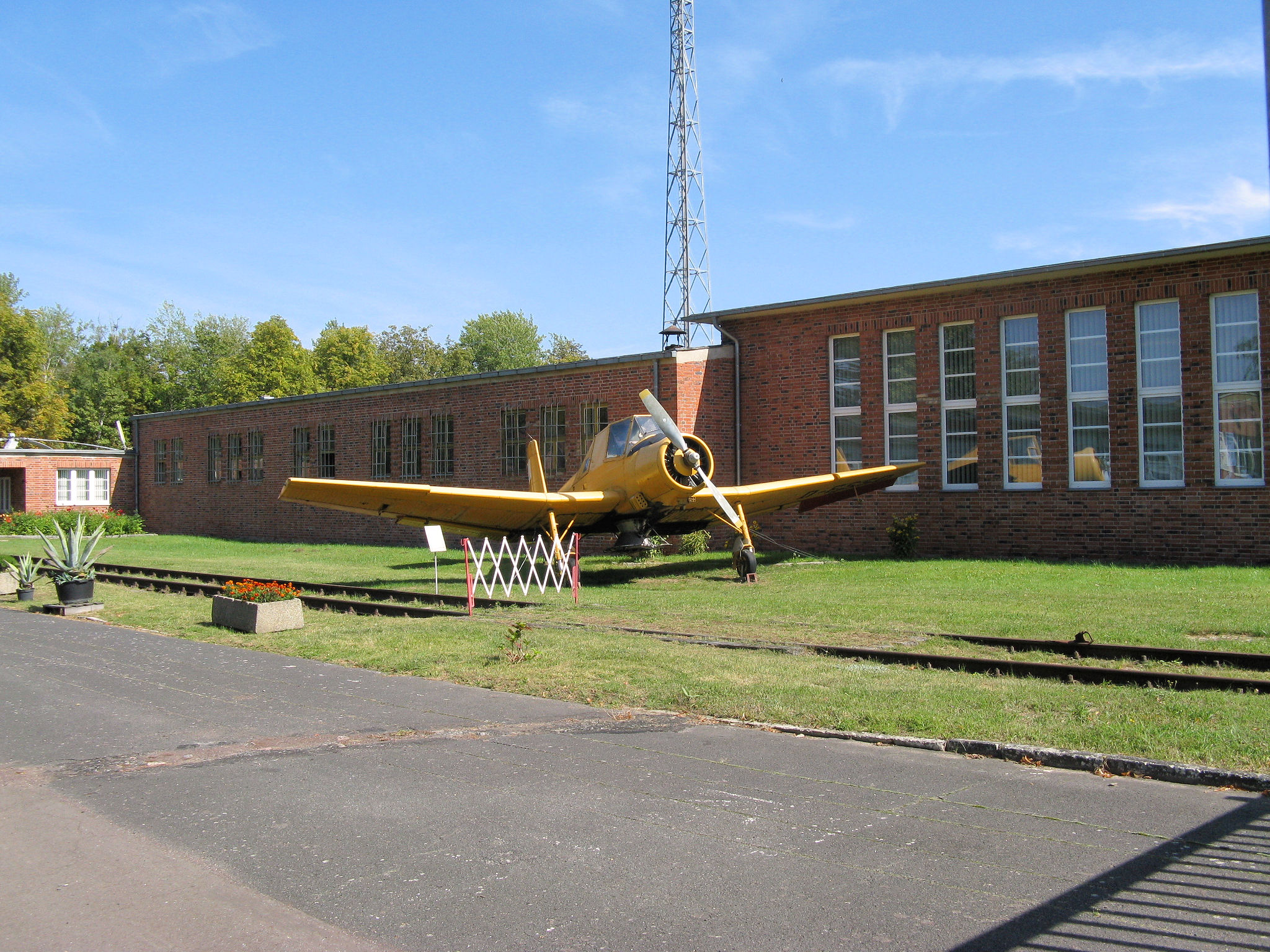
- Aviation technical museum in Rechlin

- Coat of arms

- Location of Rechlin within Mecklenburgische Seenplatte district
- Interactive map of Rechlin
- Location within Germany Location within Mecklenburg-Vorpommern
- Coordinates: 53°20′N 12°43′E
- Country: Germany
- State: Mecklenburg-Vorpommern
- District: Mecklenburgische Seenplatte
- Municipal assoc.: Röbel-Müritz

Government
  - Mayor: Wolf-Dieter Ringguth

Area
  - Total: 77.28 km^{2} (29.84 sq mi)
- Elevation: 67 m (220 ft)

Population (2025-12-31)
  - Total: 1,992
  - Density: 25.78/km^{2} (66.76/sq mi)
- Time zone: UTC+01:00 (CET)
  - Summer (DST): UTC+02:00 (CEST)
- Postal codes: 17248
- Dialling codes: 039823
- Vehicle registration: MÜR
- Website: www.amt-roebel-mueritz.de

Rechlin is a municipality in Mecklenburg-Western Pomerania, Germany, around 100 km (60 mi) northwest of Berlin. The town's airport has a long history and was the Luftwaffe's main testing ground for new aircraft designs in Nazi Germany. The Luftfahrttechnisches Museum (Aviation Technology Museum) in Rechlin houses displays of aircraft and related technology from the two World Wars and the Soviet era.

The town has become popular with travelers thanks to being located at one of the entrances to Müritz National Park.

== People ==
- Wilhelm Joachim von Hammerstein (1838–1904), German politician
