= Priborn =

- Municipality
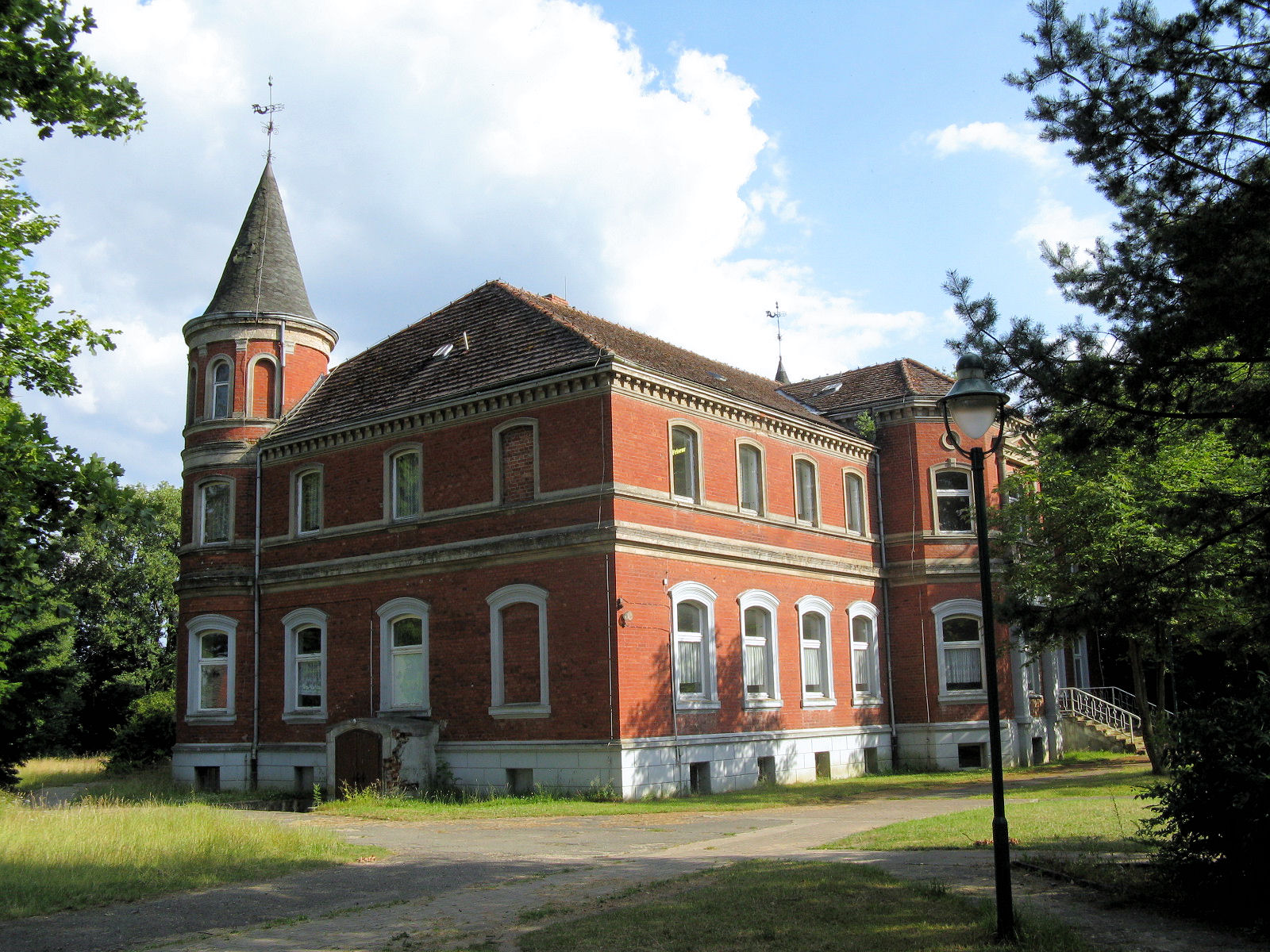
- Priborn Manor

- Location of Priborn within Mecklenburgische Seenplatte district
- Interactive map of Priborn
- Location within Germany Location within Mecklenburg-Vorpommern
- Coordinates: 53°17′48″N 12°39′47″E
- Country: Germany
- State: Mecklenburg-Vorpommern
- District: Mecklenburgische Seenplatte
- Municipal assoc.: Röbel-Müritz

Government
  - Mayor: Beate Höhn

Area
  - Total: 15.32 km^{2} (5.92 sq mi)
- Elevation: 63 m (207 ft)

Population (2025-12-31)
  - Total: 352
  - Density: 23.0/km^{2} (59.5/sq mi)
- Time zone: UTC+01:00 (CET)
  - Summer (DST): UTC+02:00 (CEST)
- Postal codes: 17209
- Dialling codes: 039923
- Vehicle registration: MÜR
- Website: www.amt-roebel-mueritz.de

Priborn is a municipality in the Mecklenburgische Seenplatte district, in Mecklenburg-Vorpommern, Germany.
