= Gotthun =

- Municipality
- Location of Gotthun within Mecklenburgische Seenplatte district
- Interactive map of Gotthun
- Location within Germany Location within Mecklenburg-Vorpommern
- Coordinates: 53°25′00″N 12°35′12″E
- Country: Germany
- State: Mecklenburg-Vorpommern
- District: Mecklenburgische Seenplatte
- Municipal assoc.: Röbel-Müritz

Government
  - Mayor: Johannes Saathoff

Area
  - Total: 10.00 km^{2} (3.86 sq mi)
- Elevation: 68 m (223 ft)

Population (2025-12-31)
  - Total: 309
  - Density: 30.9/km^{2} (80.0/sq mi)
- Time zone: UTC+01:00 (CET)
  - Summer (DST): UTC+02:00 (CEST)
- Postal codes: 17207
- Dialling codes: 039931
- Vehicle registration: MÜR
- Website: www.amt-roebel- mueritz.de

Gotthun is a municipality in the Mecklenburgische Seenplatte district, in Mecklenburg-Vorpommern, Germany.
