= Klink, Germany =

Klink
- Municipality
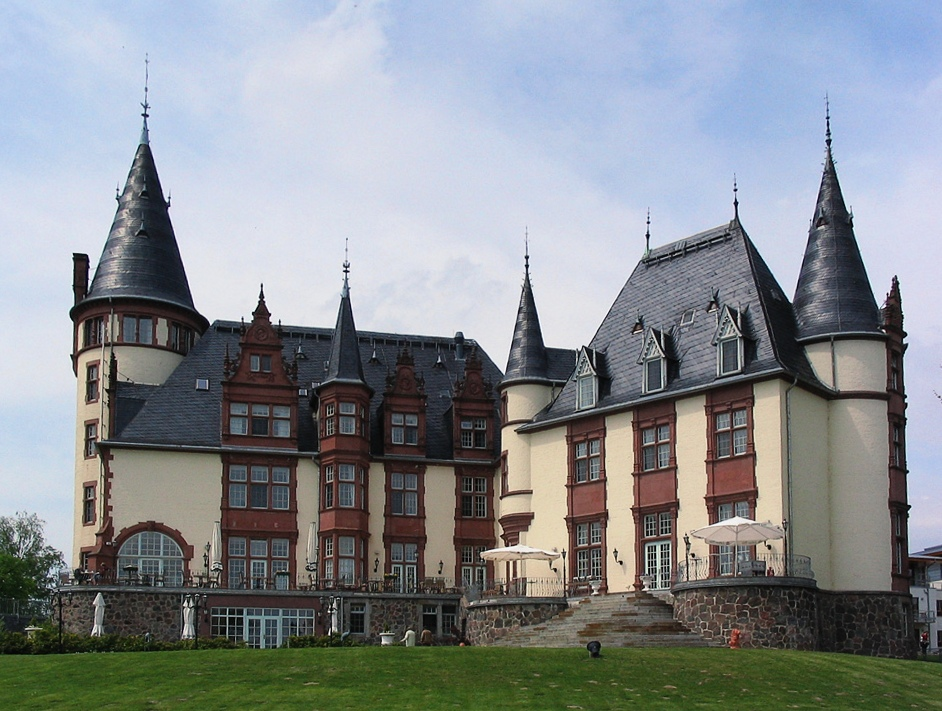
- Klink Castle

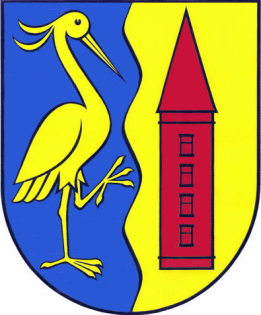
- Coat of arms

- Location of Klink within Mecklenburgische Seenplatte district
- Interactive map of Klink
- Location within Germany Location within Mecklenburg-Vorpommern
- Coordinates: 53°28′59″N 12°37′11″E
- Country: Germany
- State: Mecklenburg-Vorpommern
- District: Mecklenburgische Seenplatte
- Municipal assoc.: Seenlandschaft Waren

Government
  - Mayor: Jana Böckmann

Area
  - Total: 25.42 km^{2} (9.81 sq mi)
- Elevation: 65 m (213 ft)

Population (2025-12-31)
  - Total: 1,105
  - Density: 43.47/km^{2} (112.6/sq mi)
- Time zone: UTC+01:00 (CET)
  - Summer (DST): UTC+02:00 (CEST)
- Postal codes: 17192
- Dialling codes: 03991
- Vehicle registration: MÜR
- Website: https://www.gemeinde-klink.info/

Klink is a municipality in the Mecklenburgische Seenplatte district, in Mecklenburg-Vorpommern, Germany.
