= Alsophila woodwardioides =

Scientific classification
- Kingdom: Plantae
- Clade: Tracheophytes
- Division: Polypodiophyta
- Class: Polypodiopsida
- Order: Cyatheales
- Family: Cyatheaceae
- Genus: Alsophila
- Species: A. woodwardioides

Binomial name
- Alsophila woodwardioides (Kaulf.) D.S.Conant

Synonyms
- Alsophila hieronymi Brause; Cyathea araneosa Maxon; Cyathea arborea var. nigrescens Hook.; Cyathea hieronymi Brause; Cyathea hystricosa C.V.Morton; Cyathea nigrescens (Hook.) J.Sm.; Cyathea woodwardioides Kaulf.

Species of fern

Alsophila woodwardioides is a species of tree fern native to Jamaica, Cuba and Hispaniola (the Dominican Republic).
