= Hofsee =

Hofsee may refer to one of several lakes in Germany:

in Mecklenburg-Vorpommern

- Hofsee (Neu Gaarz)
- Hofsee (Satow)
- Hofsee (Zurow)
- Hofsee (Federow)
- Hofsee (Kargow)
- Hofsee (Speck)
