= Schönau =

Schönau (German pronunciation: [ˈʃøːnaʊ]) may refer to:

== People ==
- Horst Schönau, East German bobsledder
- Elizabeth of Schönau, a Benedictine nun at Schönau Abbey of Nassau and a friend of Hildegarde of Bingen

== Places ==
=== Germany ===
- Schönau (Odenwald), a town in Baden-Württemberg
  - Schönau Abbey, in this town
- Schönau im Schwarzwald, a town in Baden-Württemberg
- Schönau (Mannheim), a district in the north of Mannheim, Baden-Württemberg
- Schönau an der Brend, a municipality in the district of Rhön-Grabfeld in Bavaria
- Schönau, Lower Bavaria, a municipality in the district of Rottal-Inn in Bavaria
- Schönau am Königsee, a municipality in Bavaria
- Schönau, site of a subcamp of Buchenwald
- Lansen-Schönau, a municipality in Mecklenburg-Western Pomerania
- Schönau, Rhineland-Palatinate, part of Dahner Felsenland
- Schönau-Berzdorf, a municipality in Saxony
- Schönau Abbey (Nassau) of Nassau, near present-day Lipporn, Rhineland-Palatinate
- Kloster Schönau (Gemünden am Main), an Ortsteil and monastery in Gemünden am Main, Bavaria

=== Austria ===
- Schönau im Mühlkreis, in Upper Austria
- Schönau an der Triesting, in Lower Austria

=== Czech Republic ===
- Šenov u Nového Jičína, a municipality in Nový Jičín District
- Šonov, a municipality in Náchod District

=== Poland ===
- Trzciana, West Pomeranian Voivodeship (formerly Schönau)), a village

== See also ==
- Schœnau, a commune of the Bas-Rhin department, in France
