= Grubenhagen =

Grubenhagen may refer to:

- Grubenhagen Castle (Einbeck), a ruined castle near Einbeck, Lower Saxony
- Grubenhagen Castle (Vollrathsruhe), a ruined castle in Schloß Grubenhagen, Mecklenburg-Western Pomerania
- The Welf Principality of Grubenhagen named after the castle
- A village in the municipality of Weitenhagen in the district of Ostvorpommern in Mecklenburg-Vorpommern, Germany
- The village of Kirch Grubenhagen in the municipality of Vollrathsruhe in Müritz district in Mecklenburg-Vorpommern, Germany
