= Vielist =

- Ortsteil of Grabowhöfe
- Coat of arms
- Interactive map of Vielist
- Location within Germany Location within Mecklenburg-Vorpommern
- Coordinates: 53°33′11″N 12°38′12″E
- Country: Germany
- State: Mecklenburg-Vorpommern
- District: Mecklenburgische Seenplatte
- Municipality: Grabowhöfe

Area
  - Total: 11.94 km^{2} (4.61 sq mi)
- Elevation: 71 m (233 ft)

Population (2011-12-31)
  - Total: 467
  - Density: 39.1/km^{2} (101/sq mi)
- Time zone: UTC+01:00 (CET)
  - Summer (DST): UTC+02:00 (CEST)
- Postal codes: 17194
- Dialling codes: 03991
- Vehicle registration: MÜR

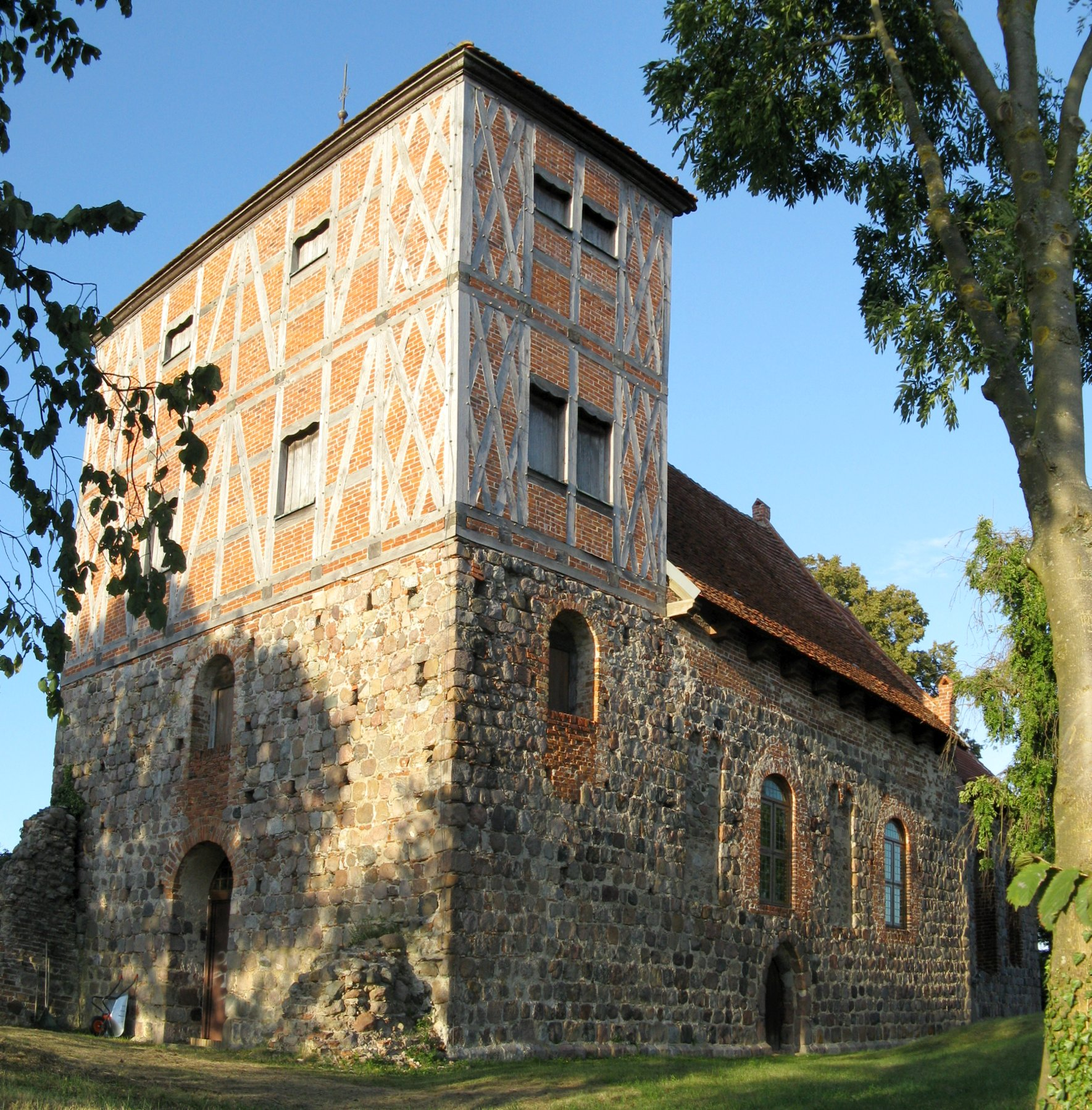
Vielist Kirche 2009-08-31

Vielist is a village and a former municipality in the Mecklenburgische Seenplatte district, in Mecklenburg-Vorpommern, Germany. Since 1 January 2013, it is part of the municipality Grabowhöfe.
