= Schwinkendorf =

- Ortsteil of Moltzow
- Interactive map of Schwinkendorf
- Location within Germany Location within Mecklenburg-Vorpommern
- Coordinates: 53°38′12″N 12°40′59″E
- Country: Germany
- State: Mecklenburg-Vorpommern
- District: Mecklenburgische Seenplatte
- Municipality: Moltzow

Area
  - Total: 28.46 km^{2} (10.99 sq mi)
- Elevation: 60 m (200 ft)

Population (2011-12-31)
  - Total: 528
  - Density: 18.6/km^{2} (48.1/sq mi)
- Time zone: UTC+01:00 (CET)
  - Summer (DST): UTC+02:00 (CEST)
- Postal codes: 17139
- Dialling codes: 039953
- Vehicle registration: MÜR

Schwinkendorf is a former municipality in the Mecklenburgische Seenplatte district, in Mecklenburg-Vorpommern, Germany. Since 1 January 2013, it is part of the municipality Moltzow.
