= Grubenhagen Castle =

Grubenhagen Castle is the name of the following castles in Germany:

- Grubenhagen Castle (Einbeck), a ruined castle near Einbeck, Lower Saxony
- Grubenhagen Castle (Vollrathsruhe), a ruined castle in Schloß Grubenhagen, Mecklenburg-Western Pomerania
