= Hinrichshagen, Müritz =

Hinrichshagen
- Ortsteil of Peenehagen
- Interactive map of Hinrichshagen
- Location within Germany Location within Mecklenburg-Vorpommern
- Coordinates: 53°37′N 12°40′E
- Country: Germany
- State: Mecklenburg-Vorpommern
- District: Mecklenburgische Seenplatte
- Municipality: Peenehagen

Area
  - Total: 14.90 km^{2} (5.75 sq mi)
- Elevation: 67 m (220 ft)

Population (2010-12-31)
  - Total: 152
  - Density: 10.2/km^{2} (26.4/sq mi)
- Time zone: UTC+01:00 (CET)
  - Summer (DST): UTC+02:00 (CEST)
- Postal codes: 17194
- Dialling codes: 039953
- Vehicle registration: MÜR
- Website: www.amt-slw.de

Hinrichshagen is a village and a former municipality in the Mecklenburgische Seenplatte district, in Mecklenburg-Vorpommern, Germany. Since 1 January 2012, it is part of the municipality Peenehagen.
