= Franz Barwig =

Austrian sculptor

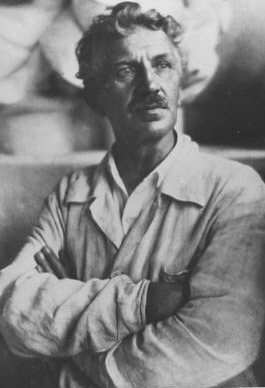
- Born: 19 April 1868; Šenov u Nového Jičína, Austria-Hungary
- Died: 15 May 1931 (aged 63); Vienna, Austria
- Occupation: Sculptor

Franz Barwig (19 April 1868 – 15 May 1931) was an Austrian sculptor.

== Professional career ==
His work was part of the sculpture event in the art competition at the 1928 Summer Olympics.

== Death ==
He committed suicide by shooting himself in 1931.
