= Peenehagen =

- Municipality
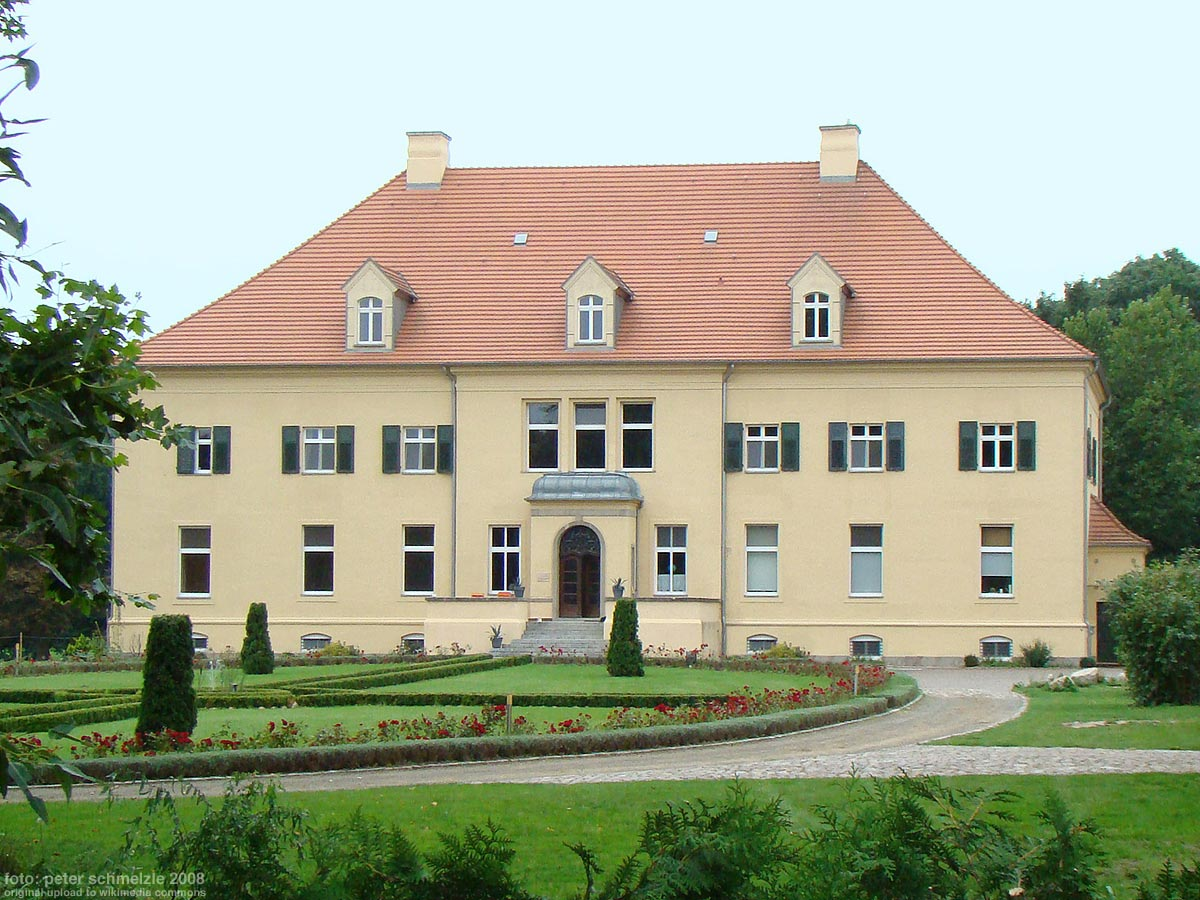
- Groß Gievitz Manor in Peenehagen

- Location of Peenehagen within Mecklenburgische Seenplatte district
- Interactive map of Peenehagen
- Location within Germany Location within Mecklenburg-Vorpommern
- Coordinates: 53°36′N 12°44′E
- Country: Germany
- State: Mecklenburg-Vorpommern
- District: Mecklenburgische Seenplatte
- Municipal assoc.: Seenlandschaft Waren

Area
  - Total: 54.58 km^{2} (21.07 sq mi)
- Elevation: 67 m (220 ft)

Population (2025-12-31)
  - Total: 981
  - Density: 18.0/km^{2} (46.6/sq mi)
- Time zone: UTC+01:00 (CET)
  - Summer (DST): UTC+02:00 (CEST)
- Postal codes: 17192, 17194
- Dialling codes: 039934, 039953
- Vehicle registration: MÜR
- Website: www.amt-slw.de

Peenehagen is a municipality in the Mecklenburgische Seenplatte district, in Mecklenburg-Vorpommern, Germany. It was formed on 1 January 2012 by the merger of the former municipalities Groß Gievitz, Hinrichshagen and Lansen-Schönau.

Peenehagen has a population of 1,067 and covers a total area of 5,456.89 hectare.
