= Neu Gaarz =

- Ortsteil of Jabel
- Interactive map of Neu Gaarz
- Location within Germany Location within Mecklenburg-Vorpommern
- Coordinates: 53°35′N 12°32′E
- Country: Germany
- State: Mecklenburg-Vorpommern
- District: Mecklenburgische Seenplatte
- Municipality: Jabel

Area
  - Total: 13.34 km^{2} (5.15 sq mi)
- Elevation: 78 m (256 ft)

Population (2013-12-31)
  - Total: 87
  - Density: 6.5/km^{2} (17/sq mi)
- Time zone: UTC+01:00 (CET)
  - Summer (DST): UTC+02:00 (CEST)
- Postal codes: 17194
- Dialling codes: 039933
- Vehicle registration: MÜR
- Website: www.amt-slw.de

Neu Gaarz is a village and a former municipality of the Mecklenburgische Seenplatte district, in Mecklenburg-Vorpommern, Germany. Since 1 January 2015 it has been part of the municipality of Jabel.
