= Seenlandschaft Waren =

- Amt
- Map of Mecklenburgische Seenplatte highlighting Seenlandschaft Waren
- Interactive map of Seenlandschaft Waren
- Location within Germany Location within Mecklenburg-Vorpommern
- Coordinates: 53°36′N 12°37′E
- Country: Germany
- State: Mecklenburg-Vorpommern
- District: Mecklenburgische Seenplatte
- Seat: Waren
- Subdivisions: 12 municipalities

Area
  - Total: 503.67 km^{2} (194.47 sq mi)

Population (2025-12-31)
  - Total: 8,891
  - Density: 17.65/km^{2} (45.72/sq mi)
- Time zone: UTC+01:00 (CET)
  - Summer (DST): UTC+02:00 (CEST)
- Website: www.amt-slw.de

Seenlandschaft Waren is an Amt in the Mecklenburgische Seenplatte district, in Mecklenburg-Vorpommern, Germany. The seat of the Amt is in Waren, itself not part of the Amt.

The Amt Seenlandschaft Waren consists of the following municipalities:

1. Grabowhöfe
2. Groß Plasten
3. Hohen Wangelin
4. Jabel
5. Kargow
6. Klink
7. Klocksin
8. Moltzow
9. Peenehagen
10. Schloen-Dratow
11. Torgelow am See
12. Vollrathsruhe
