= Groß Dratow =

- Ortsteil of Dratow-Schloen
- Interactive map of Groß Dratow
- Location within Germany Location within Mecklenburg-Vorpommern
- Coordinates: 53°31′N 12°49′E
- Country: Germany
- State: Mecklenburg-Vorpommern
- District: Mecklenburgische Seenplatte
- Municipality: Dratow-Schloen

Area
  - Total: 25.77 km^{2} (9.95 sq mi)
- Elevation: 74 m (243 ft)

Population (2011-12-31)
  - Total: 356
  - Density: 13.8/km^{2} (35.8/sq mi)
- Time zone: UTC+01:00 (CET)
  - Summer (DST): UTC+02:00 (CEST)
- Postal codes: 17192
- Dialling codes: 039934
- Vehicle registration: MÜR
- Website: www.amt-slw.de

Groß Dratow is a village and a former municipality in the Mecklenburgische Seenplatte district, in Mecklenburg-Vorpommern, Germany. Since 1 January 2012, it is part of the municipality Dratow-Schloen.
