= Groß Gievitz =

- Ortsteil of Peenehagen
- Coat of arms
- Interactive map of Groß Gievitz
- Location within Germany Location within Mecklenburg-Vorpommern
- Coordinates: 53°34′N 12°46′E
- Country: Germany
- State: Mecklenburg-Vorpommern
- District: Mecklenburgische Seenplatte
- Municipality: Peenehagen

Area
  - Total: 19.87 km^{2} (7.67 sq mi)
- Elevation: 47 m (154 ft)

Population (2010-12-31)
  - Total: 470
  - Density: 24/km^{2} (61/sq mi)
- Time zone: UTC+01:00 (CET)
  - Summer (DST): UTC+02:00 (CEST)
- Postal codes: 17192
- Dialling codes: 039934
- Vehicle registration: MÜR
- Website: www.amt-slw.de

Groß Gievitz is a village and a former municipality in the Mecklenburgische Seenplatte district, in Mecklenburg-Vorpommern, Germany. Since 1 January 2012, it is part of the municipality Peenehagen.
