= Hohen Wangelin =

- Municipality
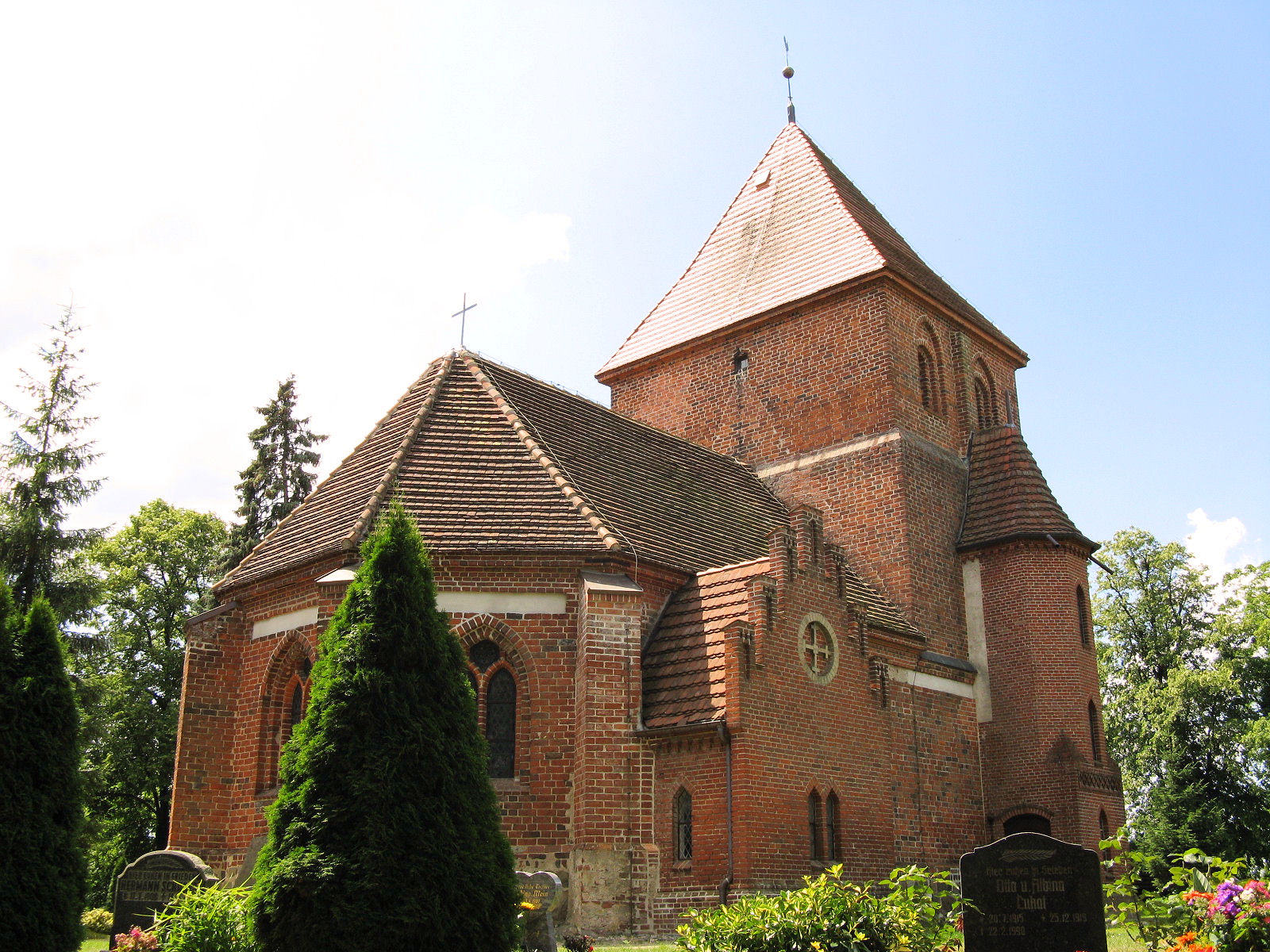
- Church in Hohen Wangelin

- Location of Hohen Wangelin within Mecklenburgische Seenplatte district
- Interactive map of Hohen Wangelin
- Location within Germany Location within Mecklenburg-Vorpommern
- Coordinates: 53°37′N 12°25′E
- Country: Germany
- State: Mecklenburg-Vorpommern
- District: Mecklenburgische Seenplatte
- Municipal assoc.: Seenlandschaft Waren

Government
  - Mayor: Torsten Nörenberg

Area
  - Total: 43.84 km^{2} (16.93 sq mi)
- Elevation: 58 m (190 ft)

Population (2025-12-31)
  - Total: 520
  - Density: 12/km^{2} (31/sq mi)
- Time zone: UTC+01:00 (CET)
  - Summer (DST): UTC+02:00 (CEST)
- Postal codes: 17194
- Dialling codes: 039933
- Vehicle registration: MÜR
- Website: www.amt-slw.de

Hohen Wangelin is a municipality in the Mecklenburgische Seenplatte district, in Mecklenburg-Vorpommern, Germany.
