= Hofsee (Kargow) =

Lake in Germany

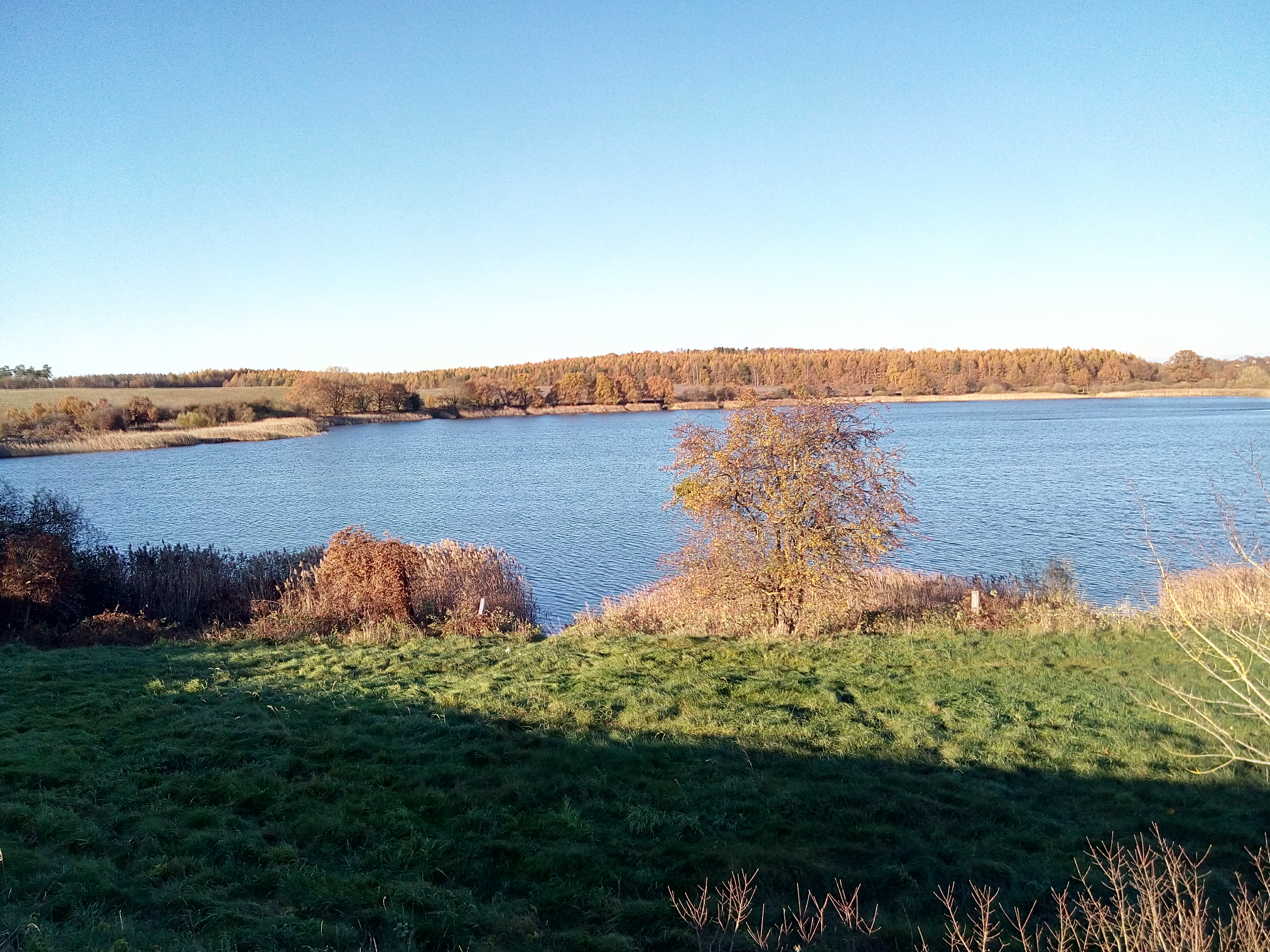

- Location within Mecklenburg-Vorpommern
- Location: Kargow, Mecklenburgische Seenplatte, Mecklenburg-Vorpommern
- Coordinates: 53°30′05″N 12°46′08″E
- Basin countries: Germany
- Surface area: 0.147 km^{2} (0.057 sq mi)
- Surface elevation: 65 m (213 ft)

Hofsee is a lake at Kargow in Mecklenburgische Seenplatte, Mecklenburg-Vorpommern, Germany. At an elevation of 65 m, its surface area is 0.147 km².
