= Hofsee (Neu Gaarz) =

Lake in Mecklenburg-Vorpommern, Germany

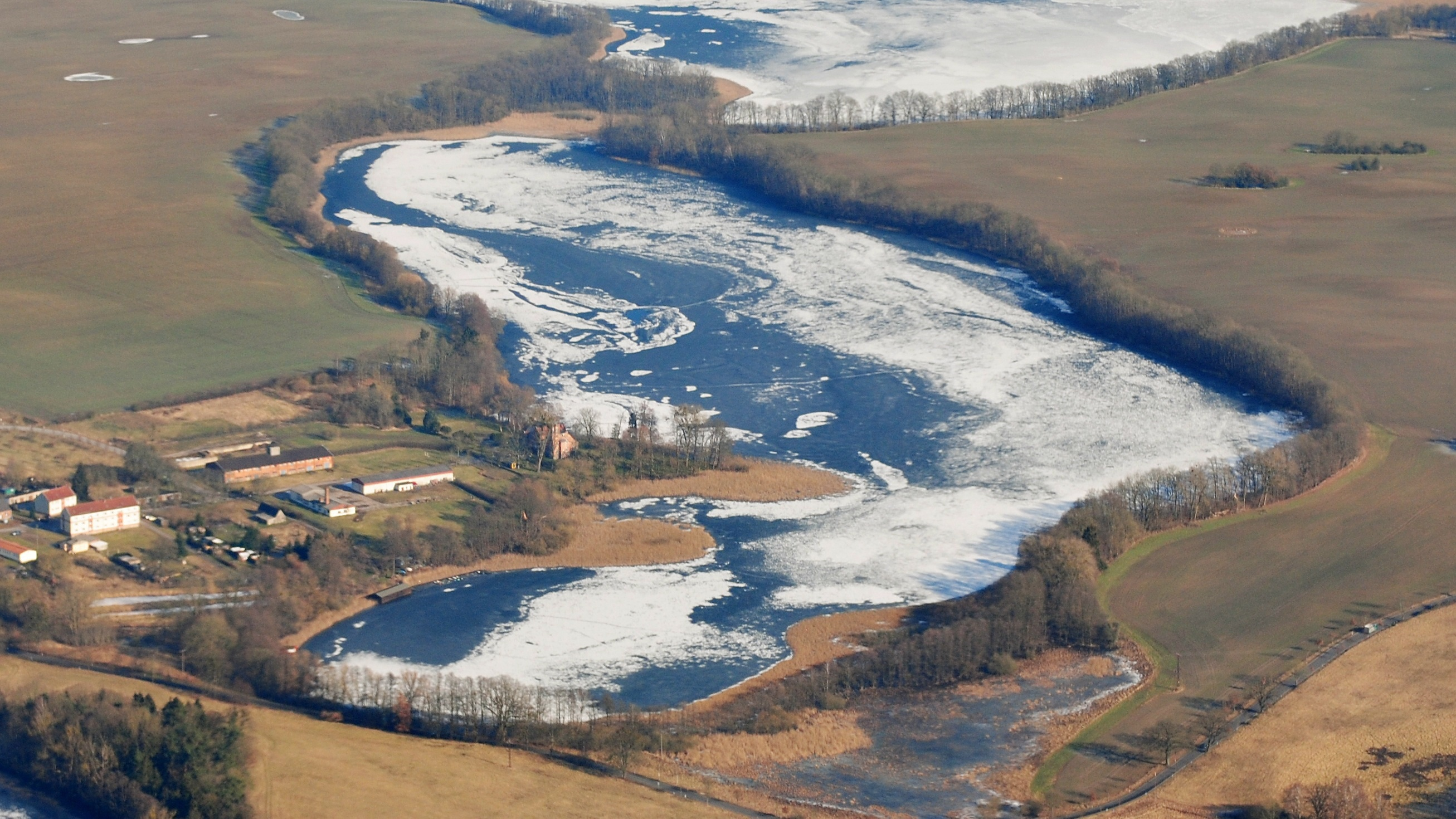

- Location within Mecklenburg-Vorpommern
- Location: Neu Gaarz, Mecklenburgische Seenplatte, Mecklenburg-Vorpommern
- Coordinates: 53°35′7″N 12°31′2″E
- Basin countries: Germany
- Surface area: 0.44 km^{2} (0.17 sq mi)
- Max. depth: 20 m (66 ft)
- Surface elevation: 62.9 m (206 ft)
- Settlements: Alt Gaarz

Hofsee is a lake at Alt Gaarz, municipality Neu Gaarz, in Mecklenburgische Seenplatte, Mecklenburg-Vorpommern, Germany. At an elevation of 62.9 m, its surface area is 0.44 km².
