= Schloen-Dratow =

- Municipality
- Location of Schloen-Dratow within Mecklenburgische Seenplatte district
- Interactive map of Schloen-Dratow
- Location within Germany Location within Mecklenburg-Vorpommern
- Coordinates: 53°31′N 12°49′E
- Country: Germany
- State: Mecklenburg-Vorpommern
- District: Mecklenburgische Seenplatte
- Municipal assoc.: Seenlandschaft Waren

Area
  - Total: 36.12 km^{2} (13.95 sq mi)
- Elevation: 62 m (203 ft)

Population (2025-12-31)
  - Total: 817
  - Density: 22.6/km^{2} (58.6/sq mi)
- Time zone: UTC+01:00 (CET)
  - Summer (DST): UTC+02:00 (CEST)
- Postal codes: 17192, 17219
- Dialling codes: 039934
- Vehicle registration: MÜR

Schloen-Dratow (before January 2014: Dratow-Schloen) is a municipality in the Mecklenburgische Seenplatte district, Mecklenburg-Vorpommern, Germany. It was formed on 1 January 2012 by the merger of the former municipalities Groß Dratow and Schloen.
