= Torgelow am See =

- Municipality
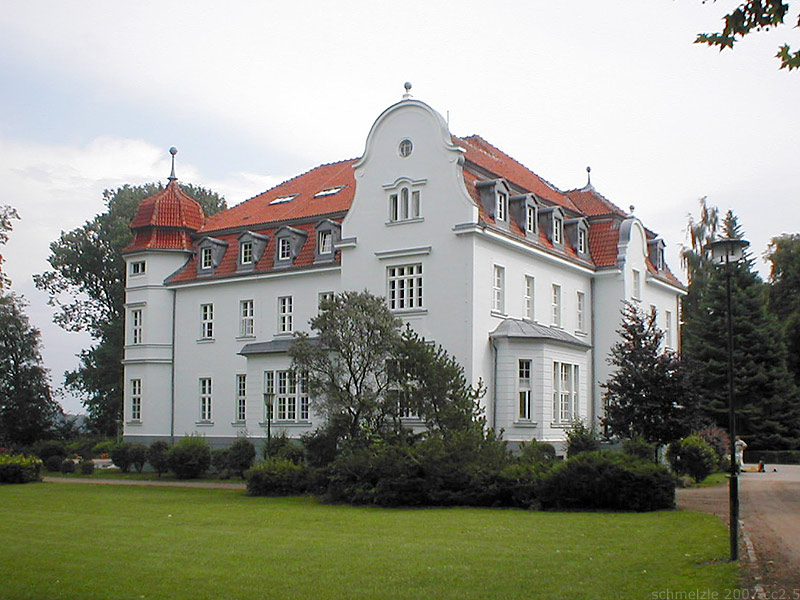
- Schloss Torgelow, private school

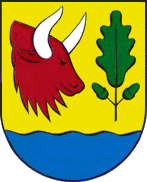
- Coat of arms

- Location of Torgelow am See within Mecklenburgische Seenplatte district
- Interactive map of Torgelow am See
- Location within Germany Location within Mecklenburg-Vorpommern
- Coordinates: 53°33′36″N 12°46′47″E
- Country: Germany
- State: Mecklenburg-Vorpommern
- District: Mecklenburgische Seenplatte
- Municipal assoc.: Seenlandschaft Waren

Government
  - Mayor: Manfred Kucklick

Area
  - Total: 14.28 km^{2} (5.51 sq mi)
- Elevation: 37 m (121 ft)

Population (2025-12-31)
  - Total: 417
  - Density: 29.2/km^{2} (75.6/sq mi)
- Time zone: UTC+01:00 (CET)
  - Summer (DST): UTC+02:00 (CEST)
- Postal codes: 17192
- Dialling codes: 03991
- Vehicle registration: MÜR
- Website: www.amt-slw.de

Torgelow am See is a municipality in the Mecklenburgische Seenplatte district, in Mecklenburg-Vorpommern, Germany. It is part of the Seenlandschaft Waren Amt, that is based in the nearby town of Waren.

The Schloss Torgelow is home to one of Germany's most renowned private schools, the Internatsgymnasium Schloss Torgelow.
