= Hofsee (Speck) =

Lake in Kargow, Mecklenburg-Vorpommern, Germany

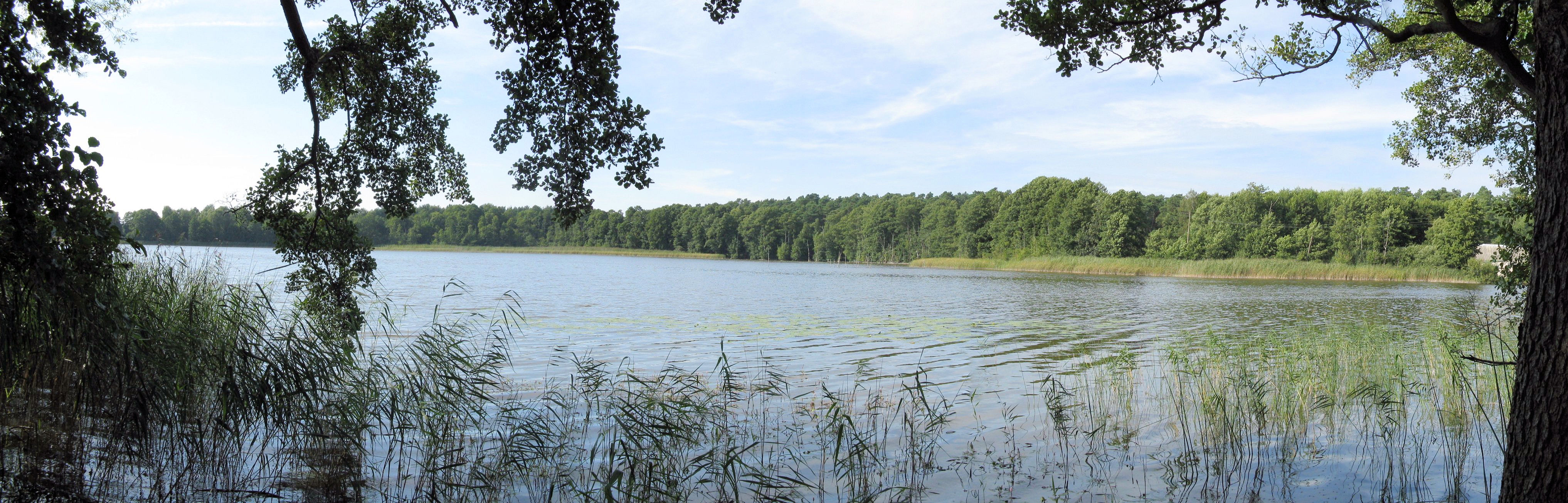

- Location within Mecklenburg-Vorpommern
- Location: Speck, Kargow, Mecklenburgische Seenplatte, Mecklenburg-Vorpommern
- Coordinates: 53°25′47.97″N 12°49′25.65″E
- Basin countries: Germany
- Surface area: 1.15 km^{2} (0.44 sq mi)
- Surface elevation: 62.5 m (205 ft)

Hofsee is a lake at Speck, Kargow, Mecklenburgische Seenplatte, Mecklenburg-Vorpommern, Germany. At an elevation of 62.5 m, its surface area is 1.15 km^{2}.
