= Grabowhöfe =

- Municipality
- Coat of arms

- Location of Grabowhöfe within Mecklenburgische Seenplatte district
- Interactive map of Grabowhöfe
- Location within Germany Location within Mecklenburg-Vorpommern
- Coordinates: 53°34′N 12°35′E
- Country: Germany
- State: Mecklenburg-Vorpommern
- District: Mecklenburgische Seenplatte
- Municipal assoc.: Seenlandschaft Waren

Government
  - Mayor: Elke Schult

Area
  - Total: 43.06 km^{2} (16.63 sq mi)
- Elevation: 68 m (223 ft)

Population (2025-12-31)
  - Total: 1,282
  - Density: 29.77/km^{2} (77.11/sq mi)
- Time zone: UTC+01:00 (CET)
  - Summer (DST): UTC+02:00 (CEST)
- Postal codes: 17194
- Dialling codes: 03991, 039926
- Vehicle registration: MÜR
- Website: www.amt-slw.de

Grabowhöfe is a municipality in the Mecklenburgische Seenplatte district, in Mecklenburg-Vorpommern, Germany.
