= Jabel =

- Municipality
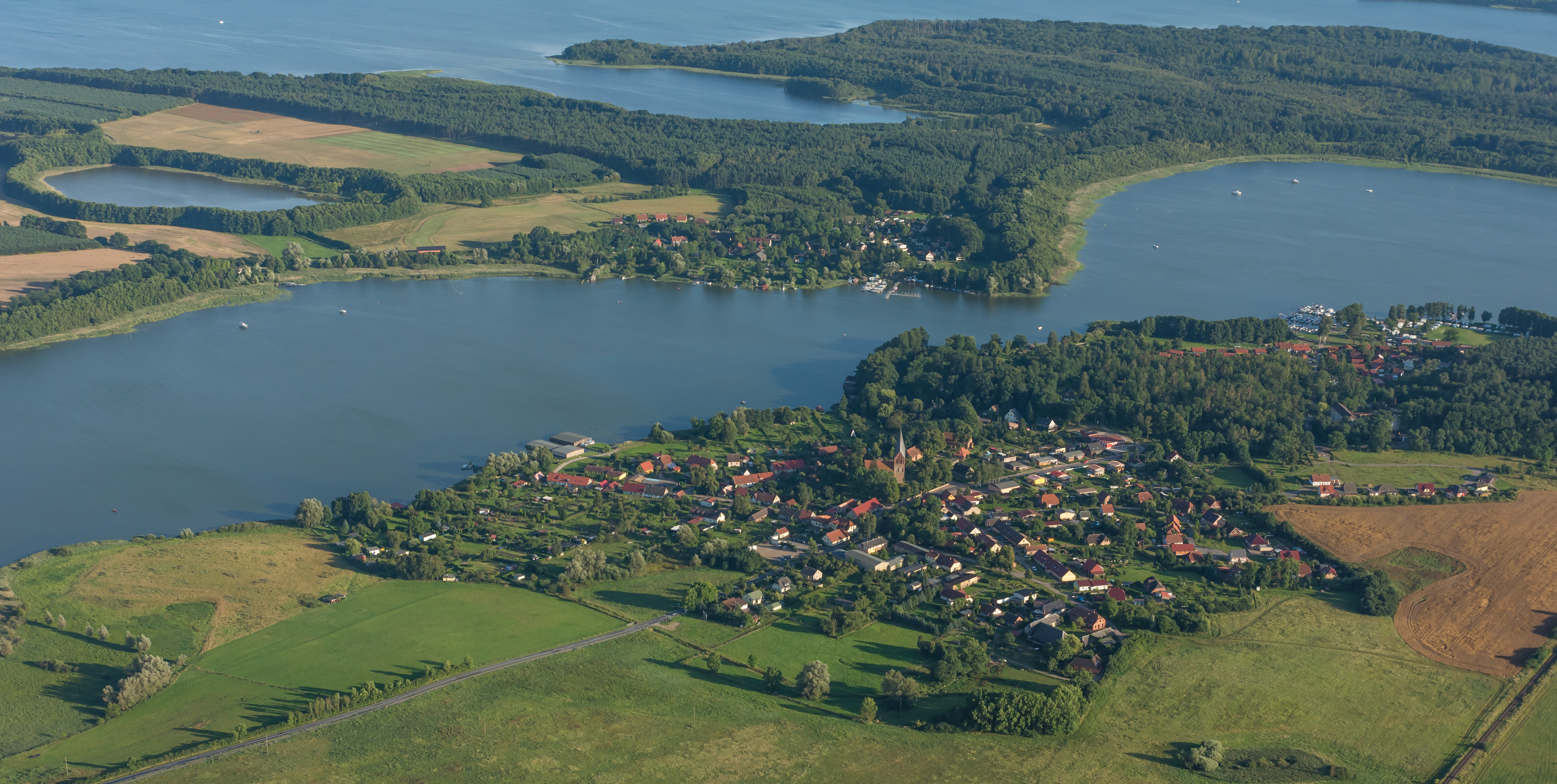
- Jabel

- Coat of arms

- Location of Jabel within Mecklenburgische Seenplatte district
- Interactive map of Jabel
- Location within Germany Location within Mecklenburg-Vorpommern
- Coordinates: 53°32′12″N 12°32′48″E
- Country: Germany
- State: Mecklenburg-Vorpommern
- District: Mecklenburgische Seenplatte
- Municipal assoc.: Seenlandschaft Waren

Government
  - Mayor: Johannes Güssmer

Area
  - Total: 80.02 km^{2} (30.90 sq mi)
- Elevation: 72 m (236 ft)

Population (2025-12-31)
  - Total: 616
  - Density: 7.70/km^{2} (19.9/sq mi)
- Time zone: UTC+01:00 (CET)
  - Summer (DST): UTC+02:00 (CEST)
- Postal codes: 17194
- Dialling codes: 039929
- Vehicle registration: MÜR
- Website: www.amt-slw.de

Jabel (German pronunciation: [ˈjaːbl̩]) is a municipality in the Mecklenburgische Seenplatte district, in Mecklenburg-Vorpommern, Germany.
