= Hofsee (Zurow) =

Lake in Zurow, Germany

- Location within Mecklenburg-Vorpommern
- Location: Nordwestmecklenburg, Mecklenburg-Vorpommern
- Coordinates: 53.8601°N 11.61613°E
- Basin countries: Germany
- Surface area: 0.1 km^{2} (0.039 sq mi)
- Surface elevation: 49.2 m (161 ft)

Hofsee (Zurow) is a lake in the Nordwestmecklenburg district in Mecklenburg-Vorpommern, Germany. At an elevation of 49.2 m, its surface area is 0.1 km^{2}.
