= Hofsee (Federow) =

Lake

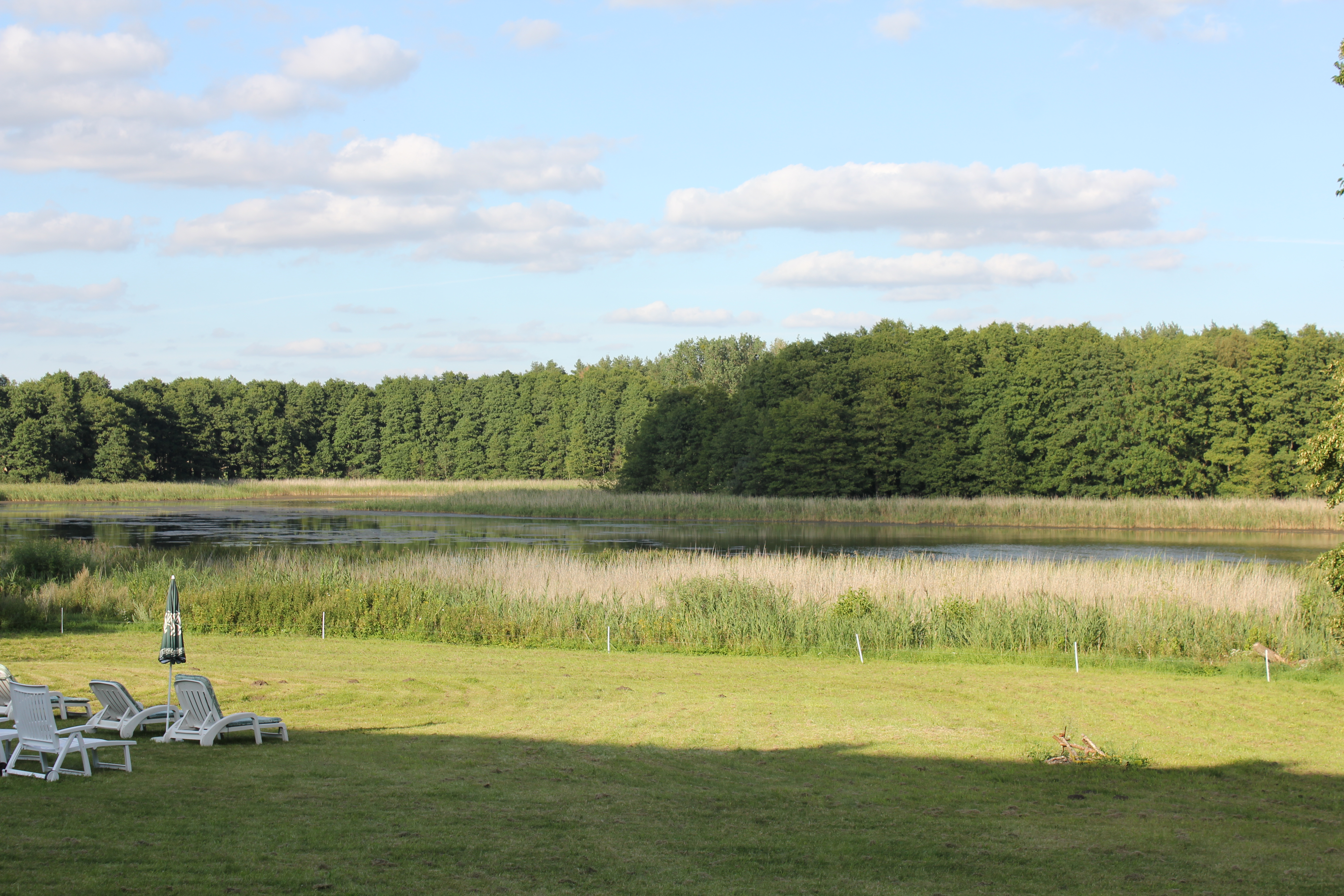

- Location within Mecklenburg-Vorpommern
- Location: Mecklenburgische Seenplatte, Mecklenburg-Vorpommern
- Coordinates: 53°29′07″N 12°45′58″E
- Basin countries: Germany
- Surface area: 0.139 km^{2} (0.054 sq mi)
- Surface elevation: 65 m (213 ft)

Hofsee (Federow) is a lake in the Mecklenburgische Seenplatte district in Mecklenburg-Vorpommern, Germany. At an elevation of 65 m, its surface area is 0.139 km^{2}.
