= Hofsee (Satow) =

Lake in Mecklenburgische Seenplatte District, Germany

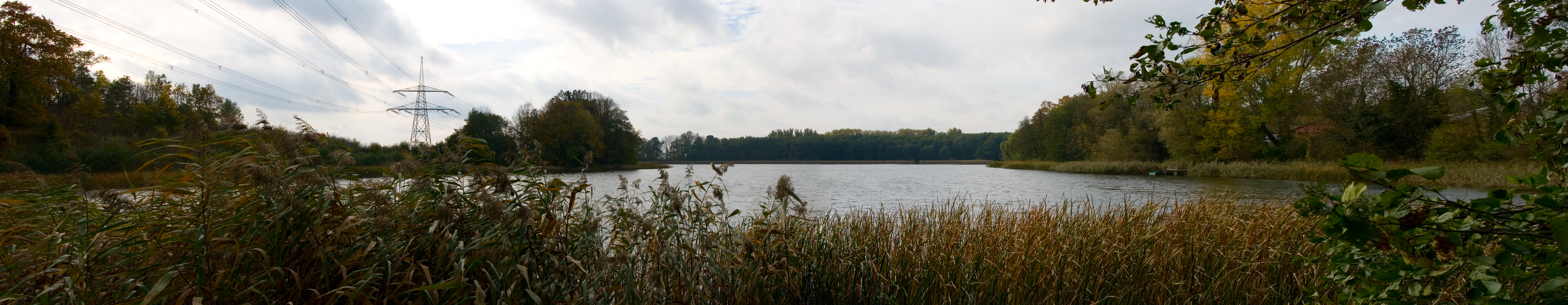

- Location within Mecklenburg-Vorpommern
- Location: Satow, Fünfseen, Mecklenburgische Seenplatte, Mecklenburg-Vorpommern
- Coordinates: 53.405848°N 12.382815°E
- Basin countries: Germany
- Surface area: 0.127 km^{2} (0.049 sq mi)
- Surface elevation: 90.3 m (296 ft)

Hofsee is a lake at Satow, Fünfseen, Mecklenburgische Seenplatte, Mecklenburg-Vorpommern, Germany. At an elevation of 90.3 m, its surface area is 0.127 km².
