= Šenov u Nového Jičína =

- Municipality
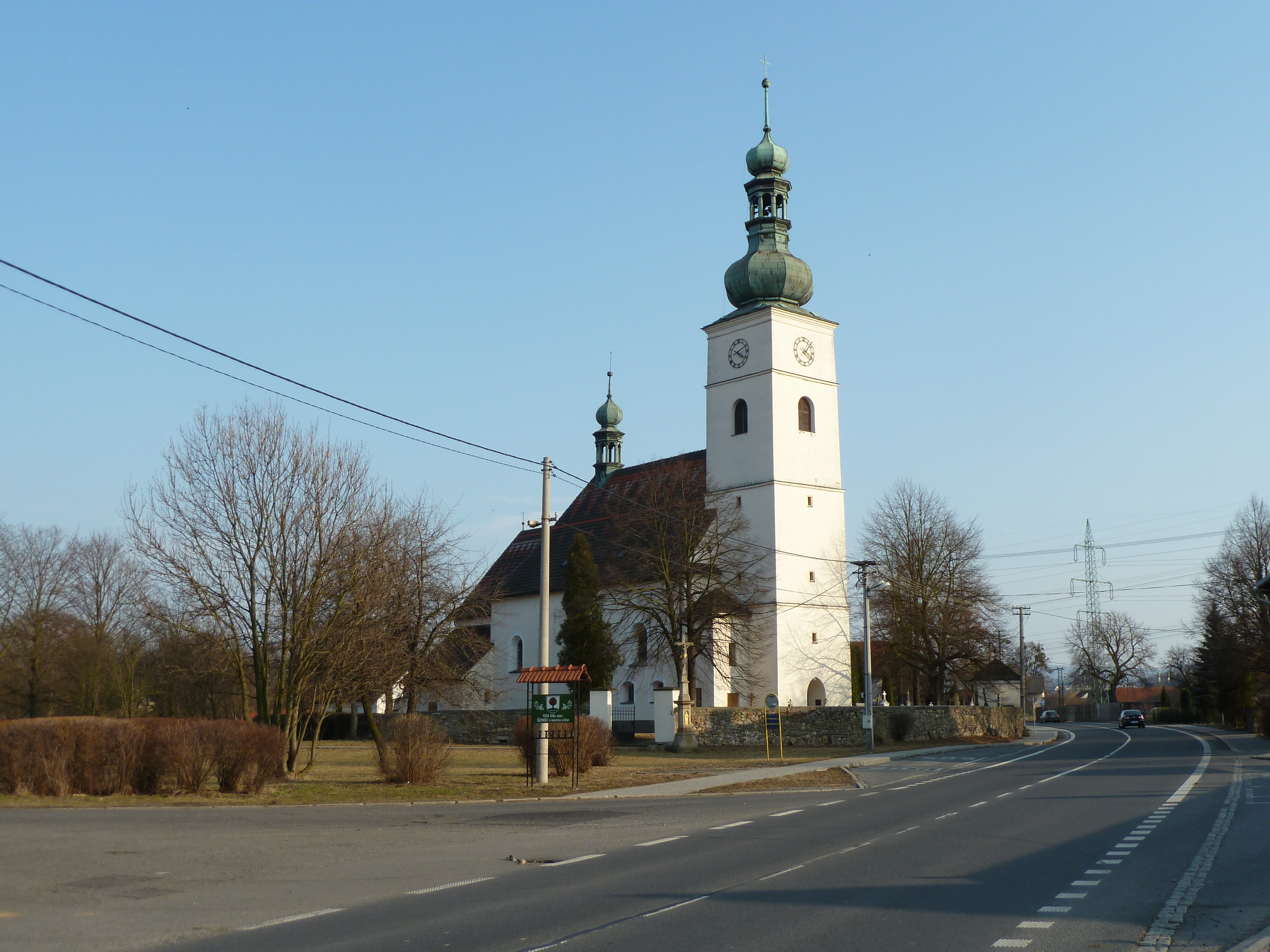
- Church of Saint Martin

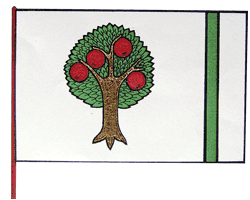
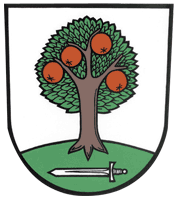
- Flag Coat of arms

- Location in the Czech Republic
- Coordinates: 49°36′16″N 18°0′12″E
- Country: Czech Republic
- Region: Moravian-Silesian
- District: Nový Jičín
- First mentioned: 1383

Area
  - Total: 15.63 km^{2} (6.03 sq mi)
- Elevation: 260 m (850 ft)

Population (2026-01-01)
  - Total: 2,088
  - Density: 133.6/km^{2} (346.0/sq mi)
- Time zone: UTC+1 (CET)
  - Summer (DST): UTC+2 (CEST)
- Postal code: 742 42
- Website: www.senovunovehojicina.cz

Šenov u Nového Jičína (German: Schönau) is a municipality and village in Nový Jičín District in the Moravian-Silesian Region of the Czech Republic. It has about 2,100 inhabitants.

== Geography ==
Šenov u Nového Jičína is located north of Nový Jičín and is urbanistically fused with this town. It is located 26 km (16 mi) southwest of Ostrava. It lies mostly in the Moravian-Silesian Foothills, only a small part of the municipal territory extends into the Moravian Gate. The highest point is at 346 m (1,135 ft) above sea level. The Jičínka River flows through the municipality. The northwestern part of the municipal territory lies within the Poodří Protected Landscape Area.

== History ==
The first written mention of Šenov is from 1383.

From 1949 to 1993, it was a municipal part of Nový Jičín.

== Demographics ==
Historical population

Year	Pop.	±%
1869	1,267	—
1880	1,631	+28.7%
1890	2,105	+29.1%
1900	2,584	+22.8%
1910	2,964	+14.7%

Year	Pop.	±%
1921	2,766	−6.7%
1930	3,218	+16.3%
1950	2,450	−23.9%
1961	2,600	+6.1%
1970	2,484	−4.5%

Year	Pop.	±%
1980	2,300	−7.4%
1991	1,946	−15.4%
2001	1,957	+0.6%
2011	2,021	+3.3%
2021	2,001	−1.0%

Source: Censuses

== Economy ==
PO Lighting Czech, a manufacturer of lighting systems for automotive industry, has its headquarters and a production plant in the municipality.

== Transport ==
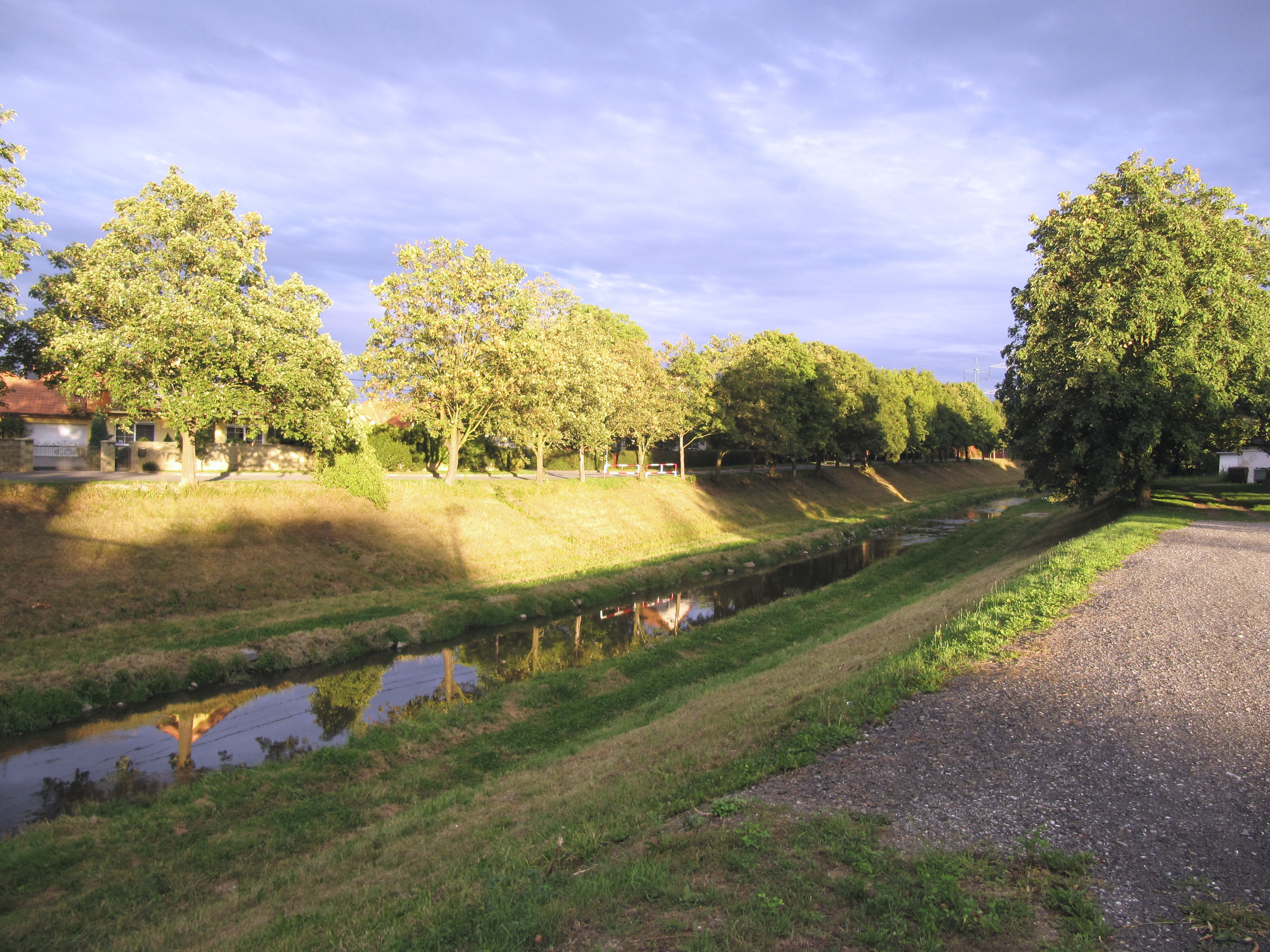
Jičínka River in the municipality

Šenov u Nového Jičína is situated at the crossroads of two main roads: the I/48, which replaces the unfinished section of the D48 motorway, and the I/57 (the section from Nový Jičín from Opava).

Šenov u Nového Jičína is located on a short railway line of local importance from Nový Jičín to Suchdol nad Odrou.

== Sights ==
The main landmark of the municipality is the Church of Saint Martin. It is originally a Gothic church from the turn of the 13th and 14th centuries, rebuilt in the Baroque style in the mid-18th century.

== Notable people ==
- Franz Barwig (1868–1931), Austrian artist
