= Moltzow =

- Municipality
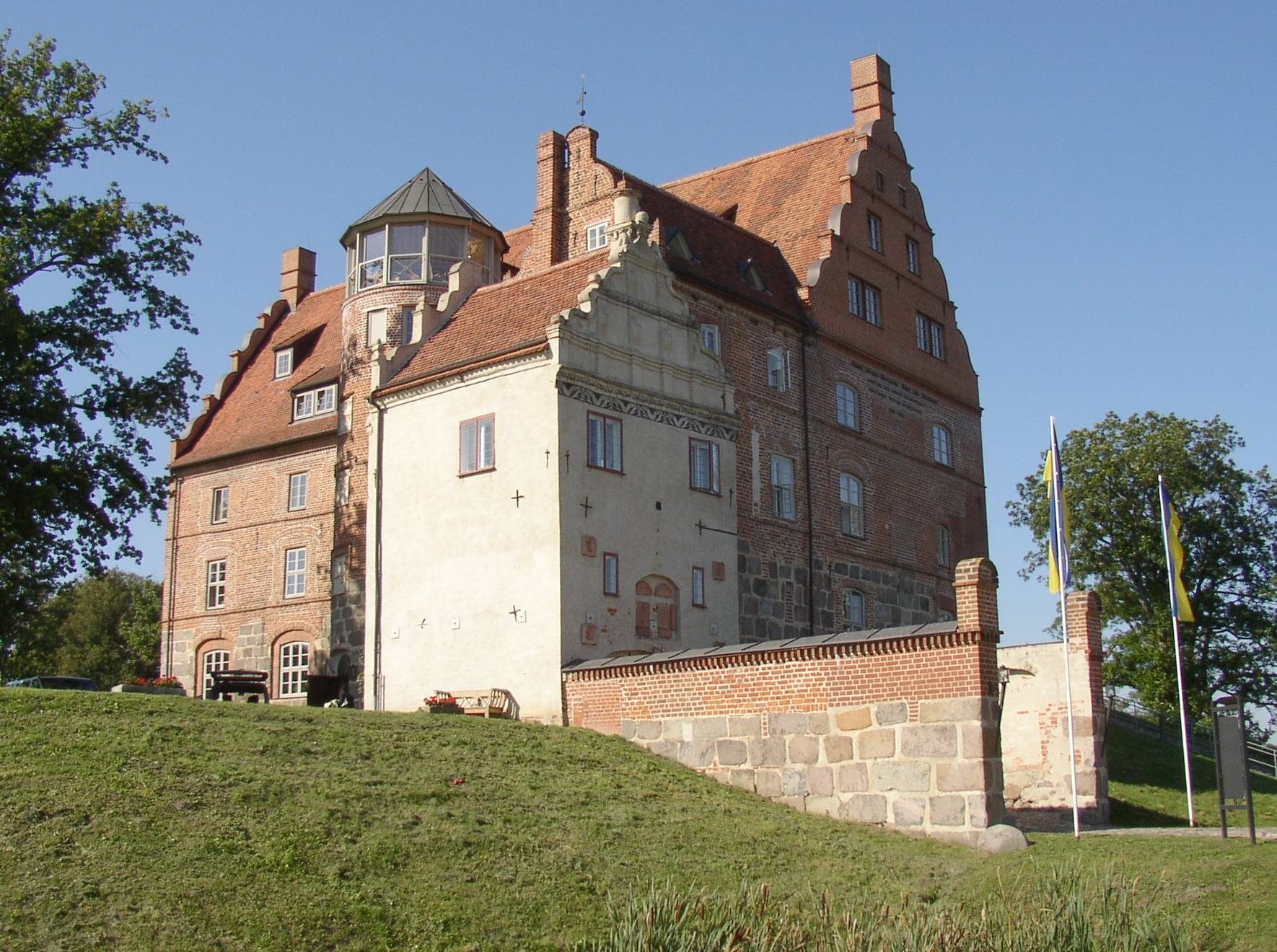
- Ulrichshusen Manor (16th century)

- Location of Moltzow within Mecklenburgische Seenplatte district
- Interactive map of Moltzow
- Location within Germany Location within Mecklenburg-Vorpommern
- Coordinates: 53°38′N 12°35′E
- Country: Germany
- State: Mecklenburg-Vorpommern
- District: Mecklenburgische Seenplatte
- Municipal assoc.: Seenlandschaft Waren

Government
  - Mayor: Wilfried Kühl

Area
  - Total: 46.54 km^{2} (17.97 sq mi)
- Elevation: 67 m (220 ft)

Population (2025-12-31)
  - Total: 807
  - Density: 17.3/km^{2} (44.9/sq mi)
- Time zone: UTC+01:00 (CET)
  - Summer (DST): UTC+02:00 (CEST)
- Postal codes: 17194
- Dialling codes: 039933
- Vehicle registration: MÜR
- Website: www.amt-slw.de

Moltzow is a municipality in the Mecklenburgische Seenplatte district, in Mecklenburg-Vorpommern, Germany.

The villages of Marxhagen, Rambow and Schwinkendorf (with Langwitz, Lupendorf, Tressow and Ulrichshusen) belong to the municipality.
