= Lansen-Schönau =

- Ortsteil of Peenehagen
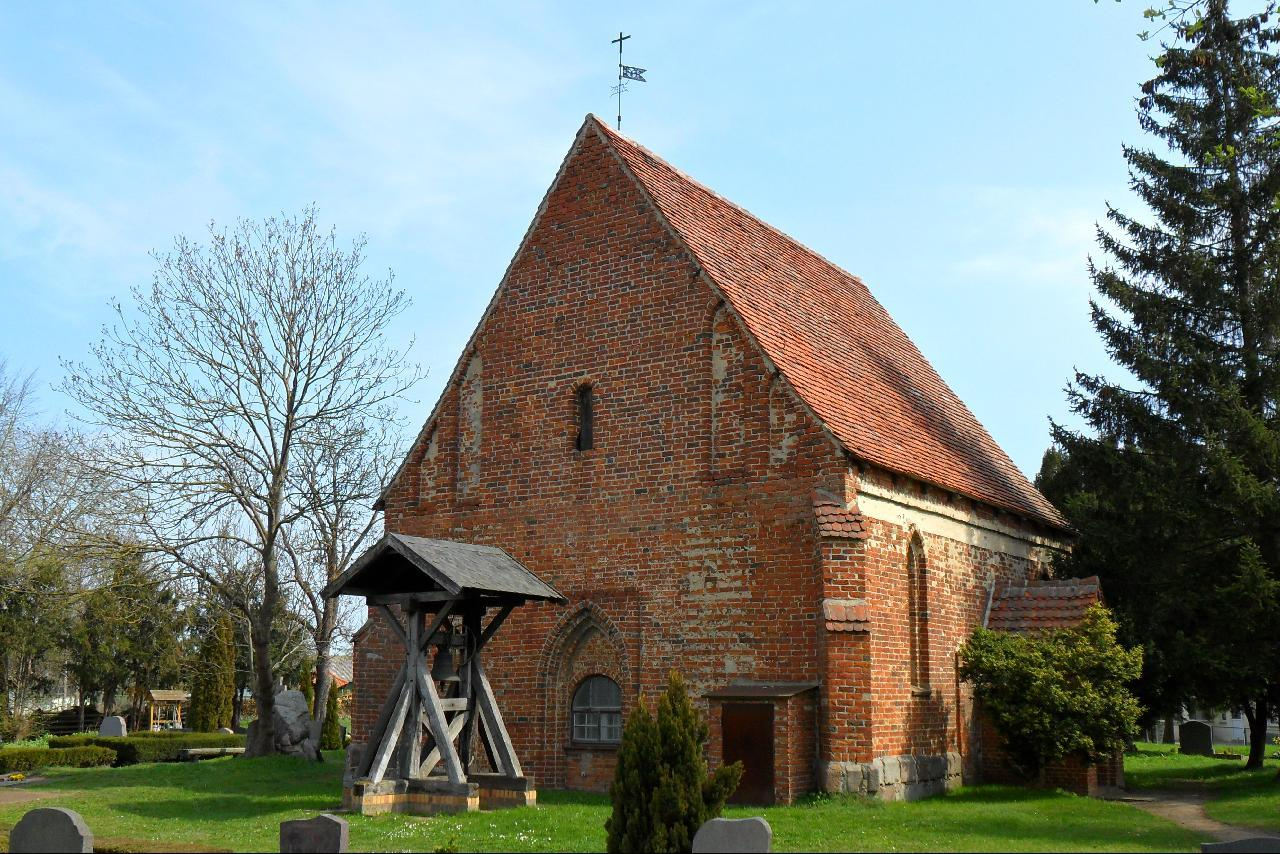
- A church in Lansen-Schönau
- Interactive map of Lansen-Schönau
- Location within Germany Location within Mecklenburg-Vorpommern
- Coordinates: 53°36′N 12°45′E
- Country: Germany
- State: Mecklenburg-Vorpommern
- District: Mecklenburgische Seenplatte
- Municipality: Peenehagen

Area
  - Total: 19.81 km^{2} (7.65 sq mi)
- Elevation: 48 m (157 ft)

Population (2010-12-31)
  - Total: 459
  - Density: 23.2/km^{2} (60.0/sq mi)
- Time zone: UTC+01:00 (CET)
  - Summer (DST): UTC+02:00 (CEST)
- Postal codes: 17192
- Dialling codes: 039934
- Vehicle registration: MÜR
- Website: www.amt-slw.de

Lansen-Schönau is a village and a former municipality in the Mecklenburgische Seenplatte district, in Mecklenburg-Vorpommern, Germany. Since 1 January 2012, it is part of the municipality Peenehagen.
