= Vollrathsruhe =

- Municipality
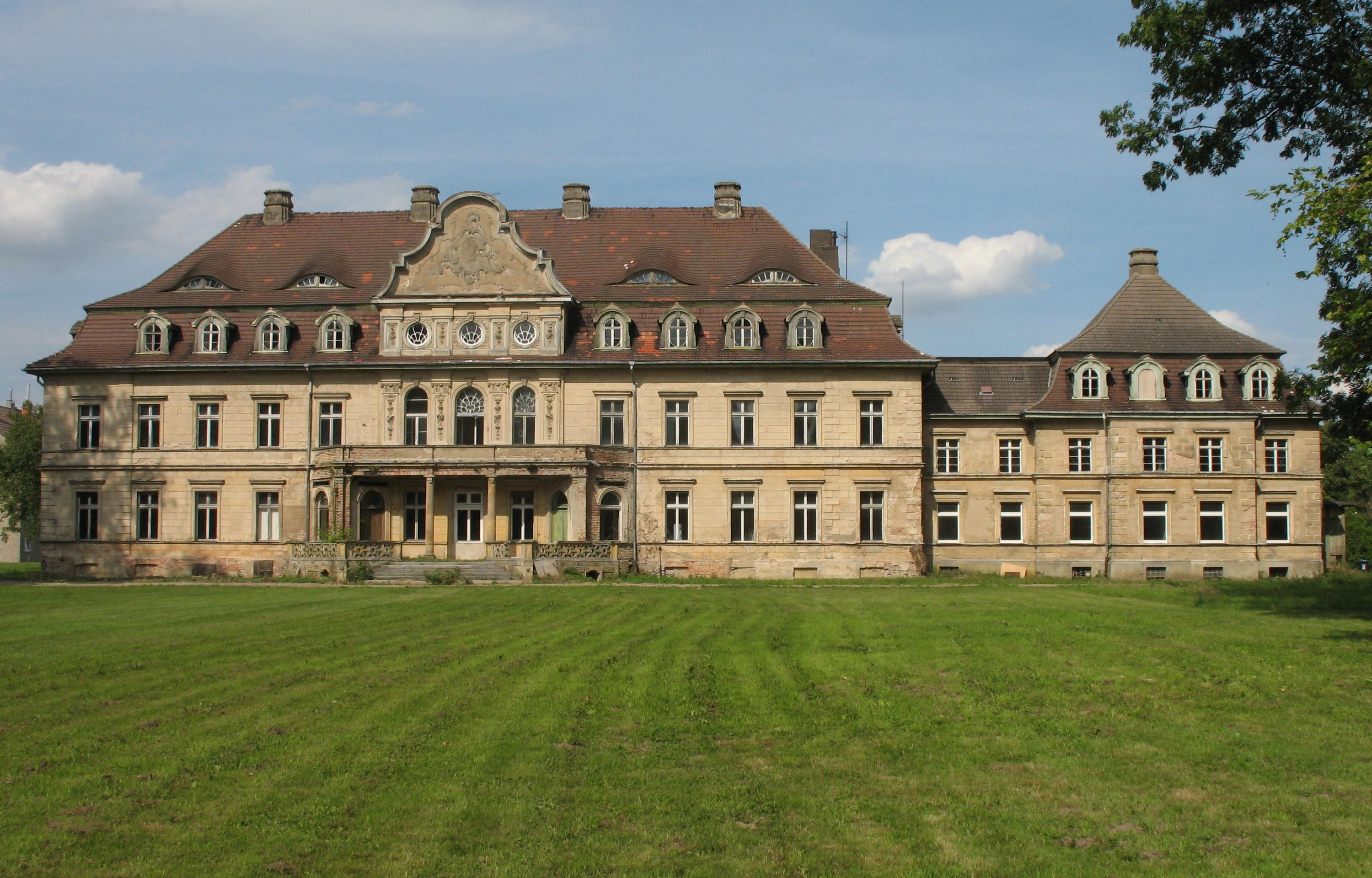
- Palace

- Location of Vollrathsruhe within Mecklenburgische Seenplatte district
- Interactive map of Vollrathsruhe
- Location within Germany Location within Mecklenburg-Vorpommern
- Coordinates: 53°38′35″N 12°29′24″E
- Country: Germany
- State: Mecklenburg-Vorpommern
- District: Mecklenburgische Seenplatte
- Municipal assoc.: Seenlandschaft Waren

Government
  - Mayor: Siegfried Grohmann

Area
  - Total: 31.24 km^{2} (12.06 sq mi)
- Elevation: 70 m (230 ft)

Population (2025-12-31)
  - Total: 373
  - Density: 11.9/km^{2} (30.9/sq mi)
- Time zone: UTC+01:00 (CET)
  - Summer (DST): UTC+02:00 (CEST)
- Postal codes: 17194
- Dialling codes: 039933
- Vehicle registration: MÜR
- Website: www.amt-slw.de

Vollrathsruhe is a municipality in the Mecklenburgische Seenplatte district, in Mecklenburg-Vorpommern, in north-eastern Germany.

== History ==
During World War II, in February 1945, a German-perpetrated death march of Allied prisoners-of-war from the Stalag XX-B POW camp passed through the village.

== Sights ==
- Village Church, Kirch Grubenhagen.
- Vollrathsruhe Estate with two-storey, 13-wing country house, park and mausoleum
- Dat lange Hus in Hallalit is of architectural interest: at 104 metres long, it is the longest fieldstone house in the region. This cottage was built in the mid-19th century for 16 families.
- Ruins of the 13th-century Grubenhagen Castle in Vollrathsruhe
- Protected central avant-corps of a building in Kirch Grubenhagen, Teterower Str. 3
- Schloss Grubenhagen country house and park
- Hellgrund Nature Reserve, Klein Rehberg and
- Wüste und Glase Nature Reserve in Klein Luckow with a Bronze Age/Slavic burgwall.

== Gallery ==
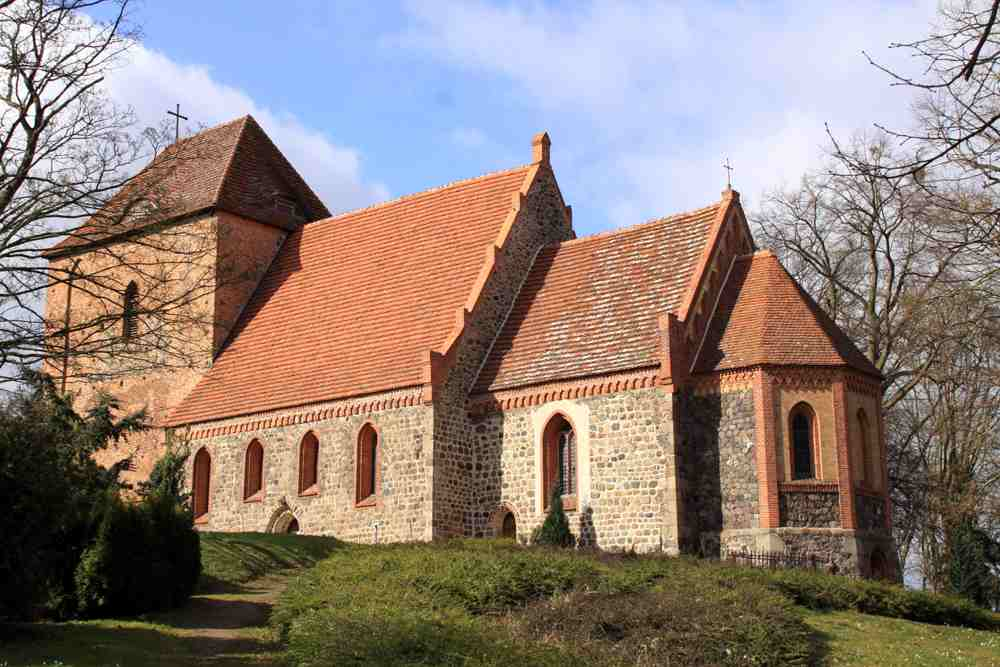
Church in Kirch Grubenhagen

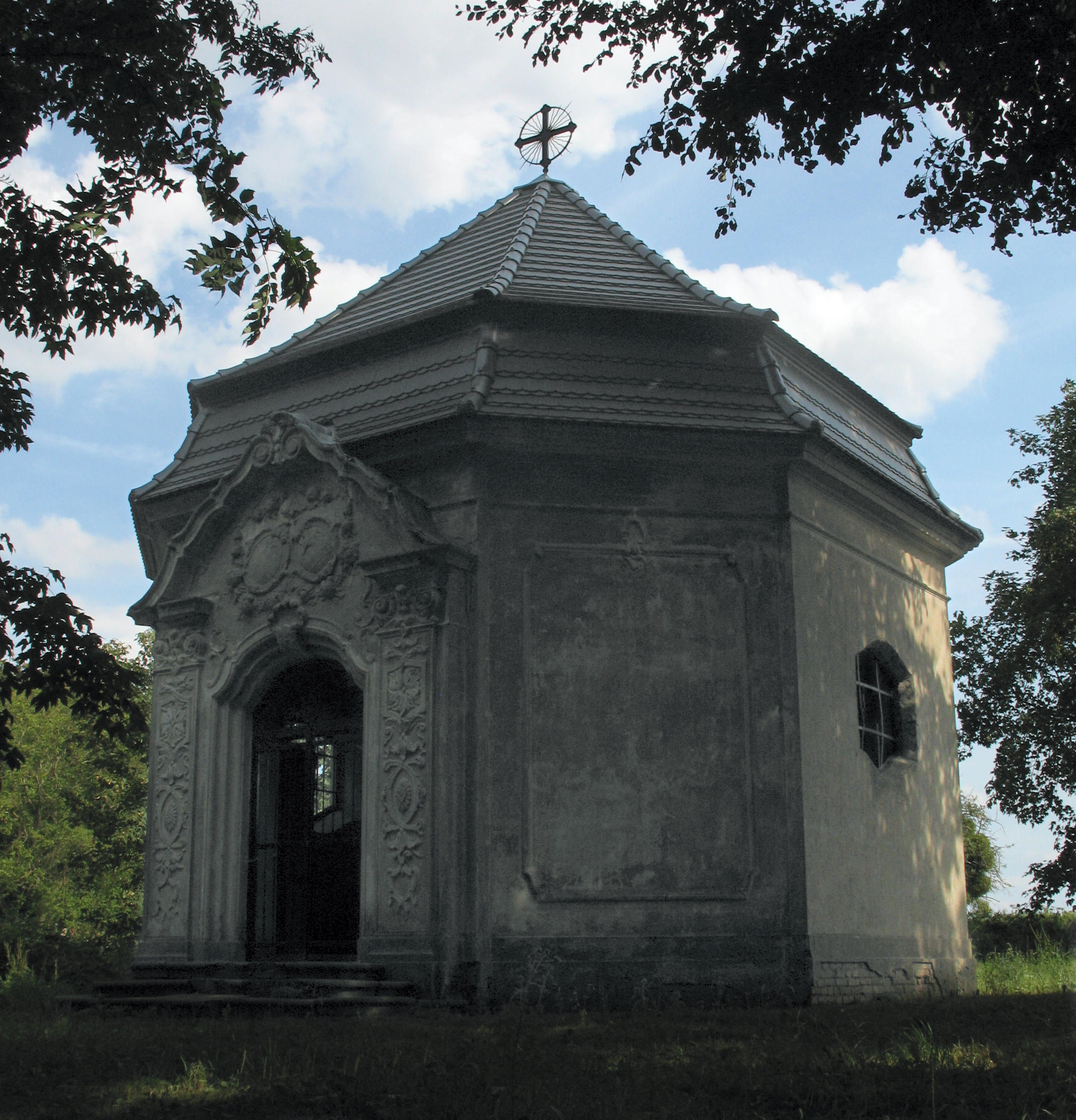
Chapel in the schloss park of Vollrathsruhe

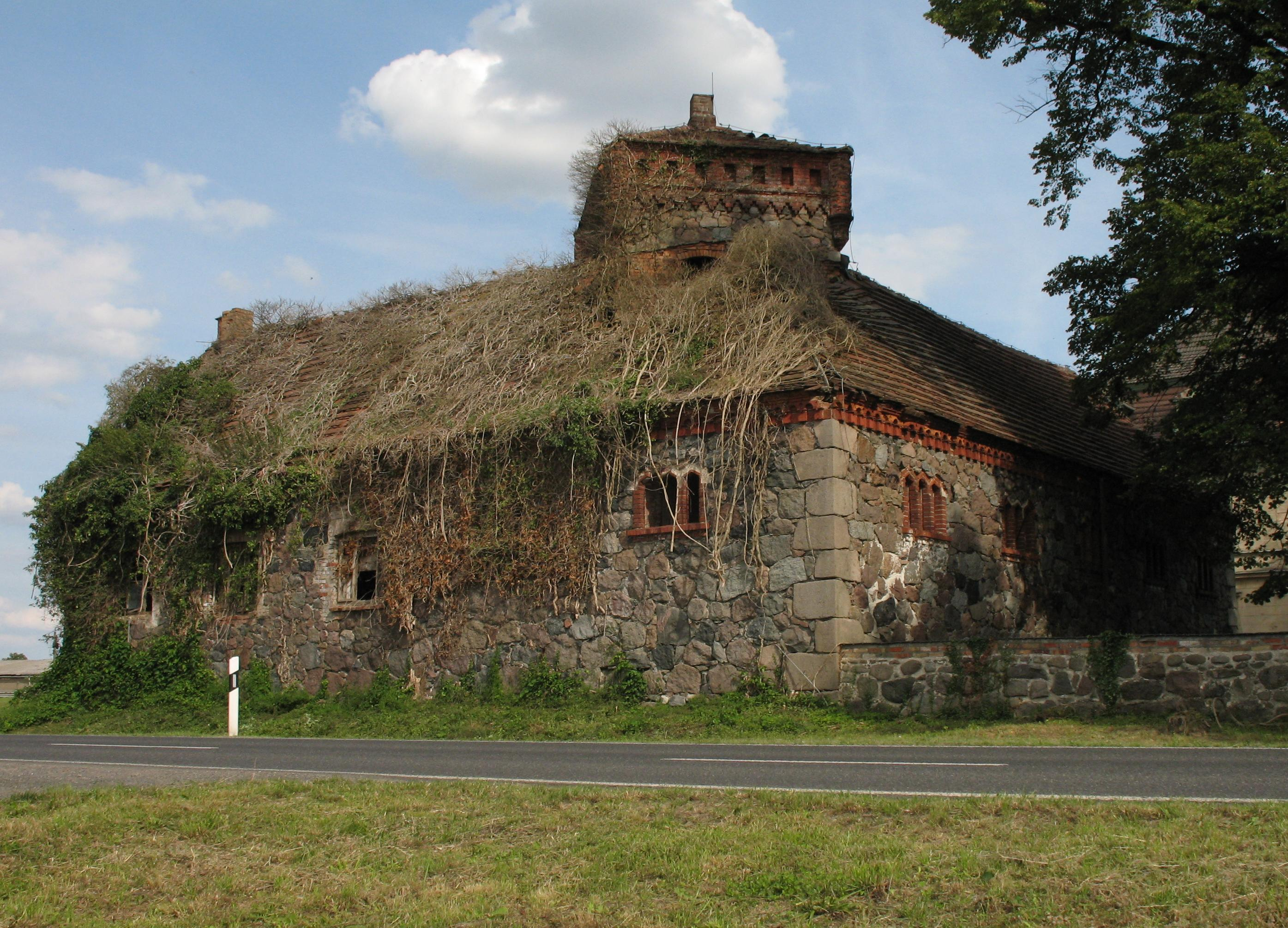
Fieldstone building in Vollrathsruhe

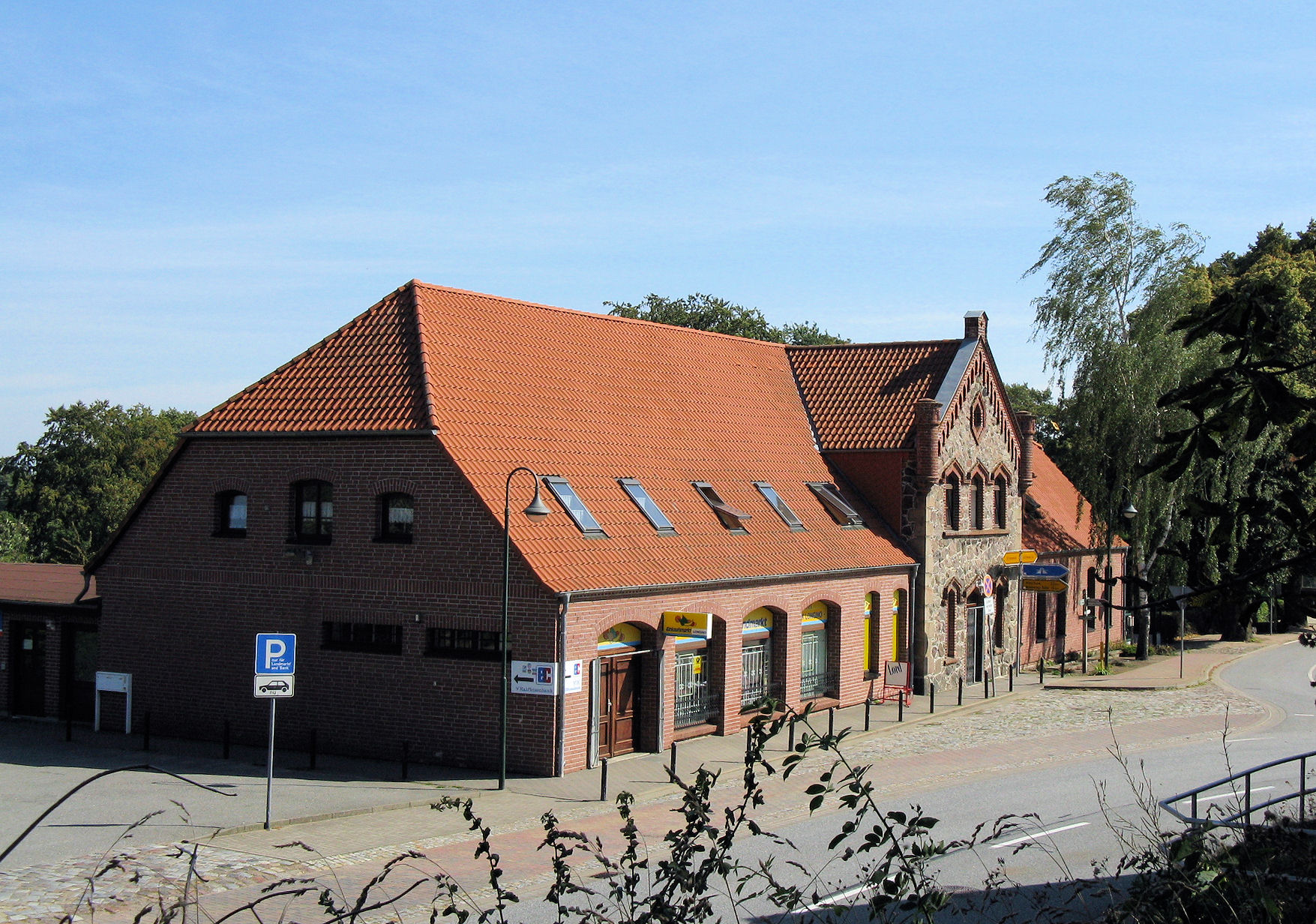
Building in Kirch Grubenhagen, Teterower Str. 3

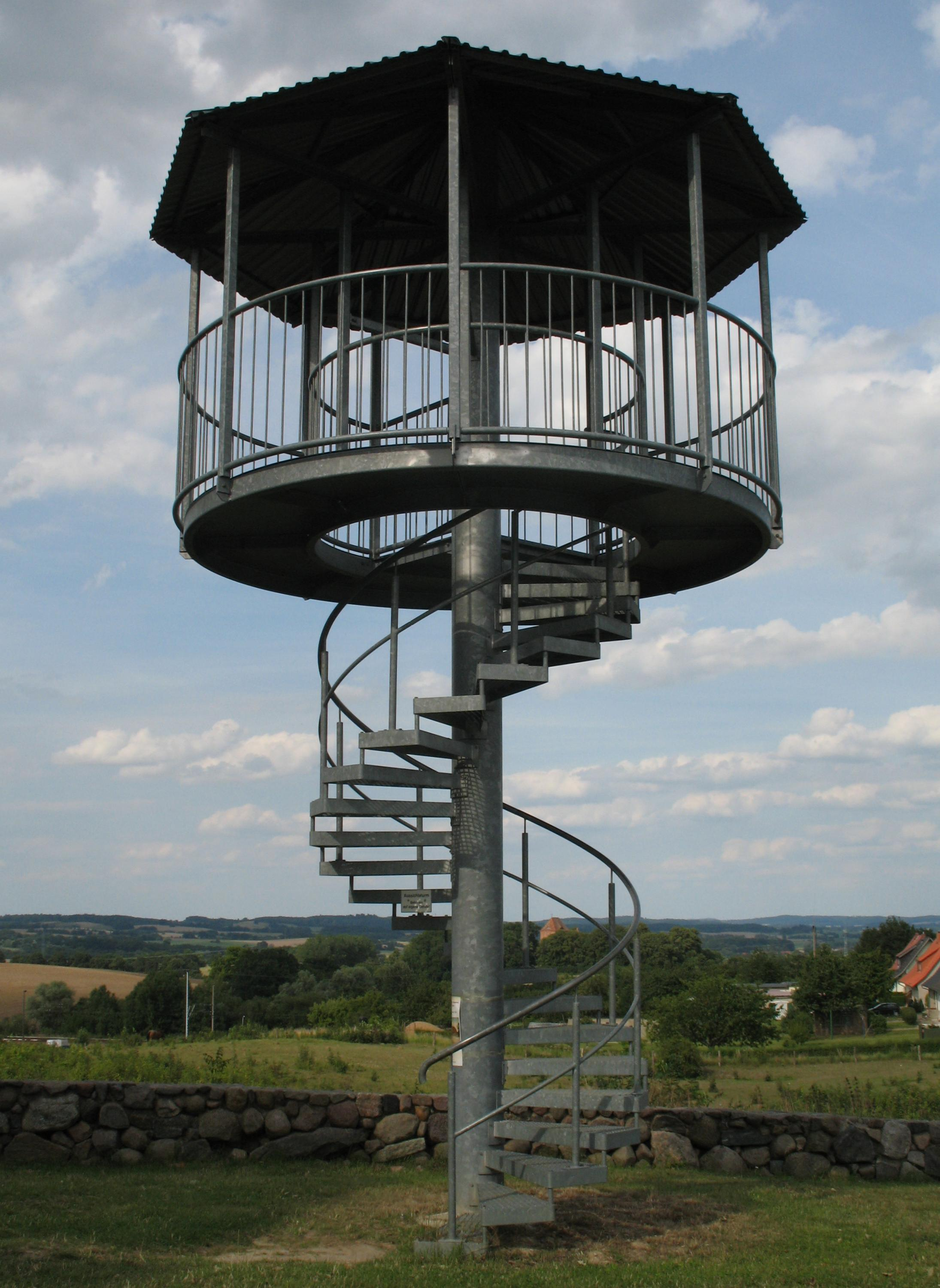
Viewing tower

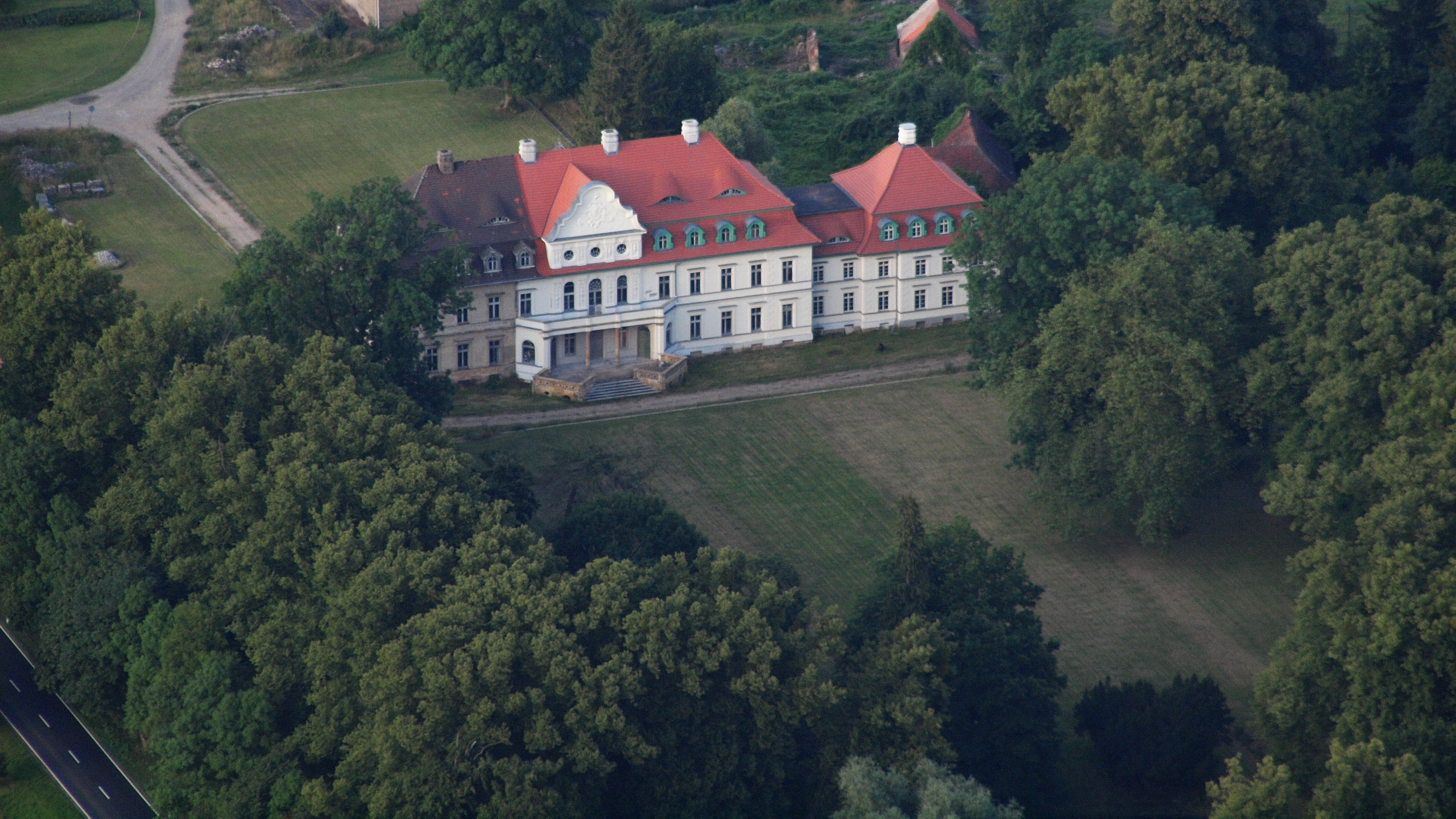
2014 aerial photograph of the castle
