= Kargow =

- Municipality
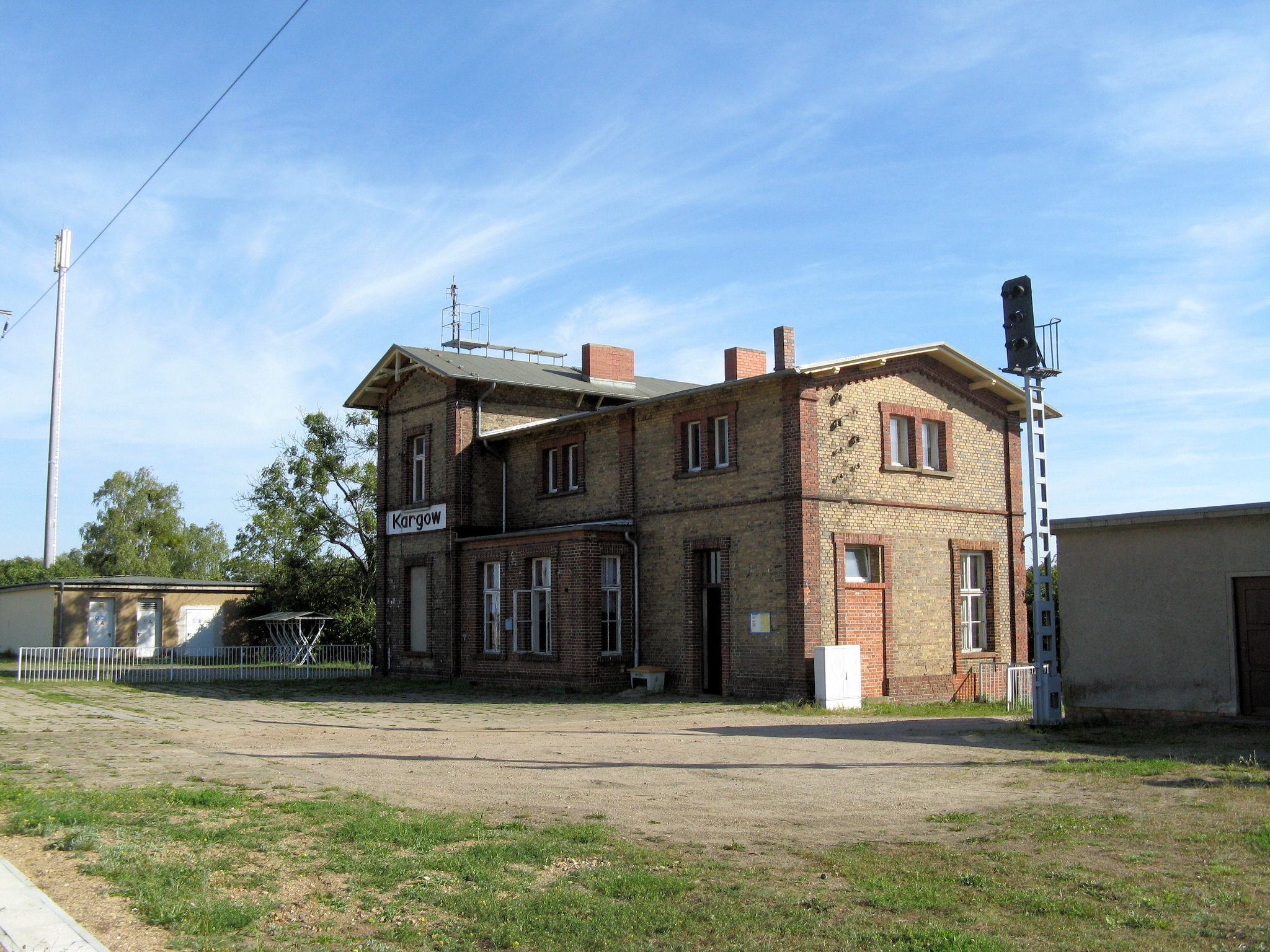
- Train station in Kargow

- Coat of arms

- Location of Kargow within Mecklenburgische Seenplatte district
- Interactive map of Kargow
- Location within Germany Location within Mecklenburg-Vorpommern
- Coordinates: 53°30′35″N 12°46′47″E
- Country: Germany
- State: Mecklenburg-Vorpommern
- District: Mecklenburgische Seenplatte
- Municipal assoc.: Seenlandschaft Waren

Government
  - Mayor: Manfred Schlüter

Area
  - Total: 69.08 km^{2} (26.67 sq mi)
- Elevation: 68 m (223 ft)

Population (2025-12-31)
  - Total: 615
  - Density: 8.90/km^{2} (23.1/sq mi)
- Time zone: UTC+01:00 (CET)
  - Summer (DST): UTC+02:00 (CEST)
- Postal codes: 17192
- Dialling codes: 03991
- Vehicle registration: MÜR
- Website: www.amt-slw.de

Kargow is a municipality in the Mecklenburgische Seenplatte district, in Mecklenburg-Vorpommern, in north-eastern Germany.

== History ==
During the final stages of World War II, on 20–24 February 1945, Federow (now part of the municipality) was the site of a stopover during the German-organised march of some 2,700 French prisoners of war from the Oflag II-B camp headed westwards, and on 28 February 1945, Kargow was the site of a stopover during the German-organised march of Polish prisoners of war from the Oflag II-D camp to the Stalag X-B camp.
