= Grubenhagen Castle (Vollrathsruhe) =

- Burg Grubenhagen
- Vollrathsruhe-Schloß Grubenhagen
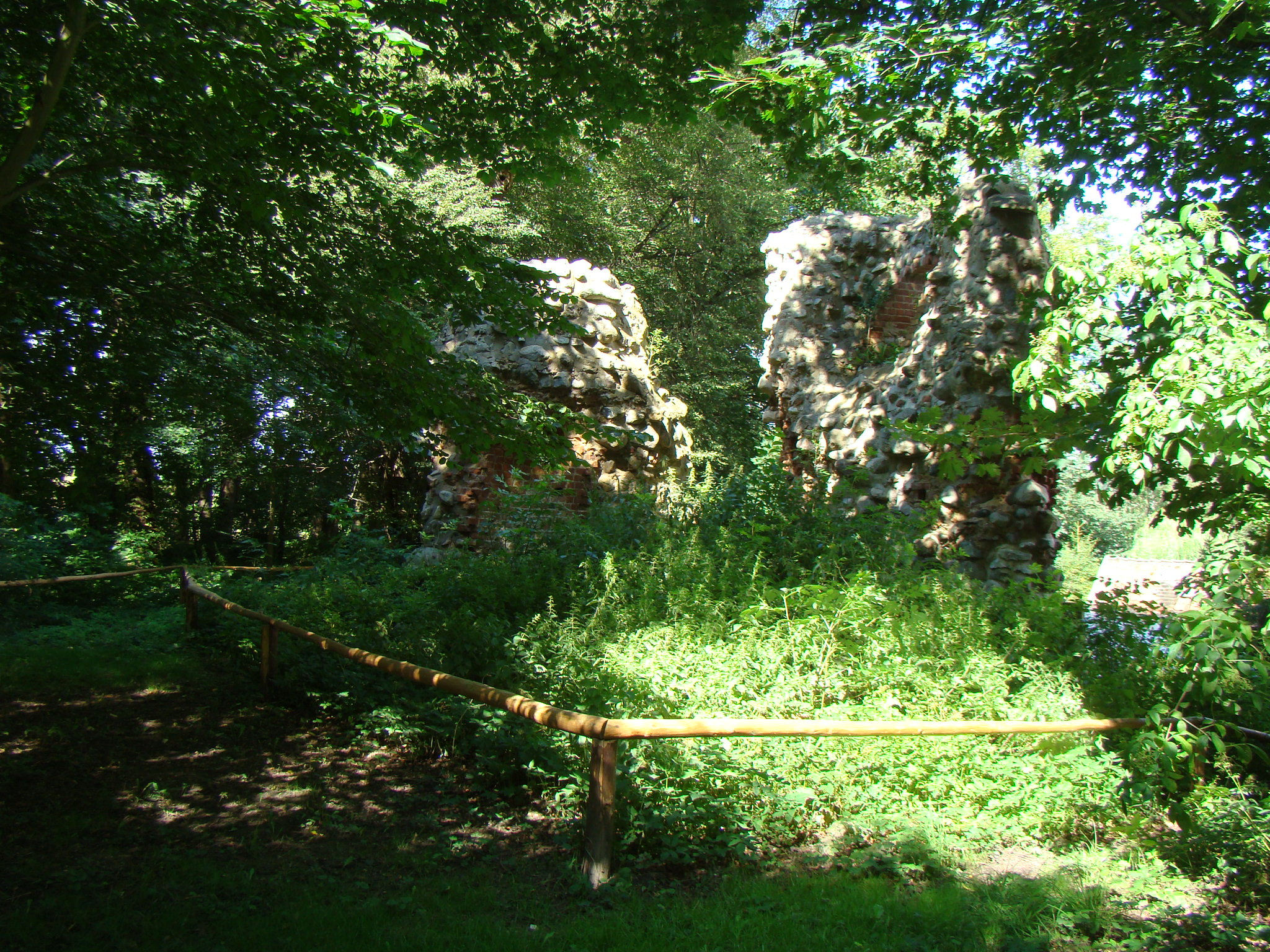
- Wall remains of the bergfried

Site information
- Type: Lowland castle and settlement
- Code: DE-MV
- Condition: wall remains, moat

Location
- Coordinates: 53°39′47″N 12°29′01″E
- Height: Height missing, see template documentation

Site history
- Built: 13th century
- Materials: Fieldstone, brick

Garrison information
- Occupants: nobility

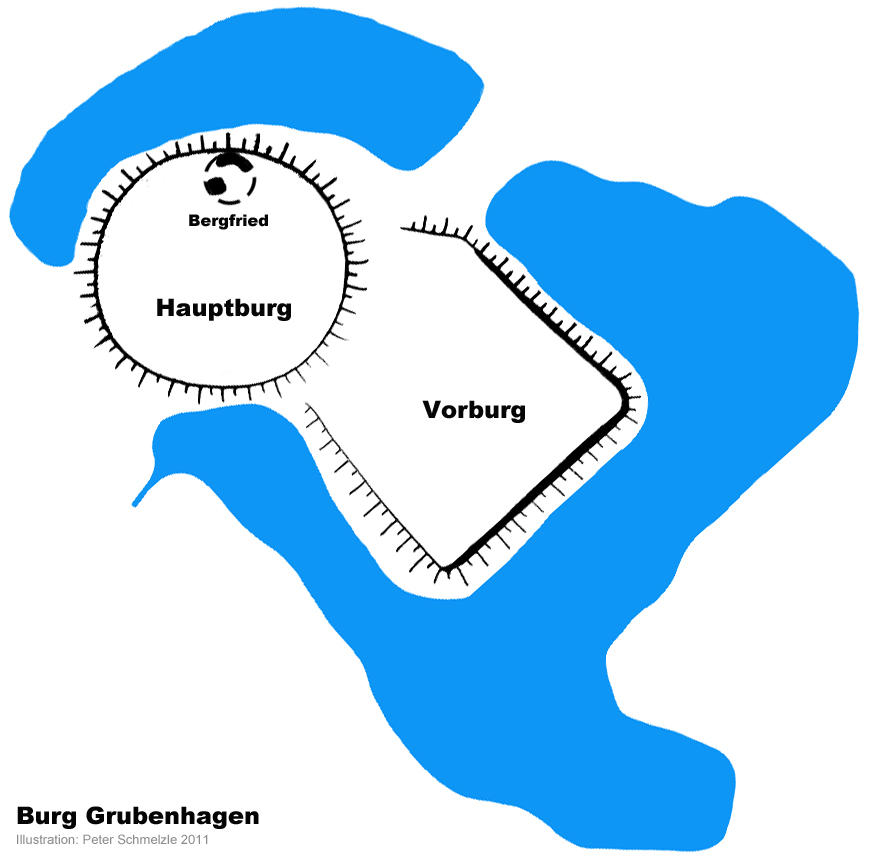
Plan of the site

Grubenhagen Castle (German: Burg Grubenhagen) is the ruin of a lowland castle in Schloß Grubenhagen, a village in the civil parish of Vollrathsruhe in the county of Mecklenburgische Seenplatte in Mecklenburg-Western Pomerania in Germany.

Only a few structural remains of the castle have survived, mainly comprising the 10-metre-high wall remains of the erstwhile bergfried with a wall thickness of 3.3 metres and made of fieldstone and brick. The rest of the site can largely be deduced on the spot above its geological base. To the northwest was the circular inner ward which had a somewhat lower, roughly rectangular outer ward to the southeast. The whole site was surrounded by a wide, water-filled moat which has survived in places.

The castle was built in the 13th century by the von Grube family and extended until the 15th century. The later lords of the castle were the von Maltzan family, who built an estate north of the castle, which the castle, now a manor house, sold off in the 19th century.

== Literature ==
- Die Bau- und Kunstdenkmale in der DDR, Bezirk Neubrandenburg, Berlin, 1986, p. 471.
