= Malchow (disambiguation) =

Malchow is a town in Mecklenburg-Vorpommern, Germany.

Malchow may also refer to:

== People with the surname ==
- Malchow (surname)

== Places ==
- Malchow (Amt), a collective municipality of Mecklenburg-Vorpommern, Germany
- Malchow (Berlin), a locality in the borough of Lichtenberg, Berlin
- Stadtrandsiedlung Malchow, a locality in the borough of Pankow, Berlin
- Lake Malchow
