= Malchow Abbey =

Coordinates: 53°28′17″N 12°25′53″E

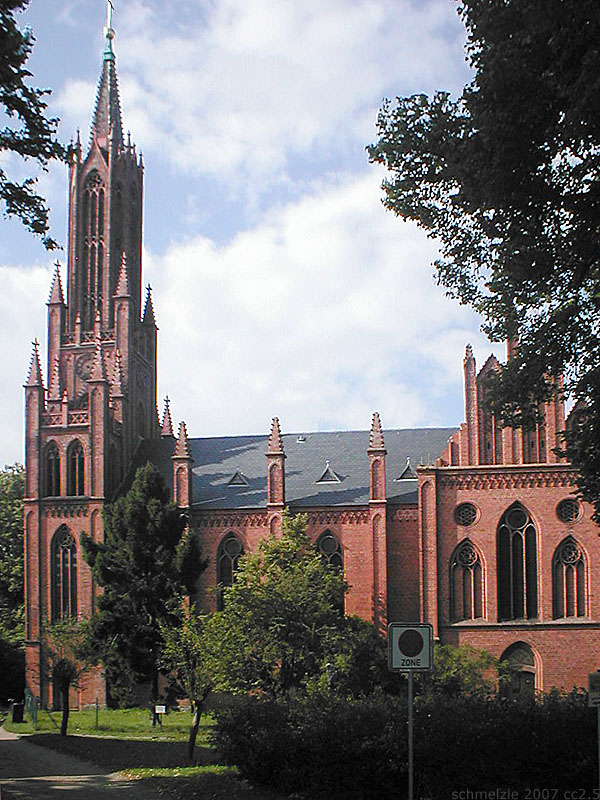
Malchow Abbey church

Malchow Abbey (Kloster Malchow) is a former Cistercian nunnery in Malchow in the district of Mecklenburgische Seenplatte in Mecklenburg-Vorpommern, Germany. The monastic buildings are on the east shore of Lake Malchow and now accommodate the Mecklenburgisches Orgelmuseum.

== History ==
In 1298 the Cistercian nunnery formerly situated at Röbel settled in Alt-Malchow and took over the premises of the former Magdalene community here. Nicholas II, Prince of Werle, gave the new nunnery the patronage of the churches at Alt-Malchow, Neu-Malchow and Lexow (in Walow). After the Reformation the abbey was a collegiate foundation for noblewomen (Damenstift) from 1572 to 1923.

== Buildings ==
The former abbey building complex is now dominated by the church, which was built between 1844 and 1849 to plans by Friedrich Wilhelm Buttel. These included a 52-metre high brick tower, after the addition of which it was thought necessary to refurbish the nave for aesthetic reasons. Before 1844 the church was a simple stone building.

After a fire in 1888 the church was rebuilt in a Gothic Revival between 1888 and 1890 according to plans by Georg Daniel.

Of the old abbey buildings there still exist the cloister, as well as some ancillary buildings now used for residential purposes.

== Mecklenburgisches Orgelmuseum ==
In the abbey church and the nearby organ courtyard is a permanent exhibition relating to the history of organ-building in Mecklenburg. The Mecklenburg Organ Museum (Mecklenburgisches Orgelmuseum) is the first of its sort in the new Bundesländer. In the abbey church itself there is an organ by Friedrich Friese III.

== Garden ==
The abbey complex also includes the Engelsche Garten, laid out by, and named after, Johann Jacob Christian Engel (1762–1840), master of the abbey kitchen from 1786 to 1818. It was not completed until 1855/56.

== See also ==
- List of music museums

== Sources ==
- Mecklenburgisches Orgelmuseum in Kloster Malchow (in German)
