= Bollewick =

- Municipality
- Location of Bollewick within Mecklenburgische Seenplatte district
- Interactive map of Bollewick
- Location within Germany Location within Mecklenburg-Vorpommern
- Coordinates: 53°21′N 12°35′E
- Country: Germany
- State: Mecklenburg-Vorpommern
- District: Mecklenburgische Seenplatte
- Municipal assoc.: Röbel-Müritz

Government
  - Mayor: Bertold Meyer

Area
  - Total: 26.69 km^{2} (10.31 sq mi)
- Elevation: 86 m (282 ft)

Population (2025-12-31)
  - Total: 617
  - Density: 23.1/km^{2} (59.9/sq mi)
- Time zone: UTC+01:00 (CET)
  - Summer (DST): UTC+02:00 (CEST)
- Postal codes: 17207
- Dialling codes: 039931
- Vehicle registration: MBS, MÜR
- Website: www.amt-roebel-mueritz.de

Bollewick is a municipality in the Mecklenburgische Seenplatte district, in Mecklenburg-Vorpommern, Germany. It is administered by the Röbel-Müritz office in the city of Röbel / Müritz. The municipality Bollewick includes the villages Nätebow, Spitzkuhn and since 7 June 2009, Kambs and Wildkuhl.

== History ==
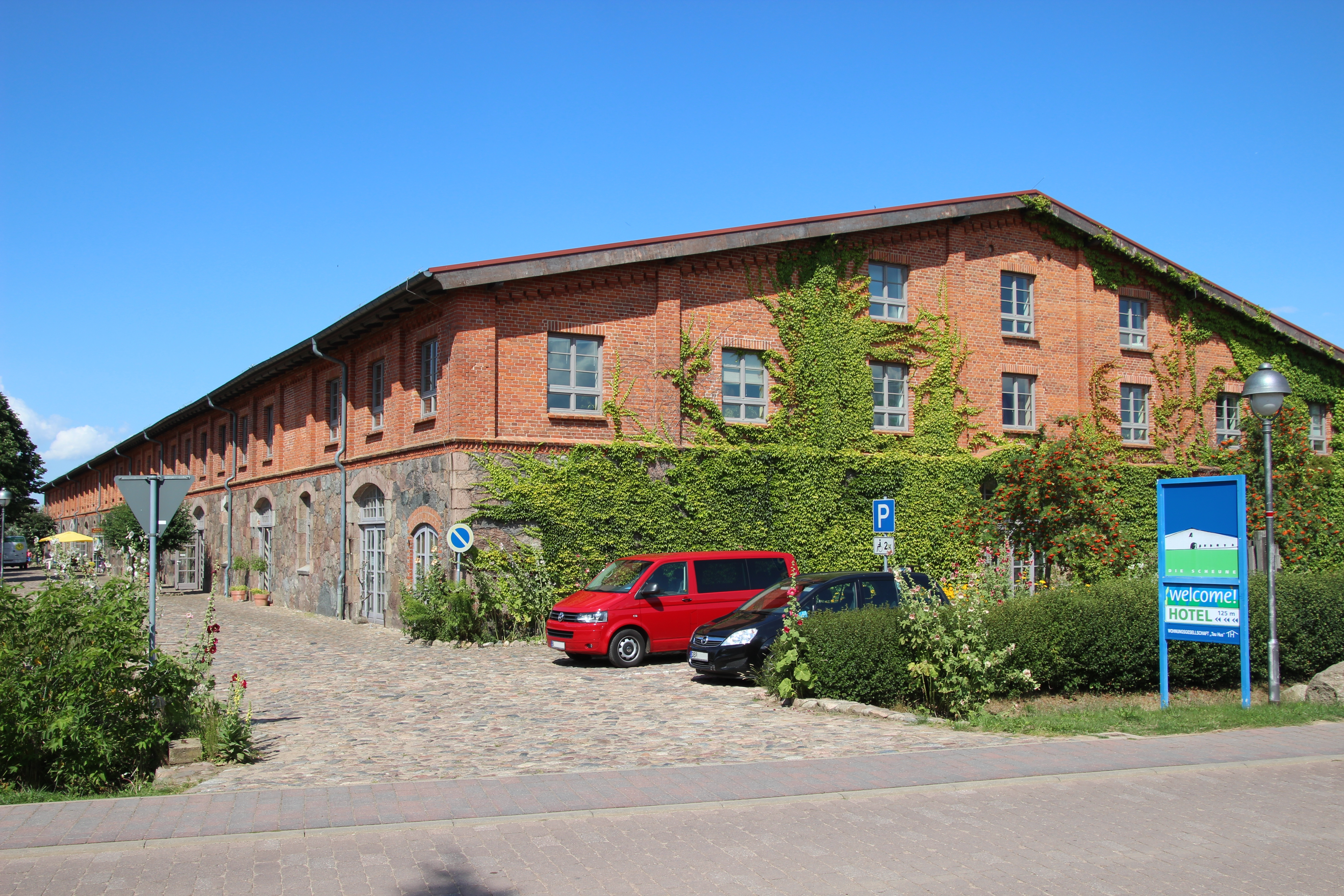
The Bollewick barn was built in 1881. It is considered the biggest stone and brick barn in Germany. It was converted into hotel and event center in 1991.

The name Bollewick with its components (round, bellied) and wick (German suffix wig, wik = place or village, borrowed from Latin vicus = village) means Runddorf.

From the early settlement of the area remained two megalithic tombs near the village. Bollewick was built as part of Nedebuh ( now Nätebow ) in the 13th century by the knight of Werle Konrad Büne. The first mention dates from January 21, 1261. The village was then about 1200 meters further west on the almost circular Wackstower lake.

The original site was abandoned probably due to the high groundwater level at the lake shore. Already at the beginning of the Thirty Years' War, the village stood desolate. Bollewick was built as a long-stretched linear settlement from the 18th century on the present site. After frequent change of ownership and gradual reconstruction, the community was increasingly resettled in the early 1930s.

== Attractions ==
- The Bollewick barn was built in 1881 and is a landmark of the municipality. It is the largest fieldstone barn in Germany, with a 125 m × 34 m area under the roof. Until 1991 barn was used for agriculture and since was renovated and converted into an event center with hotel and rows of shops.
- The early Gothic, cross-ribbed vaulted brick church in Nätebow. It was fortified village church in the 14th century but since was rebuilt several times. Interior is decorated with carved altar from 1522, and a statue of historical patron saint of the 17th century. The church is open to the public and to worship from time to time.
- The Gothic village church in Kambs dates back to the 13th century. It has fieldstone vault ceiling. The nave in western tower and the porch are from the 14th century.
- Since 2006 there is a maze in Bollewick.
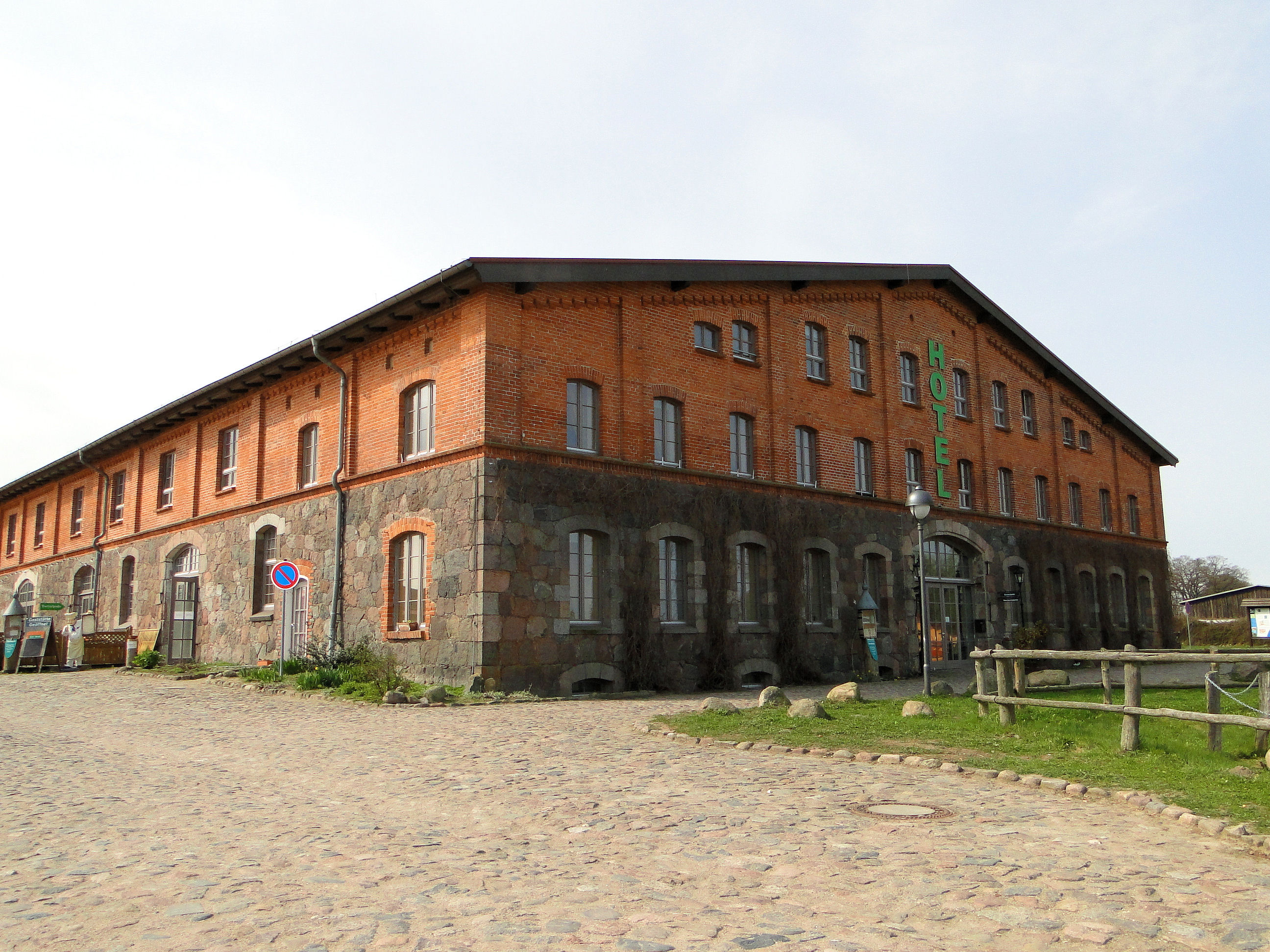
Barn in Bollewick.

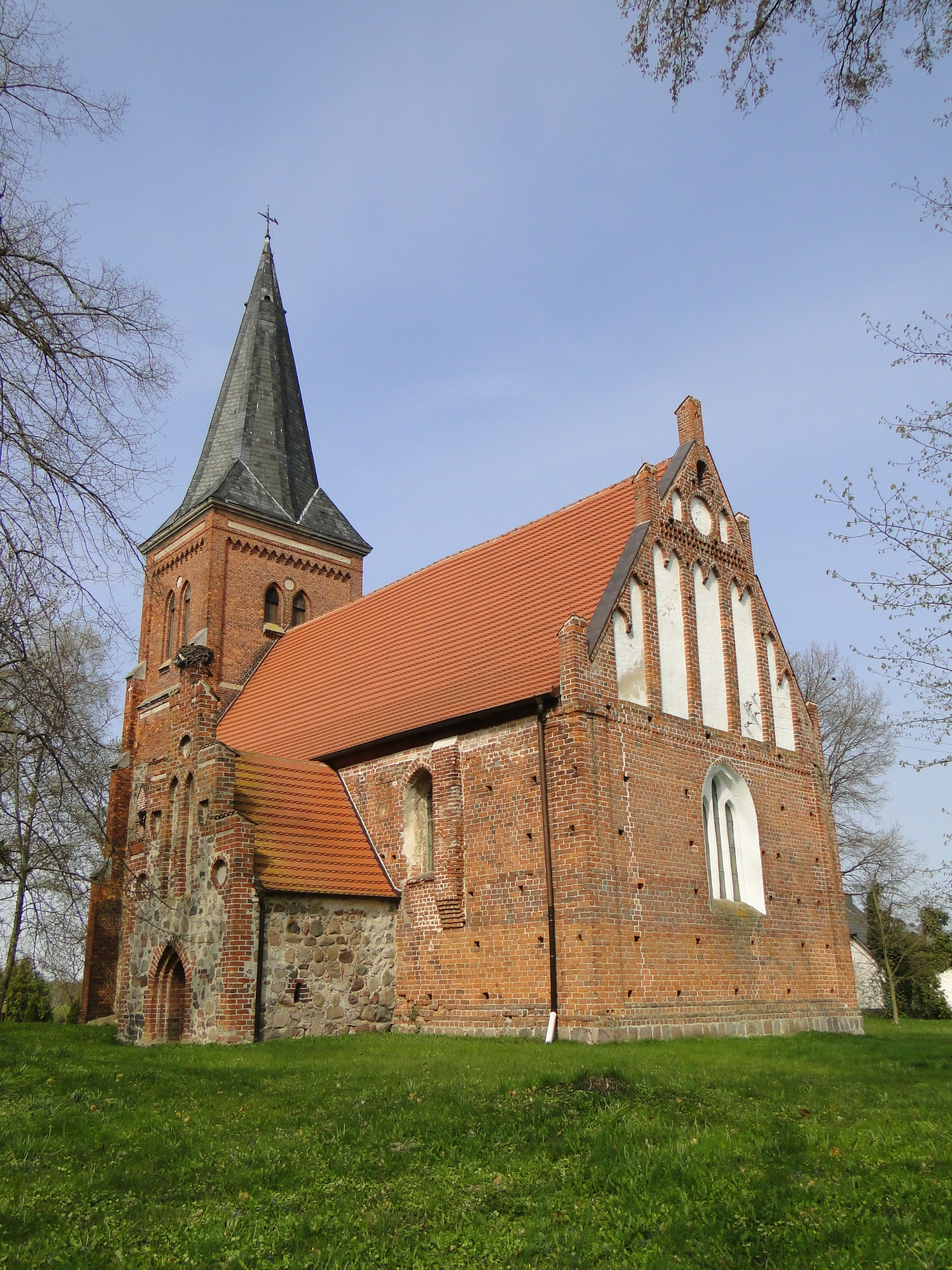
Village church in Nätebow.

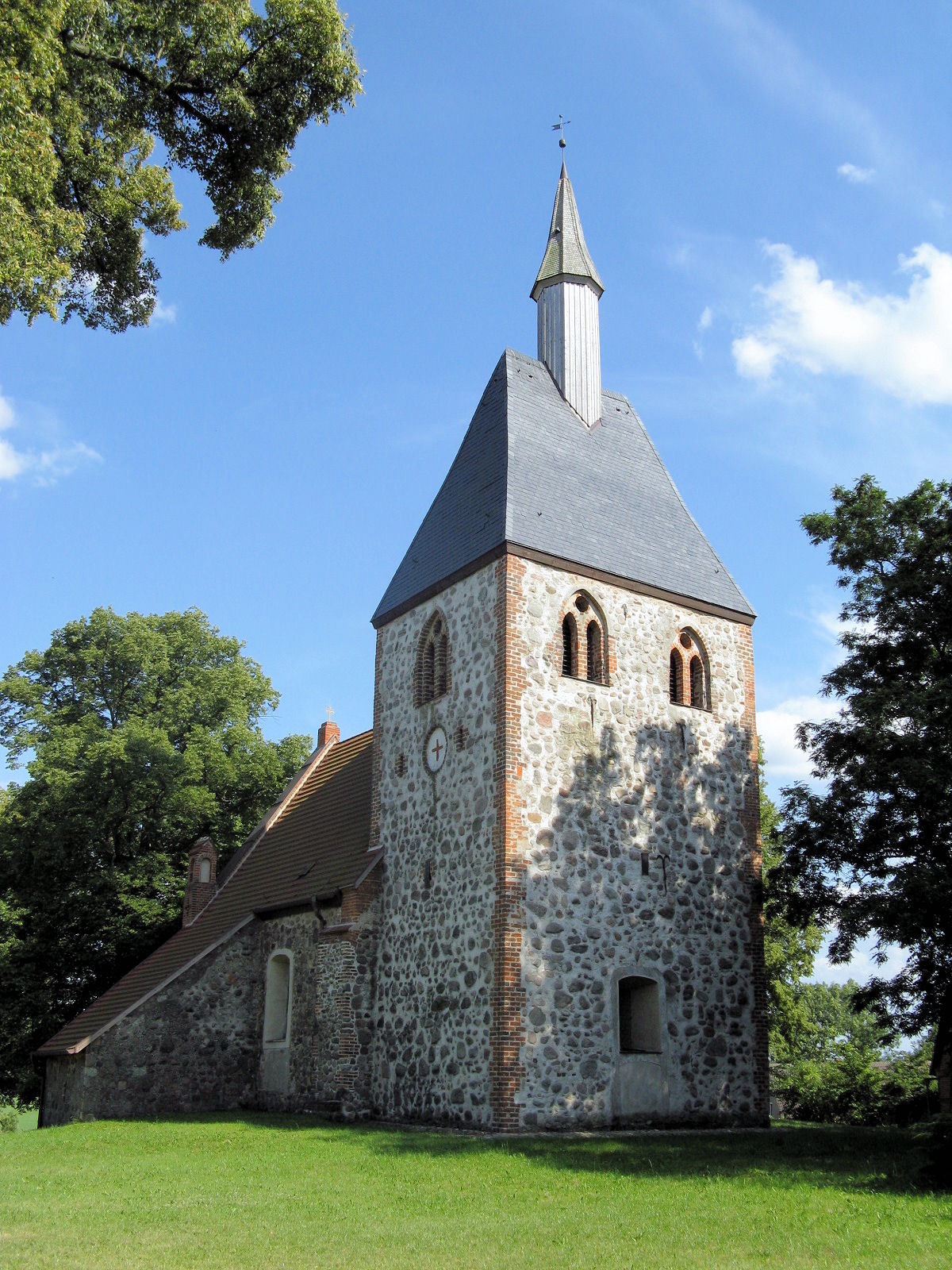
Gothic fortified church in Kambs.

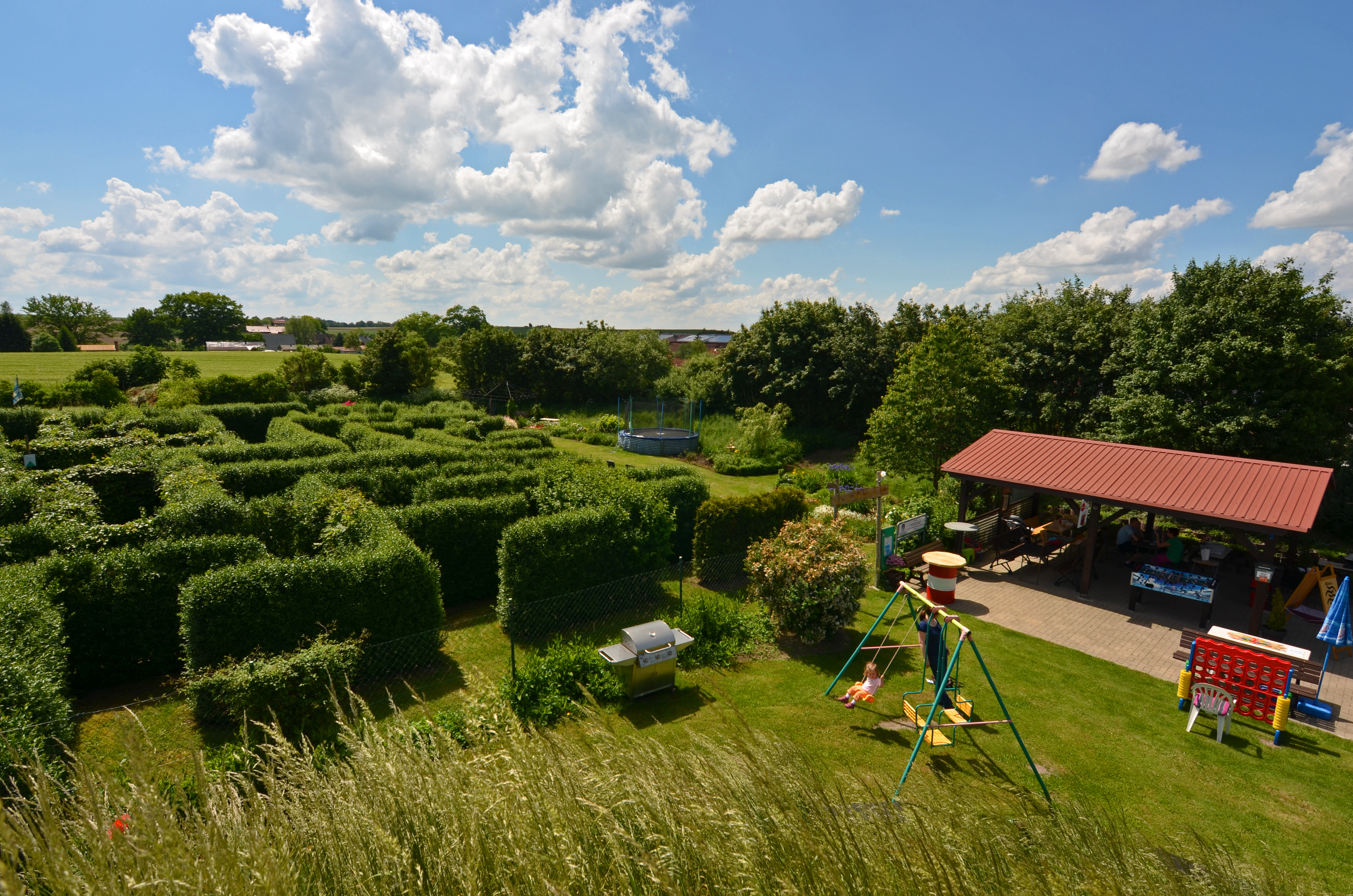
Maze in Bollewick.

== Transport ==
Bollewick is located on Bundesstrasse 198 – road from Röbel / Müritz. The motorway junction Röbel of Bundesautobahn 19 (Berlin–Rostock) is about eight kilometers away from Bollewick. The nearest railway stations are in Malchow and Waren (Müritz).

== See also ==
- Megaliths in Mecklenburg-Vorpommern
