= Lake Petersdorf =

Lake in the Mecklenburg Lake District, Germany

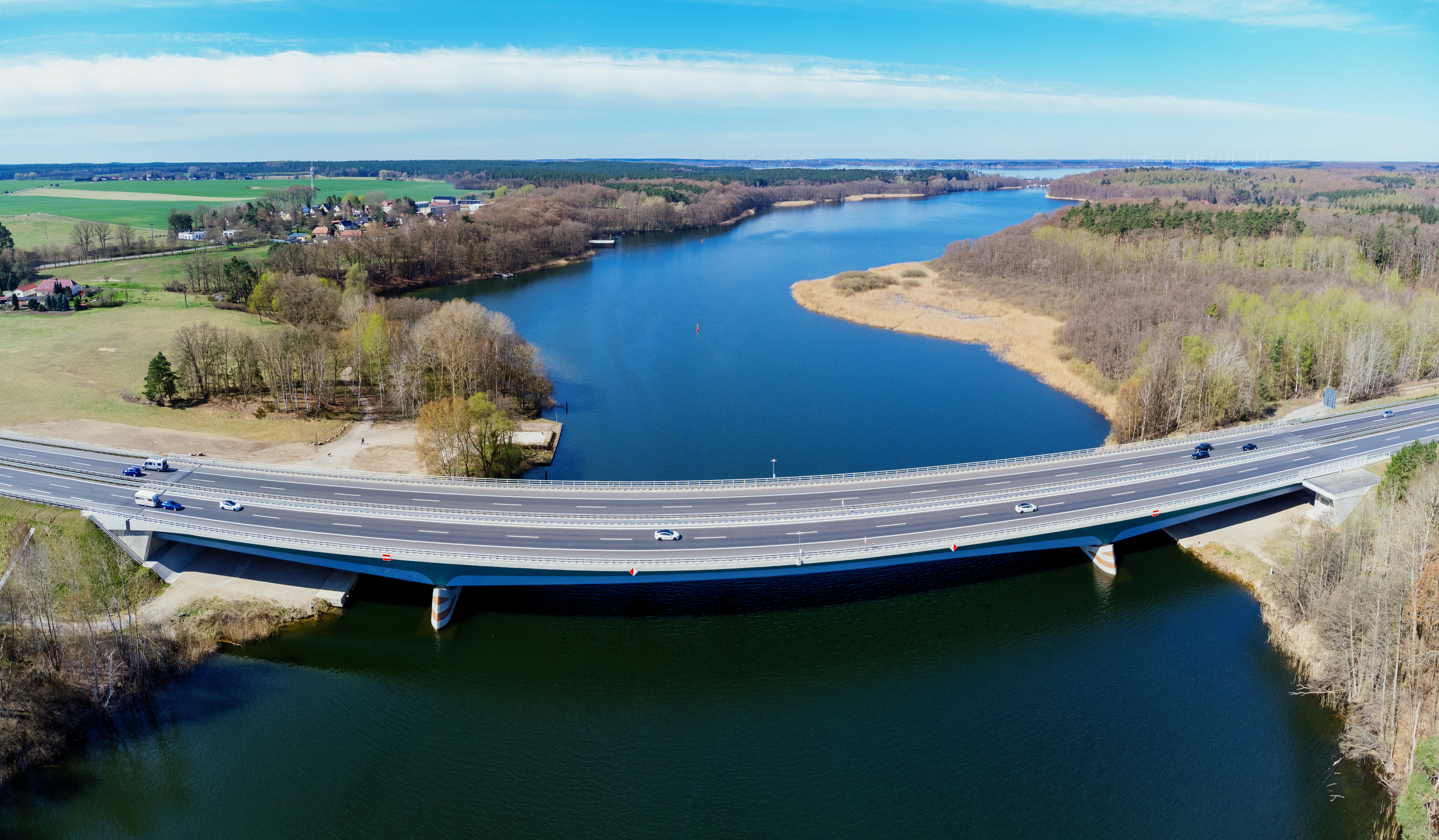
- Motorway bridge over Lake Petersdorf

- Location within Mecklenburg-Vorpommern
- Coordinates: 53.46165°N 12.37683°E
- Primary inflows: Recken (Elde) from Malchower See, ditches
- Primary outflows: Lenzkanal (Elde) to Plauer See
- Basin countries: Germany
- Surface area: 0.93 km^{2} (0.36 sq mi)
- Surface elevation: 62 metres (203 ft)
- Settlements: Lenz, Biestorf, Petersdorf, Lenz-Süd
- Bundesautobahn 19 crosses the lake

The Lake Petersdorf is an elongated lake within the Mecklenburg Lake District in the Mecklenburgische Seenplatte district, Mecklenburg-Vorpommern, Germany. It forms part of a chain of lakes stretching from the Müritz to the Plauer See.

== Location ==
The lake is located within the municipalities of Fünfseen and the town of Malchow. The northern shore includes the Malchow localities of Lenz-Nord and Biestorf, while the southern shore encompasses the Fünfseen localities of Petersdorf and Lenz-Süd. The lake is fed by the Recken, a section of the Elde river, which flows from the Malchower See. Its outflow to the west occurs via the Lenzkanal (Elde) into the Plauer See. The Lake Petersdorf covers an area of 1 km², with a length of 2.2 kilometers and a maximum width of 670 meters. The water level is at 62,0 meters.

The lake is part of the Federal Waterway Müritz-Elde-Wasserstraße, classified as Class I, under the jurisdiction of the Lauenburg Waterways and Shipping Office.

The lake is crossed by a bridge of the Bundesautobahn 19.

== History ==
The lake’s water level has been altered multiple times over the centuries, primarily due to human interventions. In the 12th century, the water level was approximately 60 meters above sea level. Water levels across the lake chain from the Müritz to the Plauer See were influenced by mill operations and river regulations, resulting in both increases and decreases. Today, only the Plau am See weir at the outflow of the Plauer See regulates the water level of the lake chain, with a target range of 61.61 to 62.36 meters above NHN.

== See also ==
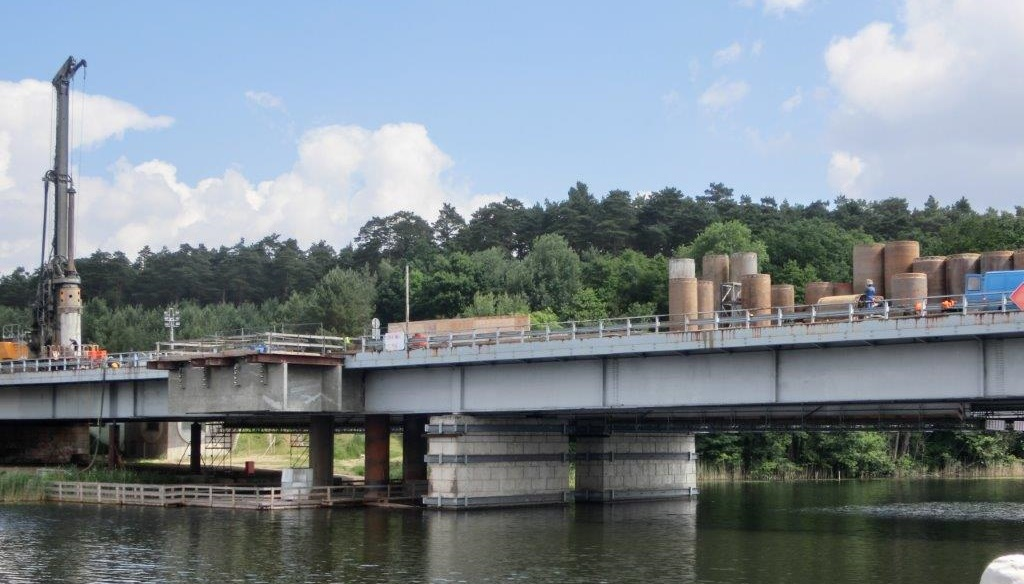
Bridge renovation A 19 (2016)

- List of lakes of Mecklenburg-Vorpommern
