= Marie Henning =

German activist and politician (1895–1948)

- Born: Marie Caroline Henriette Mahnke; 26 December 1895; Nossentiner Hütte, Westphalia, Germany
- Died: 5 January 1948 (aged 52); Hamburg, British occupation zone (Germany)
- Occupation: politician
- Political party: KPD
- Spouse(s): 1. Ernst Henning (1892-1931); 2. Carl Rohde (?-1944)
- Children: 3

Marie Henning (born Maria Mahnke: 26 December 1895 - 5 January 1948) was a German activist and politician (KPD). After her husband was murdered in 1931 the party nominated her to seek election to the Hamburg Parliament ("Hamburgische Bürgerschaft") in his place. She was successful, and sat as a member of the Hamburg Parliament from September 1931 until democratic institutions were withdrawn during the early summer of 1933.

== Life ==
Marie Caroline Henriette Mahnke was born at Nossentiner Hütte, a small village in the marshy flatlands between Rostock and Berlin. By 1920 she was living in Hamburg and had been married, since 1913, to Ernst Henning. They were both activist members of the recently launched Communist Party. She was a member of the Women's Policy department of the party district leadership ("Bezirksleitung") for the Wasserkant district (surrounding Hamburg to the north of the river. She also belonged to the Soviet sponsored Red Aid workers' welfare association. Meanwhile, her husband became a member of the Hamburg Parliament ("Hamburgische Bürgerschaft") in 1927/28. However, he was murdered by Nazi fanatics on 14 March 1931 while heading back from a political meeting to the city on a late night bus. The event resonated widely, with 35,000 demonstrators reportedly following his coffin to its final resting place at Hamburg's Ohlsdorf Cemetery. At the next election, which took place in September 1931, despite being the widowed mother of three small children, Marie Henning stood for election to the parliament in his place. She was elected.

Régime change in January 1933 was followed by a Nazi paramilitary invasion of parliament in March 1933, during the course of which communist members were arrested. Democratic processes were being systematically abolished and the final sitting of the parliament took place in June 1933. Marie Henning was arrested several times during the twelve Nazi years, although sources are vague as to times and places. She appears to have been arrested between May and June 1933 and again in March 1936. Her final arrest came in the context of "Aktion Gitter", a mass arrest of more than 5,000 people that took place overnight on 22/23 August, probably in response to an assassination attempt against the leader on 20 July 1944. Those arrested were identified on (in many cases out of date) lists of people who had been politically active members of (non-Nazi) political parties before 1933. Marie Henning was one of those who were released in September 1944 after just a few weeks in detention.

War ended in May 1945 along with the Nazi régime. Marie Henning lived on for another two and a half years during which she was an active member of the Committee of former political prisoners in Hamburg-Bergedorf ("Komitee ehemaliger politischer Gefangener in Hamburg-Bergedorf "). However, during these final years much of her time was spent in hospital, and she died of cancer in Hamburg on 5 January 1948.

== Family ==
Marie Henning was married twice: both her husbands predeceased her, and both died violent deaths. Her first marriage, to Ernst Henning, ended when her husband was murdered on a bus in 1931. This marriage produced one son and two daughters. The couple's son, Otto, was killed on the Russian front in August 1944.

Her second marriage was to Carl Rohde, a former leader of the pre-Nazi Black-Red-Gold anti-extremist organisation. He was conscripted into the army and died on 5 June 1944 at a munitions depot in Büchsenschinken when an anti-tank "Panzerfaust" gun exploded.

== Celebration ==
In 1995 a street was renamed the "Marie-Henning-Weg" in the Neuallermöhe (Bergedorf) quarter of Hamburg.
