= Silz =

Silz may refer to the following places:

- Silz, Austria, in Tyrol, Austria
- Silz, Mecklenburg-Vorpommern, in Mecklenburg-Vorpommern, Germany
- Silz, Rhineland-Palatinate, in Rhineland-Palatinate, Germany
