= Zislow =

- Municipality
- Location of Zislow within Mecklenburgische Seenplatte district
- Interactive map of Zislow
- Location within Germany Location within Mecklenburg-Vorpommern
- Coordinates: 53°26′N 12°19′E
- Country: Germany
- State: Mecklenburg-Vorpommern
- District: Mecklenburgische Seenplatte
- Municipal assoc.: Malchow

Government
  - Mayor: Daniel Kyek

Area
  - Total: 15.84 km^{2} (6.12 sq mi)
- Elevation: 81 m (266 ft)

Population (2025-12-31)
  - Total: 181
  - Density: 11.4/km^{2} (29.6/sq mi)
- Time zone: UTC+01:00 (CET)
  - Summer (DST): UTC+02:00 (CEST)
- Postal codes: 17209
- Dialling codes: 039924
- Vehicle registration: MÜR
- Website: www.gemeinde-zislow.de

Zislow is a municipality in the Mecklenburgische Seenplatte district, in Mecklenburg-Vorpommern, Germany.
