= Fünfseen =

- Municipality
- Location of Fünfseen within Mecklenburgische Seenplatte district
- Interactive map of Fünfseen
- Location within Germany Location within Mecklenburg-Vorpommern
- Coordinates: 53°25′00″N 12°22′59″E
- Country: Germany
- State: Mecklenburg-Vorpommern
- District: Mecklenburgische Seenplatte
- Municipal assoc.: Malchow

Government
  - Mayor: Egbert Wenghöfer

Area
  - Total: 51.82 km^{2} (20.01 sq mi)
- Elevation: 90 m (300 ft)

Population (2025-12-31)
  - Total: 978
  - Density: 18.9/km^{2} (48.9/sq mi)
- Time zone: UTC+01:00 (CET)
  - Summer (DST): UTC+02:00 (CEST)
- Postal codes: 17209, 17213
- Dialling codes: 039924, 039932
- Vehicle registration: MSE, AT, DM, MC, MST, MÜR, NZ, RM, WRN

Fünfseen is a municipality in the Mecklenburgische Seenplatte district, in Mecklenburg-Vorpommern, Germany. It is administered by the Amt Malchow based in the city of the same name.

Fünfseen was established by merging former independent communities Adamshoffnung, Grüssow, Kogel, Rogeez and Satow by 1 January 2005. Other neighborhoods are Bruchmühle, Lenz-Süd, Neu Grüssow, Petersdorf and Satow Hütte.
