= Alt Schwerin =

- Municipality
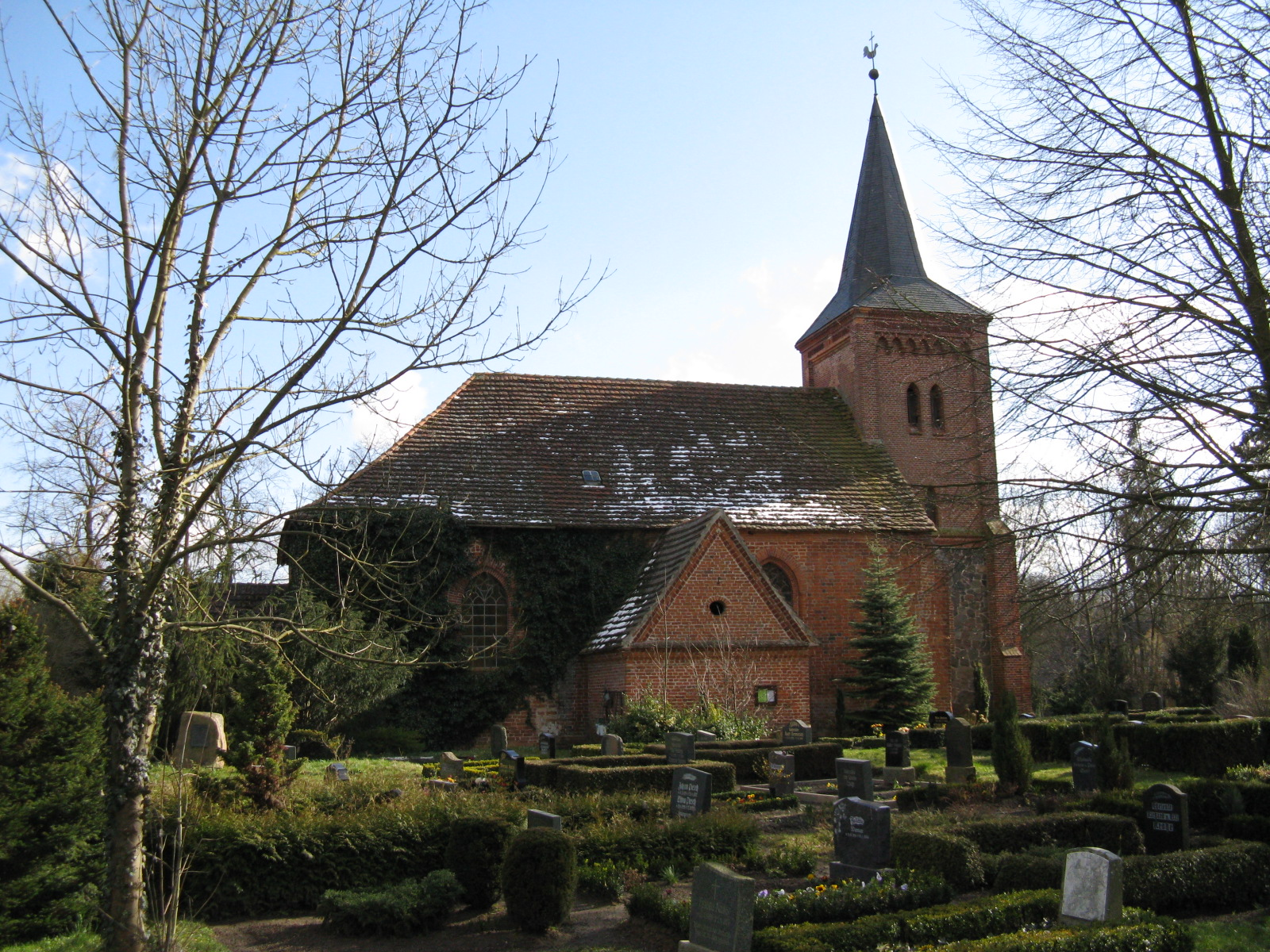
- Church in Alt Schwerin

- Coat of arms

- Location of Alt Schwerin within Mecklenburgische Seenplatte district
- Interactive map of Alt Schwerin
- Location within Germany Location within Mecklenburg-Vorpommern
- Coordinates: 53°30′47″N 12°21′24″E
- Country: Germany
- State: Mecklenburg-Vorpommern
- District: Mecklenburgische Seenplatte
- Municipal assoc.: Malchow

Government
  - Mayor: Wolfgang Holbe

Area
  - Total: 44.44 km^{2} (17.16 sq mi)
- Elevation: 84 m (276 ft)

Population (2025-12-31)
  - Total: 537
  - Density: 12.1/km^{2} (31.3/sq mi)
- Time zone: UTC+01:00 (CET)
  - Summer (DST): UTC+02:00 (CEST)
- Postal codes: 17214
- Dialling codes: 039932
- Vehicle registration: MÜR

Alt Schwerin (German pronunciation: [ˈalt ʃveˈʁiːn]) is a municipality in the Mecklenburgische Seenplatte district, in Mecklenburg-Vorpommern, Germany.

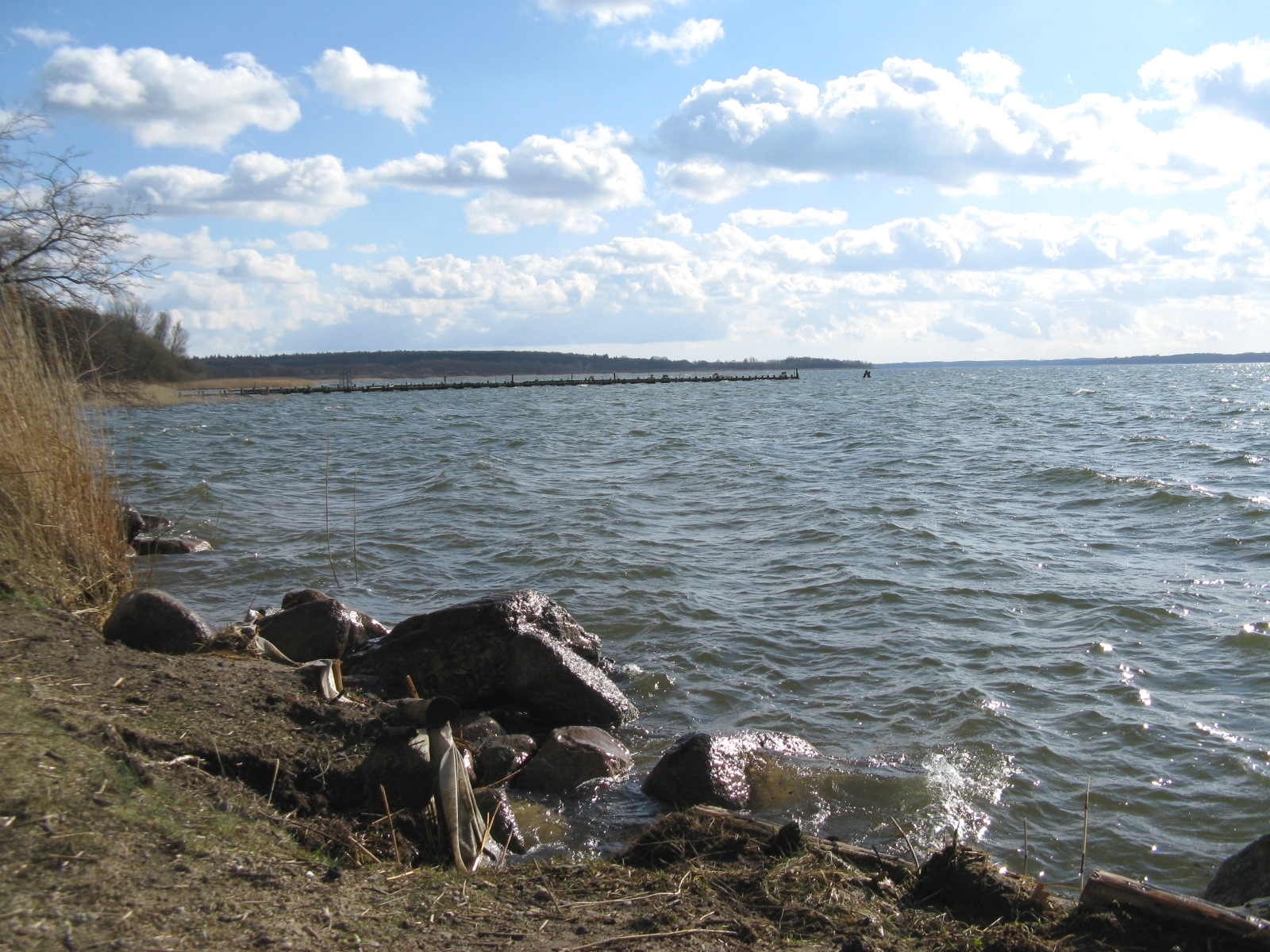
North shore of lake Plauer See
