= Kambs =

- Ortsteil of Bollewick
- Interactive map of Kambs
- Location within Germany Location within Mecklenburg-Vorpommern
- Coordinates: 53°19′N 12°34′E
- Country: Germany
- State: Mecklenburg-Vorpommern
- District: Mecklenburgische Seenplatte
- Town: Bollewick

Area
  - Total: 13.95 km^{2} (5.39 sq mi)
- Elevation: 70 m (230 ft)

Population (2006-12-31)
  - Total: 265
  - Density: 19.0/km^{2} (49.2/sq mi)
- Time zone: UTC+01:00 (CET)
  - Summer (DST): UTC+02:00 (CEST)
- Postal codes: 17207
- Dialling codes: 039925
- Vehicle registration: MÜR
- Website: www.amt-roebel- mueritz.de

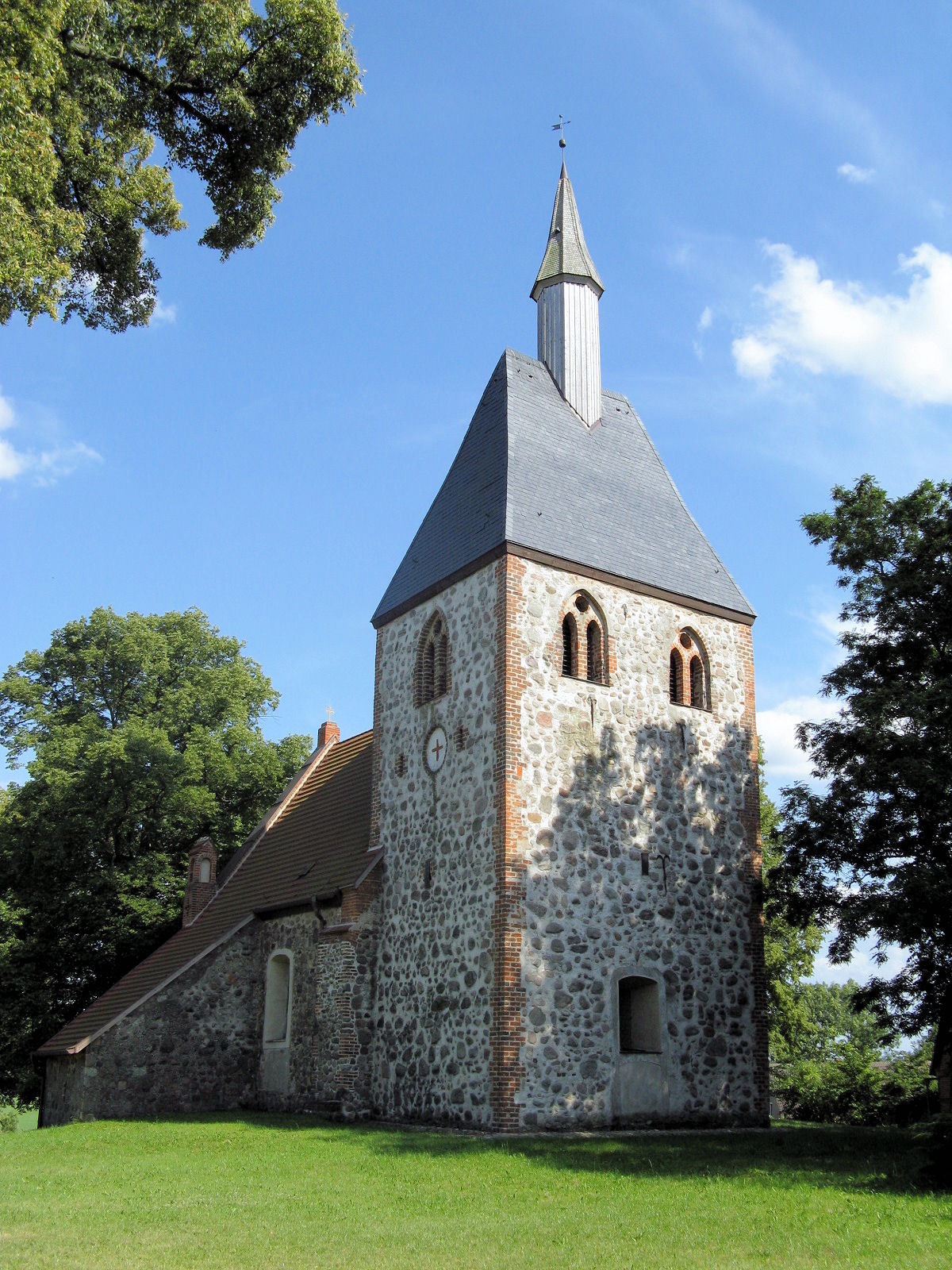
A church in Kambs

Kambs is a village and a former municipality in the Mecklenburgische Seenplatte district, in Mecklenburg-Vorpommern, Germany. Since 7 June 2009, it is part of the municipality Bollewick.
