= Wackstower See =

Lake in Germany

- Location within Mecklenburg-Vorpommern
- Location: Mecklenburgische Seenplatte, Mecklenburg-Vorpommern
- Coordinates: 53°21′31″N 12°33′38″E
- Basin countries: Germany
- Surface area: 0.036 km^{2} (0.014 sq mi)
- Surface elevation: 65.2 m (214 ft)

Wackstower See is a lake 1200 meters west of Bollewick on the border with Bütow in the Mecklenburgische Seenplatte district, in Mecklenburg-Vorpommern, Germany. The body of water has a size of 3.6 hectares and is located at 65.2 m above sea level (NHN). The diameter of the almost round lake is 200 meters. Tributaries are some ditches, one of them from Lake Karchower, a ditch drains into the Müritz. The shores are surrounded by a wide belt of marshland, which is adjoined by forest on all sides. The lake is named after the Wackstow desert, which is elevated above the water about 430 meters to the northwest. The disused Ganzlin–Röbel railway runs a short distance away.
