= Malchow (Amt) =

Collective municipality in Mecklenburg-Vorpommern, Germany

- Amt
- Map of Mecklenburgische Seenplatte highlighting Malchow
- Interactive map of Malchow
- Location within Germany Location within Mecklenburg-Vorpommern
- Coordinates: 53°28′N 12°25′E
- Country: Germany
- State: Mecklenburg-Vorpommern
- District: Mecklenburgische Seenplatte
- Seat: Malchow
- Subdivisions: 8 municipalities

Area
  - Total: 269.33 km^{2} (103.99 sq mi)

Population (2025-12-31)
  - Total: 10,272
  - Density: 38.139/km^{2} (98.780/sq mi)
- Time zone: UTC+01:00 (CET)
  - Summer (DST): UTC+02:00 (CEST)
- Website: www.amt-malchow.de

Malchow is an Amt in the Mecklenburgische Seenplatte district, in Mecklenburg-Vorpommern, Germany. The seat of the Amt is in Malchow. The Amt was established on 1 January 2005, following the administrative merger of the former Amt Malchow-Land and the formerly unincorporated island town of Malchow.

The Amt Malchow consists of the following municipalities:

1. Alt Schwerin
2. Fünfseen
3. Göhren-Lebbin
4. Malchow
5. Nossentiner Hütte
6. Silz
7. Walow
8. Zislow
