= Walow =

- Municipality
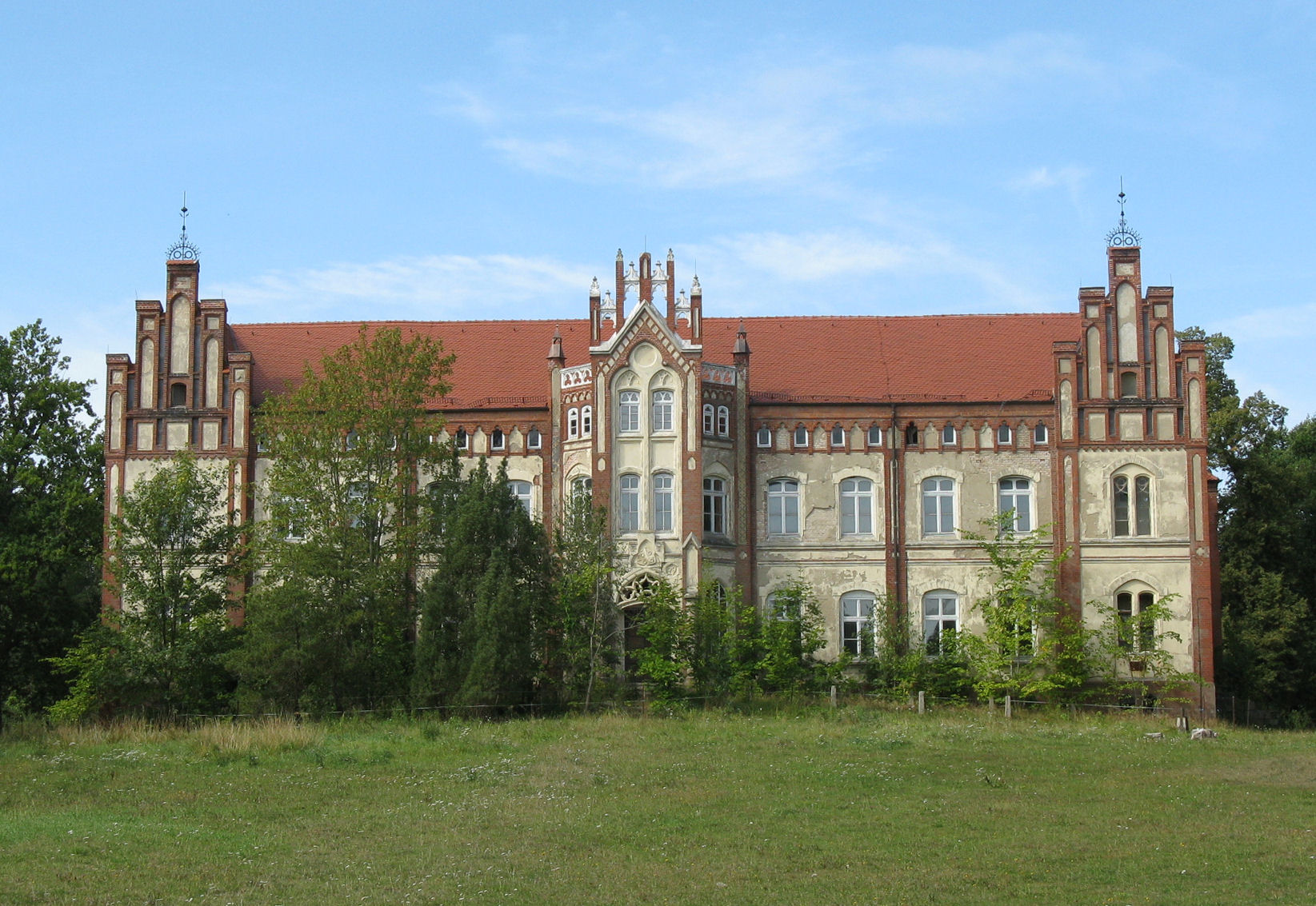
- Walow Manor

- Coat of arms

- Location of Walow within Mecklenburgische Seenplatte district
- Interactive map of Walow
- Location within Germany Location within Mecklenburg-Vorpommern
- Coordinates: 53°25′29″N 12°28′48″E
- Country: Germany
- State: Mecklenburg-Vorpommern
- District: Mecklenburgische Seenplatte
- Municipal assoc.: Malchow

Government
  - Mayor: Annemarie Seite

Area
  - Total: 19.95 km^{2} (7.70 sq mi)
- Elevation: 86 m (282 ft)

Population (2025-12-31)
  - Total: 501
  - Density: 25.1/km^{2} (65.0/sq mi)
- Time zone: UTC+01:00 (CET)
  - Summer (DST): UTC+02:00 (CEST)
- Postal codes: 17209, 17213
- Dialling codes: 039932
- Vehicle registration: MÜR
- Website: www.inselstadt-malchow.de

Walow is a municipality in the Mecklenburgische Seenplatte district, in Mecklenburg-Vorpommern, in north-eastern Germany.

== History ==
During the final stages of World War II, on 26–27 February 1945, Lexow (now part of the municipality) was the site of a stopover during the German-organised march of French prisoners of war from the Oflag II-B camp headed westwards.
