= Karchower See =

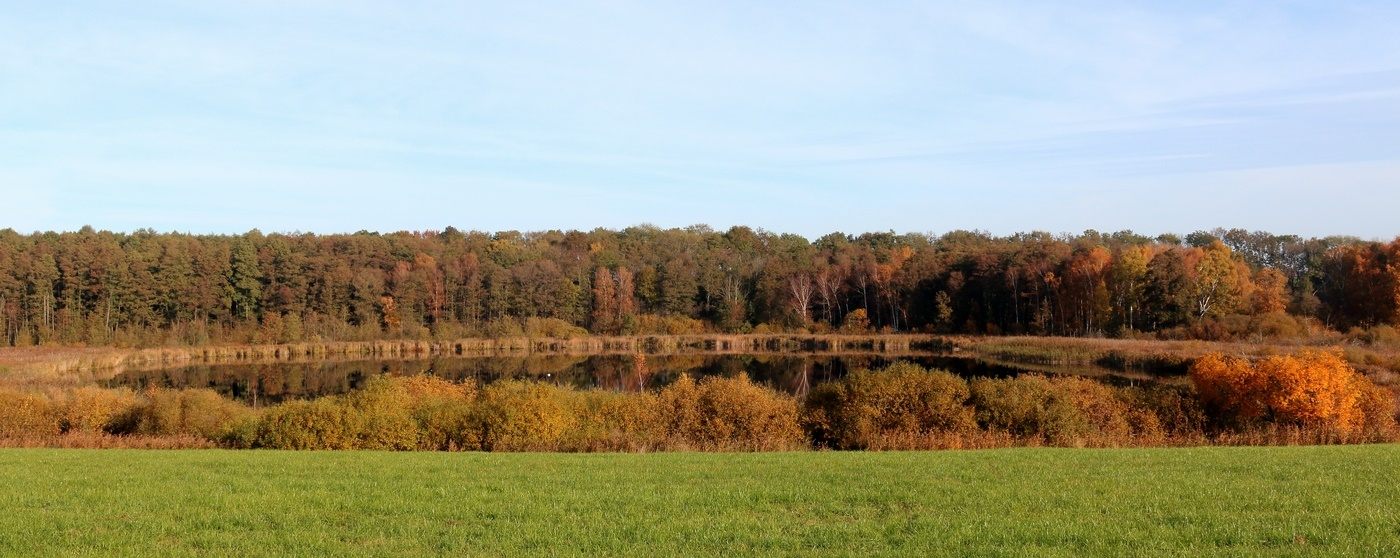

- Location within Mecklenburg-Vorpommern
- Location: Mecklenburgische Seenplatte, Mecklenburg-Vorpommern
- Coordinates: 53°21′12″N 12°31′29″E
- Type: natural freshwater lake
- Basin countries: Germany
- Max. length: 220 m (720 ft)
- Max. width: 170 m (560 ft)
- Surface area: 0.03 km^{2} (0.012 sq mi)
- Surface elevation: 69.5 m (228 ft)

Karchower See is a lake in the Mecklenburgische Seenplatte district in Mecklenburg-Vorpommern, Germany. At an elevation of 69.5 m, its surface area is 0.03 km².
