= Silz, Mecklenburg-Vorpommern =

Silz
- Municipality
- Location of Silz within Mecklenburgische Seenplatte district
- Interactive map of Silz
- Location within Germany Location within Mecklenburg-Vorpommern
- Coordinates: 53°31′00″N 12°26′12″E
- Country: Germany
- State: Mecklenburg-Vorpommern
- District: Mecklenburgische Seenplatte
- Municipal assoc.: Malchow

Government
  - Mayor: Almuth Köhler

Area
  - Total: 10.69 km^{2} (4.13 sq mi)
- Elevation: 69 m (226 ft)

Population (2025-12-31)
  - Total: 323
  - Density: 30.2/km^{2} (78.3/sq mi)
- Time zone: UTC+01:00 (CET)
  - Summer (DST): UTC+02:00 (CEST)
- Postal codes: 17214
- Dialling codes: 039927
- Vehicle registration: MÜR
- Website: www.inselstadt-malchow.de

Silz (German pronunciation: [zɪlts]) is a municipality in the Mecklenburgische Seenplatte district, in Mecklenburg-Vorpommern, Germany.
