= Malchow (surname) =

Malchow is a surname, and may refer to:

- Hal Malchow (1951–2024), political consultant
- Harold C. Malchow, American politician
- Herman Malchow, American politician
- Joseph Malchow, American entrepreneur
- Maic Malchow (born 1962), German cyclist
- Tom Malchow, American swimmer
