= Lake Malchow =

Lake in Germany

Lake Malchow (Mecklenburg)
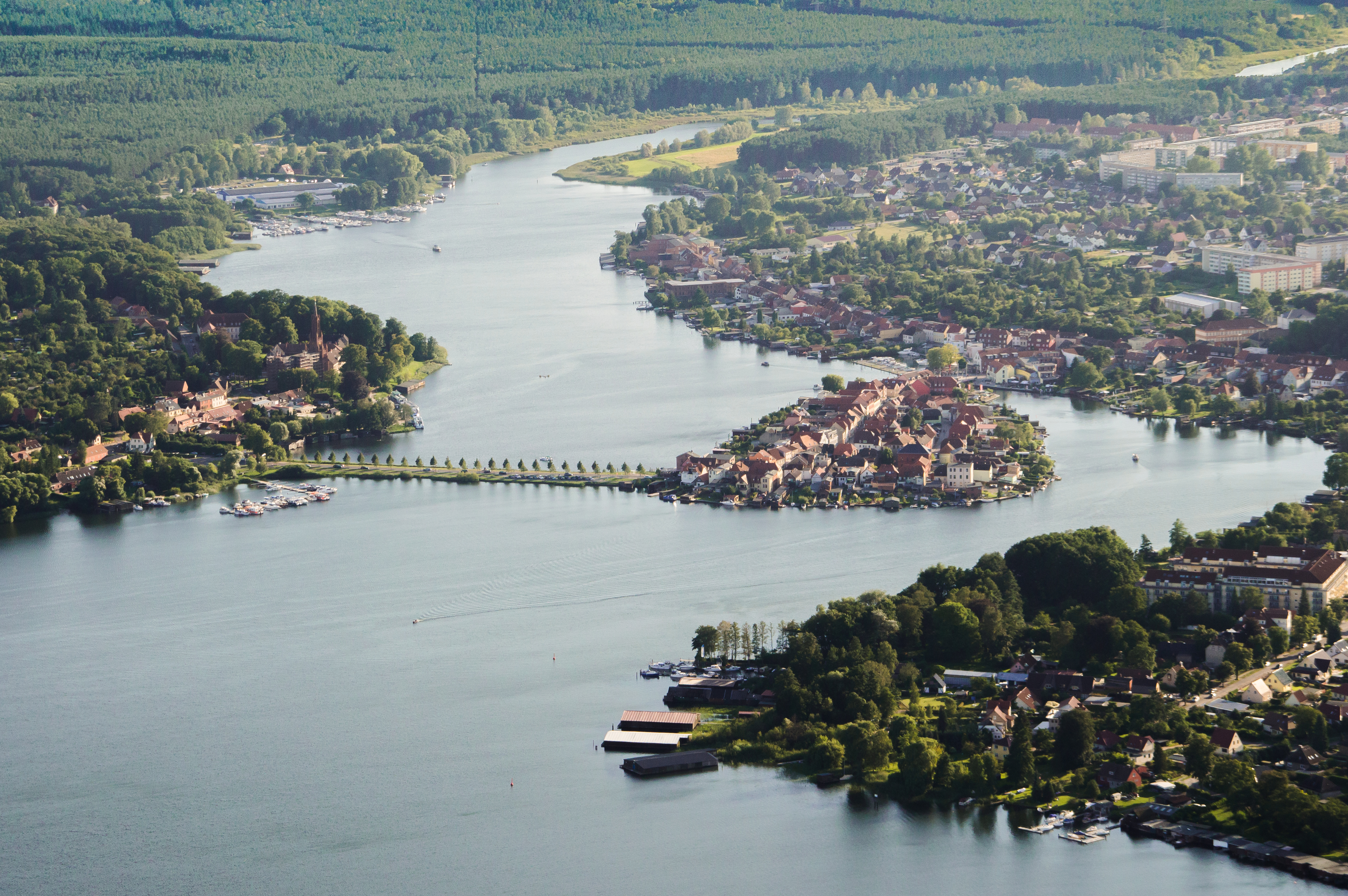
- Lake Malchow
- Interactive map of Lake Malchow (Mecklenburg)
- Location: Landkreis Mecklenburgische Seenplatte, Mecklenburg-Vorpommern, Deutschland
- Coordinates: 53°47′53″N 12°43′41″E
- Basin countries: Germany
- Surface area: 1.25 ha (3.1 acres)

Lake Malchow is an elongated lake within the Mecklenburg Lake Plateau. It is part of a chain of lakes that stretches from the Müritz to the Plauer See.

== Geography ==
The body of water is located entirely within the town of Malchow, is 2.36 km² in size and merges with Fleesensee in the east and Lake Petersdorf in the west via the section of the Elde river known as the Recken. It stretches over 5 kilometres in length (not including the Recken) and a maximum of 950 metres in width. The water level is 62 metres above sea level.

Lake Malchow is part of the federal waterway Müritz-Elde-Wasserstraße with waterway class I; the Wasser- und Schifffahrtsamt (WSA) is responsible.

The direction of flow is from north-east to south-west. The lake basin is divided by the built-up old town island of Malchow and the earth embankment leading onto the island from the east. To the west, there is a connection to the lakeshore via the Malchow swing bridge. Built-up urban areas can be found on the island as well as on the western and eastern shores.

== History ==
Starting as an isolated island, Malchow was connected onto the mainland from 1721 following town fires. A wooden bridge led from the eastern shore to the island until it was destroyed during the Thirty Years' War. Between 1724 and 1846, a private ferry ran in its place. In 1846, the newly built embankment dam (Erddamm (Malchow)) replaced the ferry connection.

The island was connected to the west side by a wooden bridge until 1845, between 1845 and 1863 by a lift bridge and since 1863 by a wooden swing bridge. The steel bridge built in 1912 was blown up in 1945. A new swing bridge was built in 1948/49, which had to be replaced in 1991 and again in 2013.

The water level has changed several times over the centuries, mainly due to human intervention. It was originally around 60 metres above sea level in the 12th century. The water levels within the chain of lakes from Müritz to Plauer See were influenced in several positive and negative steps by damming for the operation of mills and by river regulation. This also had a negative impact on Malchow Island and the bridge from the eastern shore. There is evidence that in the 16th century, citizens complained about the high water level due to damming at the Plau water mill. Today, only the Plau am See barrage at the outflow of Lake Plau has a damming effect on the chain of lakes, with a target water level of 61.61 to 62.36 metres above sea level.

== See also ==
- List of lakes of Mecklenburg-Vorpommern
