= Nossentiner Hütte =

- Municipality
- Location of Nossentiner Hütte within Mecklenburgische Seenplatte district
- Interactive map of Nossentiner Hütte
- Location within Germany Location within Mecklenburg-Vorpommern
- Coordinates: 53°32′N 12°25′E
- Country: Germany
- State: Mecklenburg-Vorpommern
- District: Mecklenburgische Seenplatte
- Municipal assoc.: Malchow

Government
  - Mayor: Birgit Kurth

Area
  - Total: 40.11 km^{2} (15.49 sq mi)
- Elevation: 69 m (226 ft)

Population (2025-12-31)
  - Total: 585
  - Density: 14.6/km^{2} (37.8/sq mi)
- Time zone: UTC+01:00 (CET)
  - Summer (DST): UTC+02:00 (CEST)
- Postal codes: 17214
- Dialling codes: 039927
- Vehicle registration: MÜR

Nossentiner Hütte is a municipality in the Mecklenburgische Seenplatte district, in Mecklenburg-Vorpommern, Germany.
