= Malchow =

Town in Mecklenburg-Vorpommern, Germany

- Town
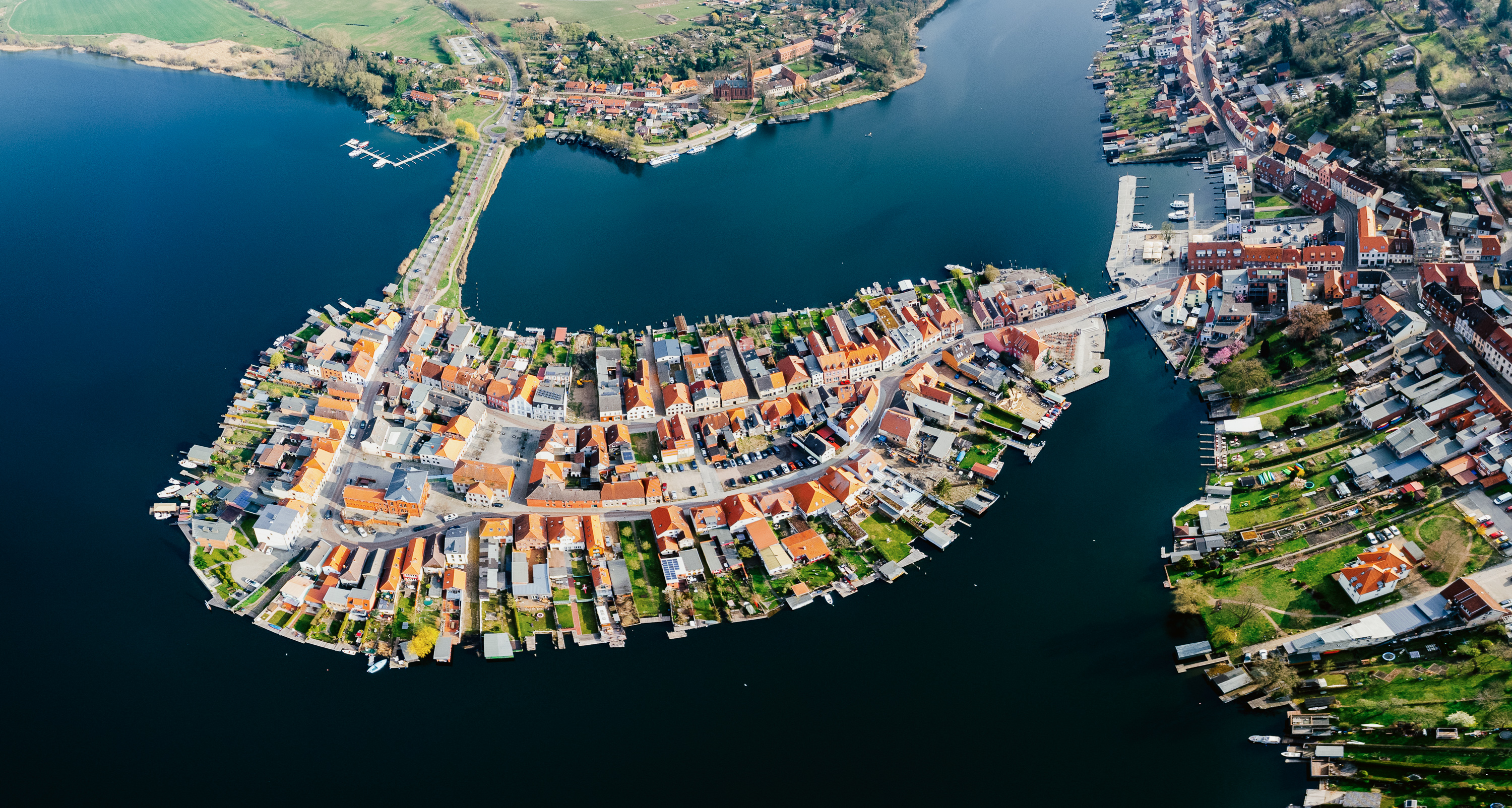
- Main island of Malchow

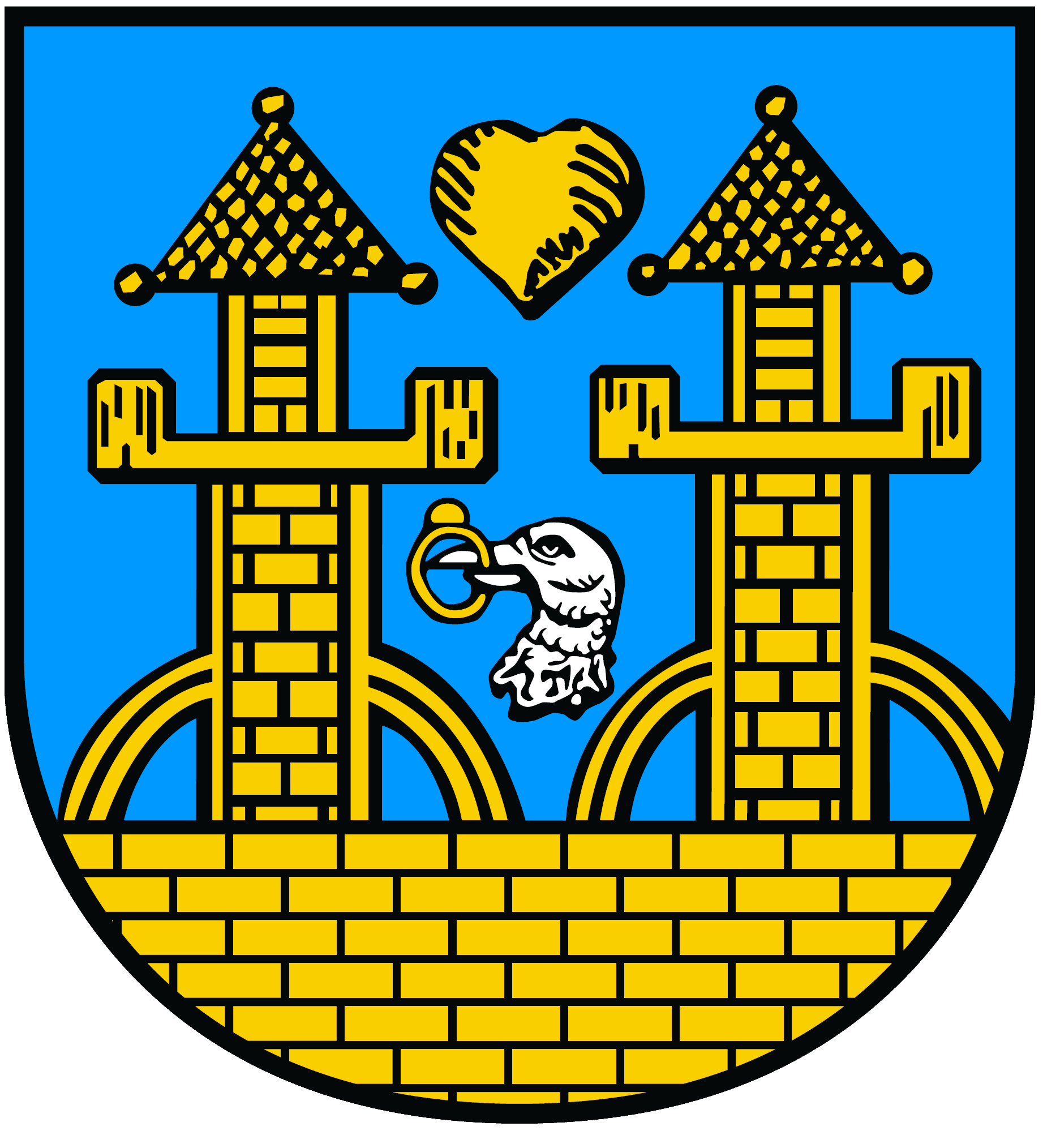
- Coat of arms

- Location of Malchow within Mecklenburgische Seenplatte district
- Interactive map of Malchow
- Location within Germany Location within Mecklenburg-Vorpommern
- Coordinates: 53°28′N 12°25′E
- Country: Germany
- State: Mecklenburg-Vorpommern
- District: Mecklenburgische Seenplatte
- Municipal assoc.: Malchow
- Subdivisions: 6

Government
  - Mayor: René Putzar

Area
  - Total: 44.71 km^{2} (17.26 sq mi)
- Elevation: 75 m (246 ft)

Population (2025-12-31)
  - Total: 6,208
  - Density: 138.9/km^{2} (359.6/sq mi)
- Time zone: UTC+01:00 (CET)
  - Summer (DST): UTC+02:00 (CEST)
- Postal codes: 17213
- Dialling codes: 039932
- Vehicle registration: MSE, AT, DM, MC, MST, MÜR, NZ, RM, WRN
- Website: www.inselstadt-malchow.de

Malchow (German pronunciation: [ˈmalçoː]) is a municipality in the Mecklenburgische Seenplatte district, in Mecklenburg-Western Pomerania, Germany.

== Geography ==
It is situated on the river Elde, 25,5 km west of Waren, and 35 km north of Wittstock.

== History ==
The site of Malchow was a center for Slavic paganism during the Middle Ages. It was sacked by Saxons during the 1147 Wendish Crusade against the Polabian Slavs.

The German town of Malchow, founded on an island between the Plauer See (Lake) and Fleesensee, was first mentioned in writing in 1147 and received a town charter under Schwerin Law in 1235.

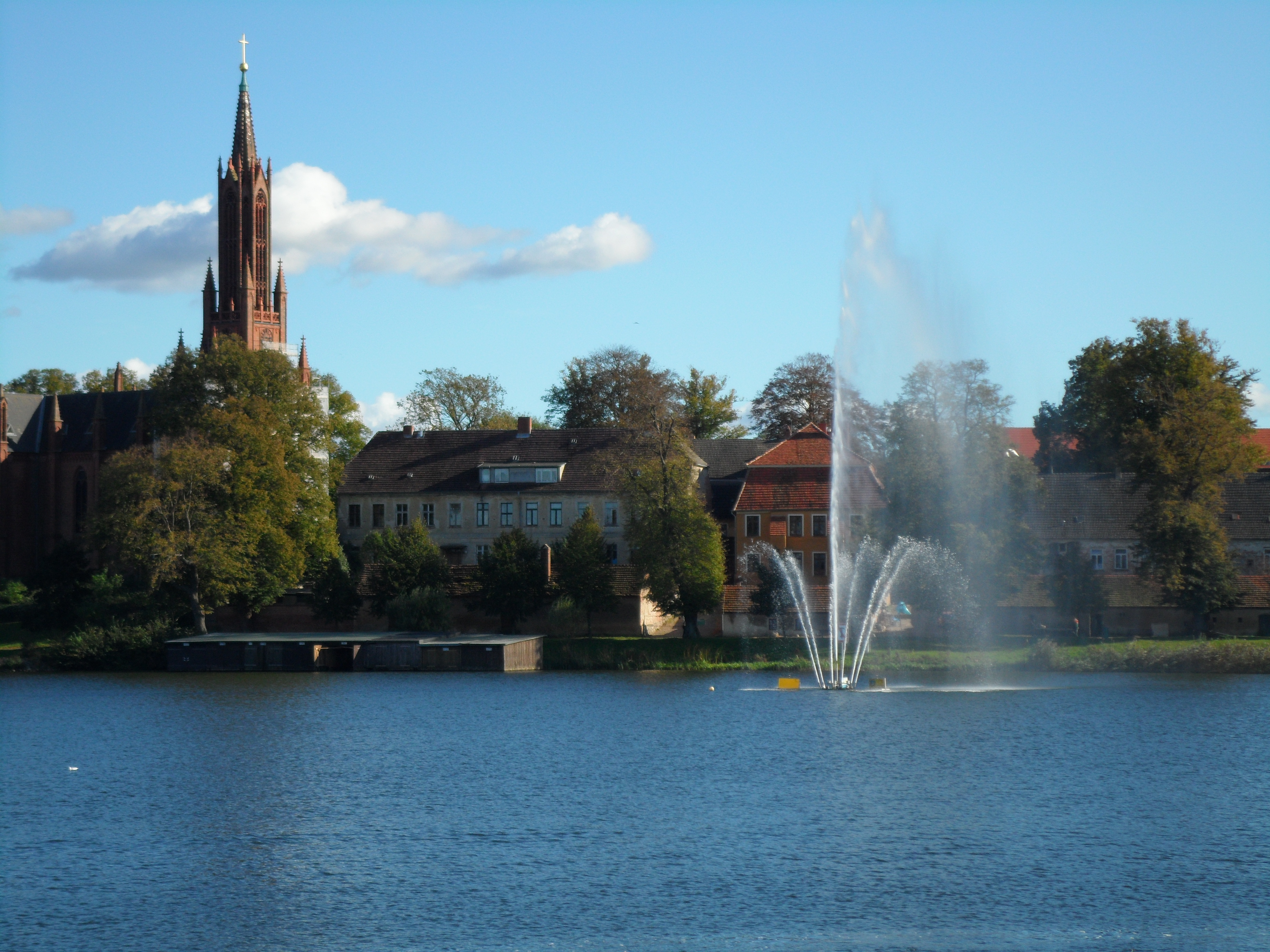
Malchow Abbey

In 1298, Malchow Abbey, a Cistercian nunnery, moved to the south shore of Lake Malchow, opposite the island. Over several following centuries, the town expanded to the mainland in the northwest, to which the original settlement was linked by a succession of bridges, and gradually this mainland settlement came to predominate.

A munitions factory of the Alfred Nobel Co. was established in Malchow in 1938, during the Nazi period, and during World War II hundreds of prisoners of war and also women and children were used as forced labor there. In 1943, the Ravensbrück concentration camp extended to Malchow, and during the next two years many inmates, including numerous Hungarian Jewish women, lost their lives there under appalling conditions.

After the war, Soviet Occupation authorities accused some 30 teen-aged Malchow residents of anti-Soviet activities, and 12 of these eventually lost their lives in Soviet captivity or were executed.

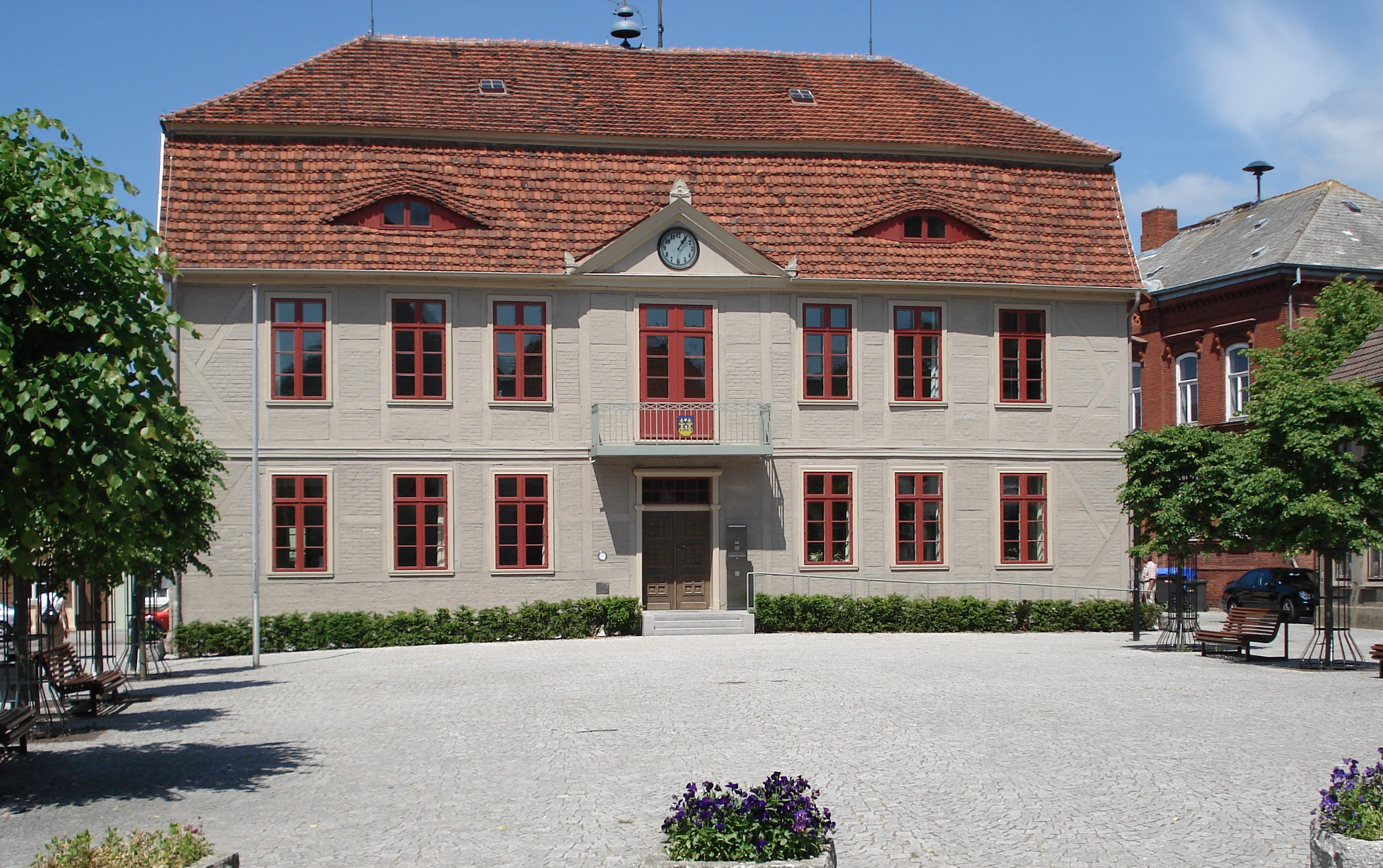
Town hall of Malchow

After the reunification of Germany in 1990, the historic town center of Malchow was extensively restored. Today the former Cistercian abbey houses the Mecklenburg Organ Museum.

== Natural environment ==
The town is surrounded by the lakes of the Mecklenburgische Seenplatte and the woods of the Müritz National Park.

== Notable people ==
- Dietrich von Müller (1891-1961), Generalleutnant of the Wehrmacht
- Konrad von Finckenstein (born 1945), Canadian judge, public servant, federal Conflict of Interest Commissioner
