= Penzliner Land =

- Amt
- Map of Mecklenburgische Seenplatte highlighting Penzliner Land
- Interactive map of Penzliner Land
- Location within Germany Location within Mecklenburg-Vorpommern
- Coordinates: 53°30′N 13°01′E
- Country: Germany
- State: Mecklenburg-Vorpommern
- District: Mecklenburgische Seenplatte
- Seat: Penzlin
- Subdivisions: 4 municipalities

Area
  - Total: 213.04 km^{2} (82.26 sq mi)

Population (2025-12-31)
  - Total: 6,684
  - Density: 31.37/km^{2} (81.26/sq mi)
- Time zone: UTC+01:00 (CET)
  - Summer (DST): UTC+02:00 (CEST)
- Website: www.amt-penzliner-land.de

Penzliner Land is an Amt in the Mecklenburgische Seenplatte district, Germany. The seat of the Amt is in Penzlin. Aver See is a small lake within the Amt.

The Amt Penzliner Land consists of the following municipalities:

- Ankershagen
- Kuckssee
- Möllenhagen
- Penzlin
