= Aver =

Aver may refer to:

== People ==
- Leonid Averyanov, Russian botanist

== Places ==
- Aver lake or Aver See, Germany

== Organisations ==
- AVER (band)
- AVer Information, Taiwanese company
- American Veterans for Equal Rights

== See also ==
- Vow
