= Ankershagen =

- Municipality
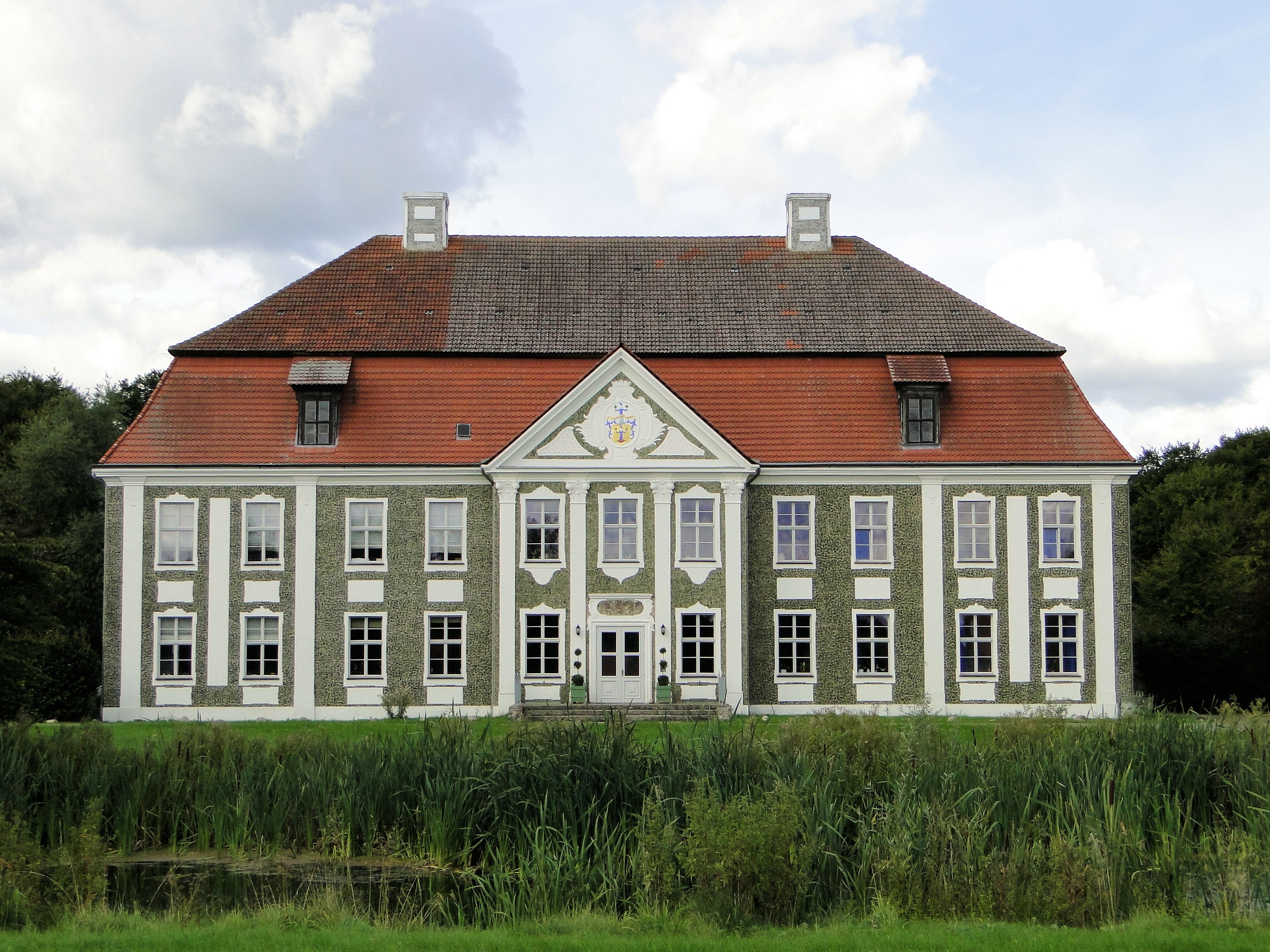
- Gutshaus Rumpshagen in Ankershagen

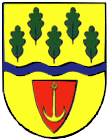
- Coat of arms

- Location of Ankershagen within Mecklenburgische Seenplatte district
- Interactive map of Ankershagen
- Location within Germany Location within Mecklenburg-Vorpommern
- Coordinates: 53°28′36″N 12°58′0″E
- Country: Germany
- State: Mecklenburg-Vorpommern
- District: Mecklenburgische Seenplatte
- Municipal assoc.: Penzliner Land

Government
  - Mayor: Martin Brummund

Area
  - Total: 28.18 km^{2} (10.88 sq mi)
- Elevation: 58 m (190 ft)

Population (2025-12-31)
  - Total: 505
  - Density: 17.9/km^{2} (46.4/sq mi)
- Time zone: UTC+01:00 (CET)
  - Summer (DST): UTC+02:00 (CEST)
- Postal codes: 17219
- Dialling codes: 039921
- Vehicle registration: MÜR
- Website: www.ankershagen.de

Ankershagen is a municipality in the Mecklenburgische Seenplatte district, in Mecklenburg-Vorpommern, Germany. Components of the municipality Ankershagen are Ankershagen, Bocksee, Bornhof, Friedrichsfelde and Rumpshagen.

== Geography ==
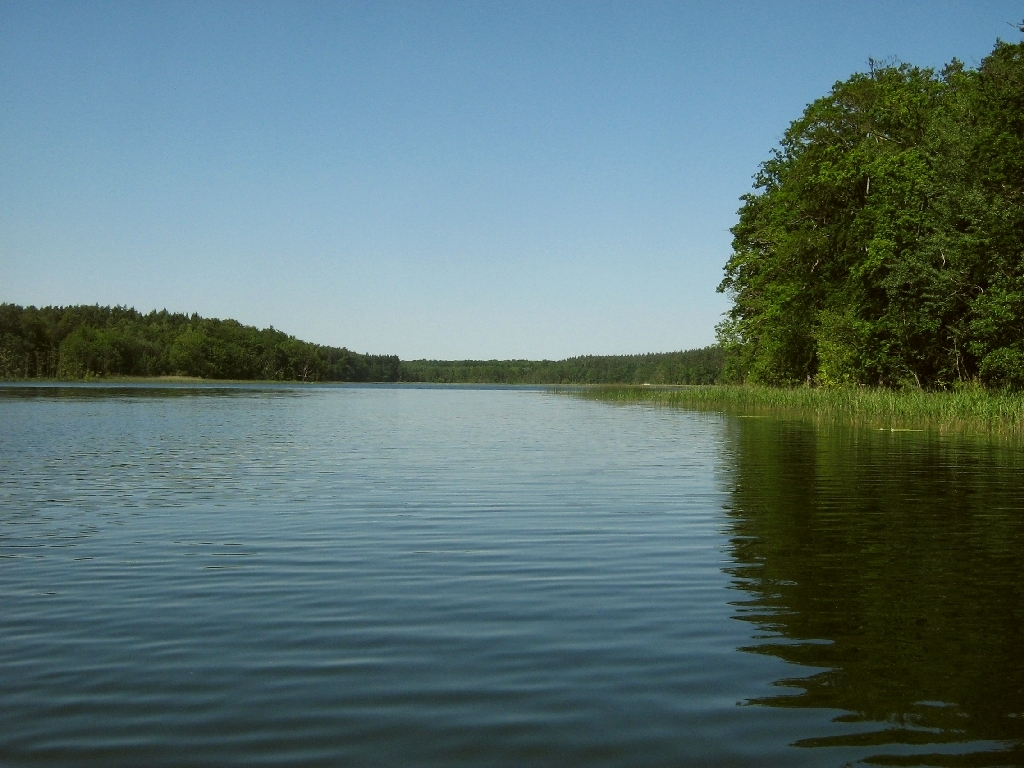

Ankershagen is located directly on the Müritz National Park on an east-west glacial terminal moraine ridge, which forms the watershed between the waters flowing into the Baltic Sea and the North Sea: to the north the streams flow into the Baltic Sea and to the south into the North Sea (Havel and Elbe).

== Main sights ==
- Church Ankershagen
- Manor house Rumpshagen
- Manor house Friedrichsfelde (since 1999 the infopoint of Ankershagen with a chance to see Storks) near the Müritz National Park
- Heinrich Schliemann Museum
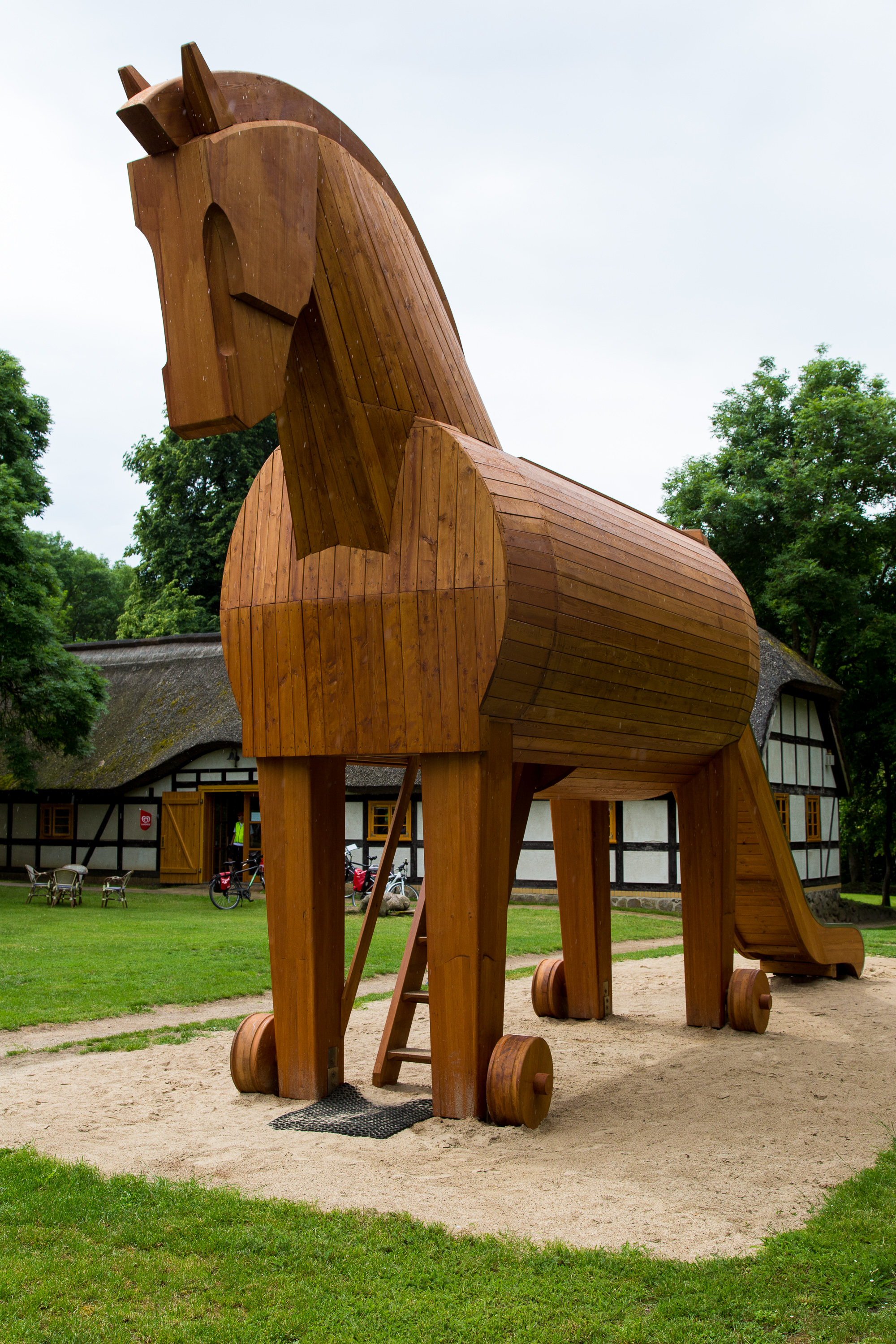
Trojan horse at the museum

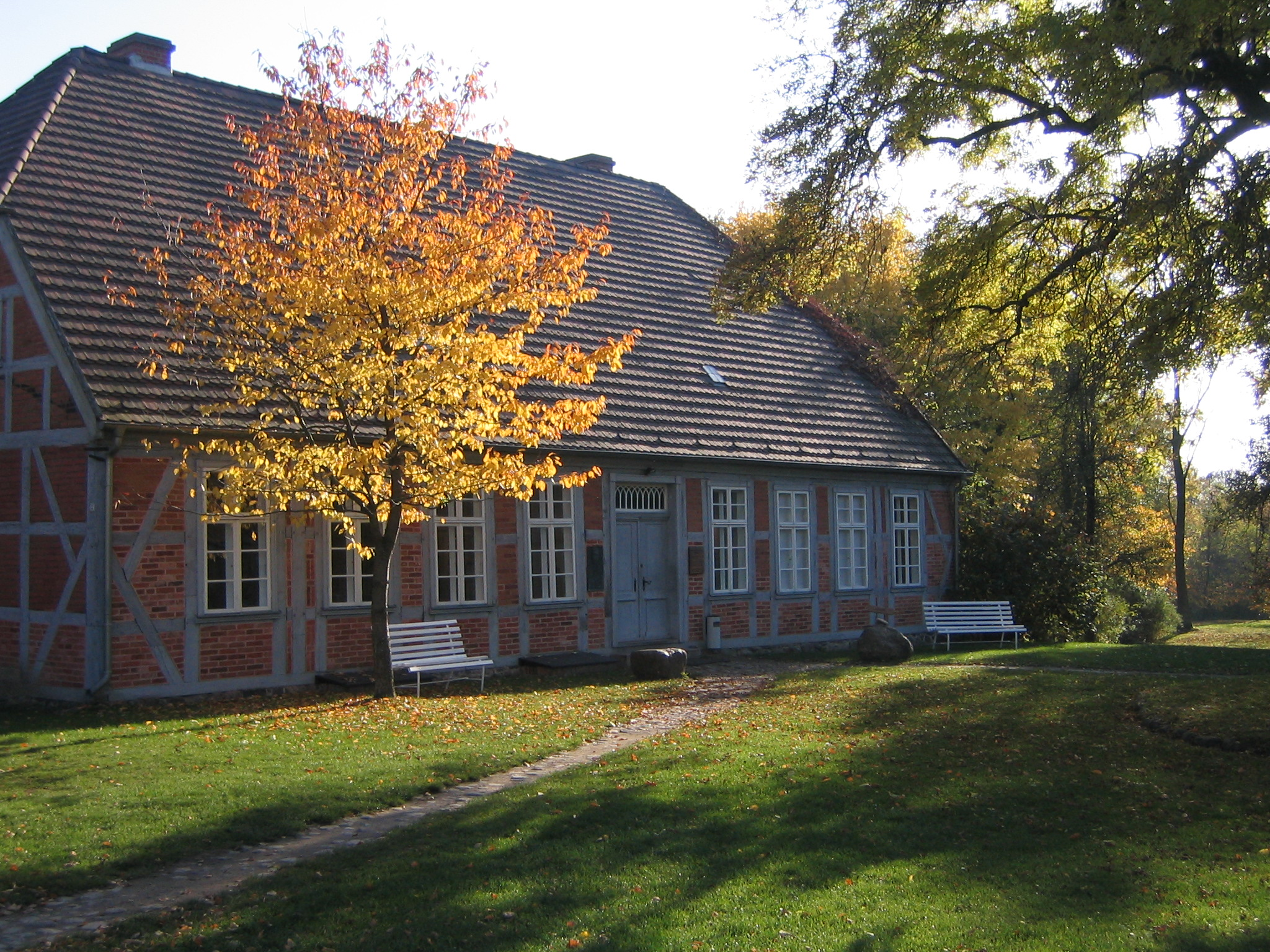
Heinrich Schliemann Museum, formerly the vicarage

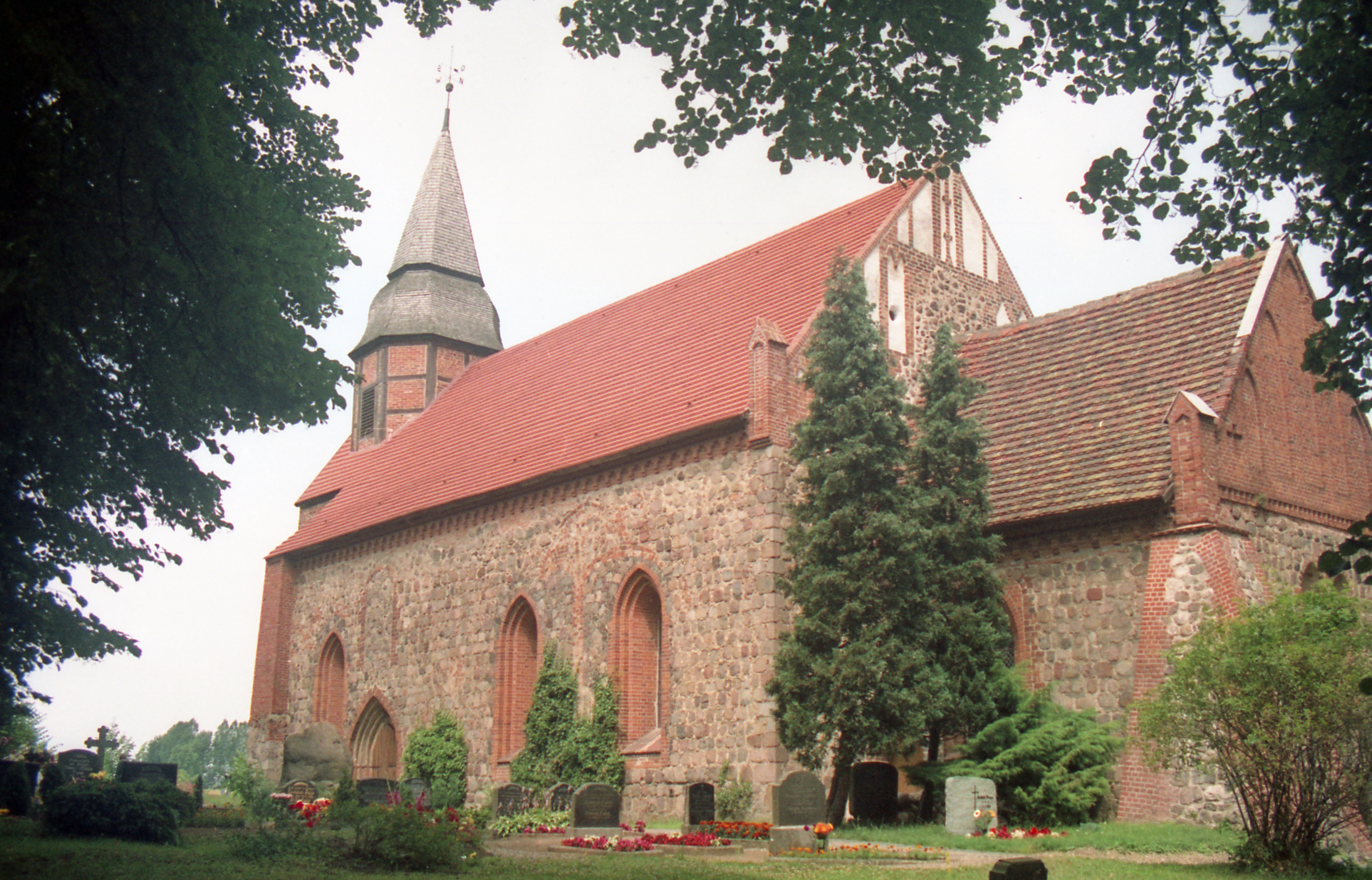
Village church in Ankershagen

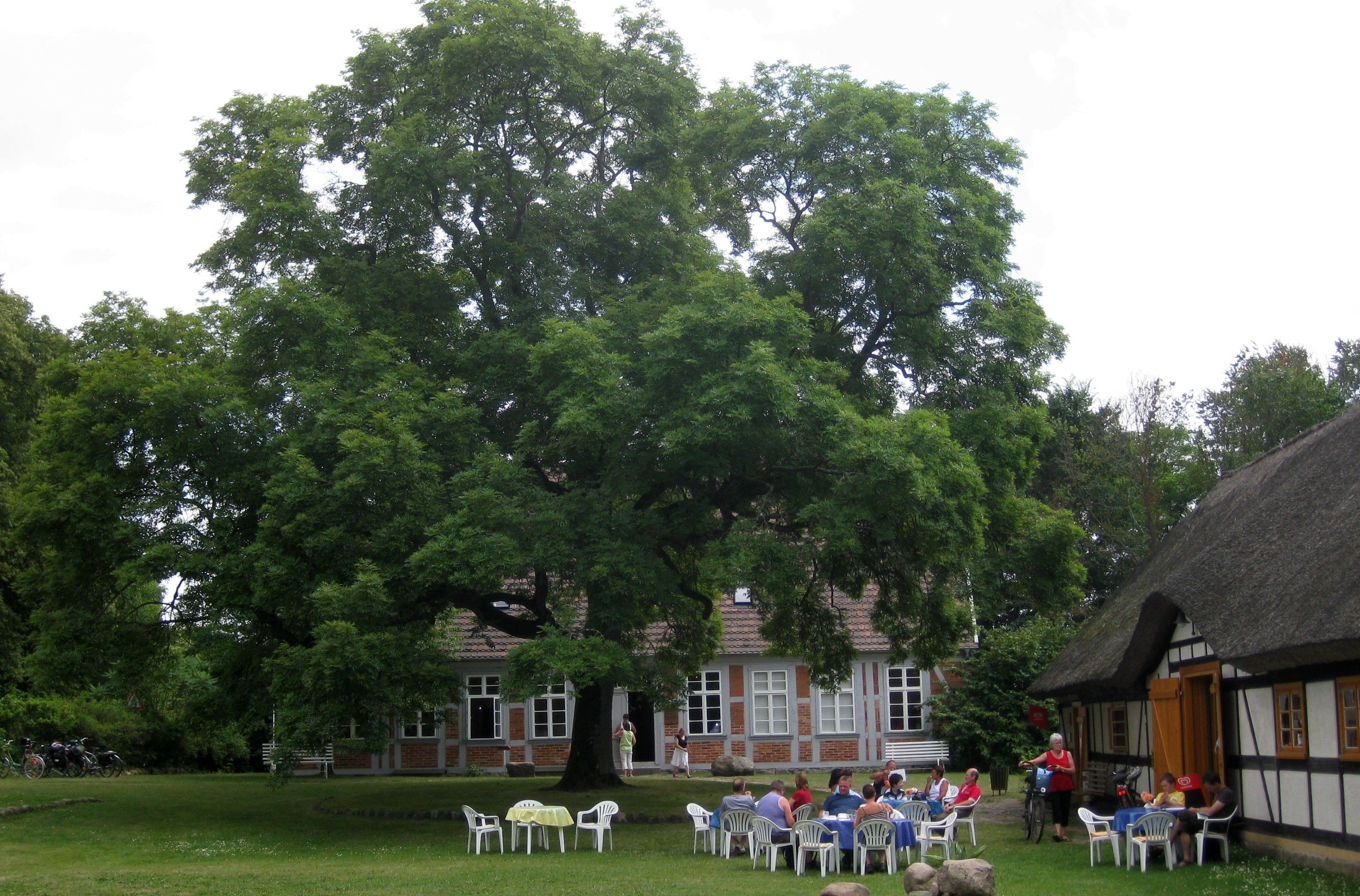
Ash in Ankershagen

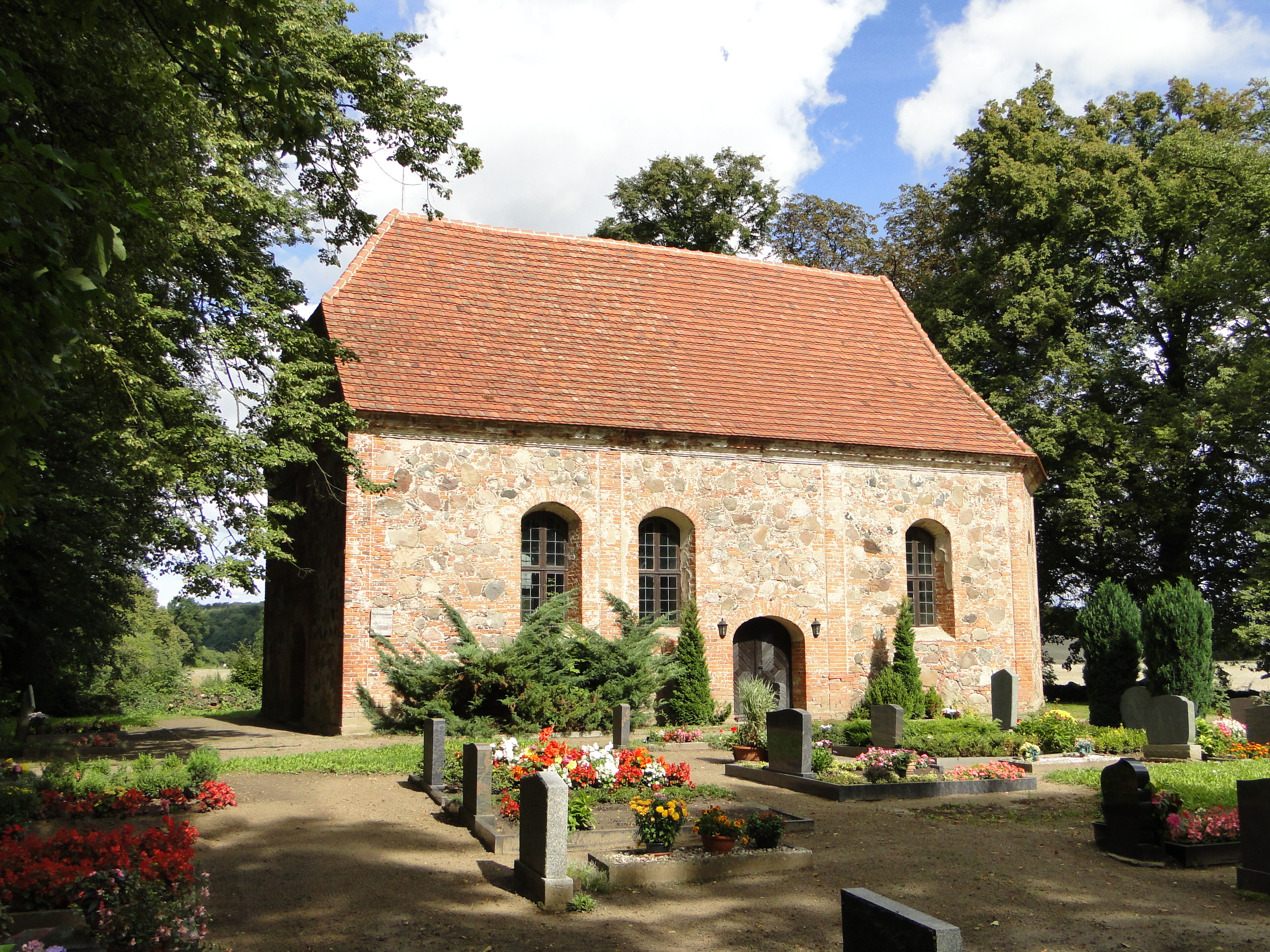
Church in Rumpshagen

== People ==
- Johann Heinrich Voß (German poet and translator) in Ankershagen 1769 - 1792
- Heinrich Schliemann (German businessman and archaeologist, and an advocate of the historical reality of places mentioned in the works of Homer)
