= Lapitz =

- Ortsteil of Kuckssee
- Interactive map of Lapitz
- Location within Germany Location within Mecklenburg-Vorpommern
- Coordinates: 53°32′42″N 13°05′12″E
- Country: Germany
- State: Mecklenburg-Vorpommern
- District: Mecklenburgische Seenplatte
- Municipality: Kuckssee

Area
  - Total: 6.41 km^{2} (2.47 sq mi)
- Elevation: 67 m (220 ft)

Population (2011-12-31)
  - Total: 169
  - Density: 26.4/km^{2} (68.3/sq mi)
- Time zone: UTC+01:00 (CET)
  - Summer (DST): UTC+02:00 (CEST)
- Postal codes: 17217
- Dialling codes: 03962
- Vehicle registration: MÜR
- Website: amt-penzliner-land.de

Lapitz (German pronunciation: [ˈlaːpɪts]) is a village and a former municipality in the Mecklenburgische Seenplatte district, in Mecklenburg-Vorpommern, Germany. Since 1 January 2012, it is part of the municipality Kuckssee.
