= Heinrich Schliemann Museum =

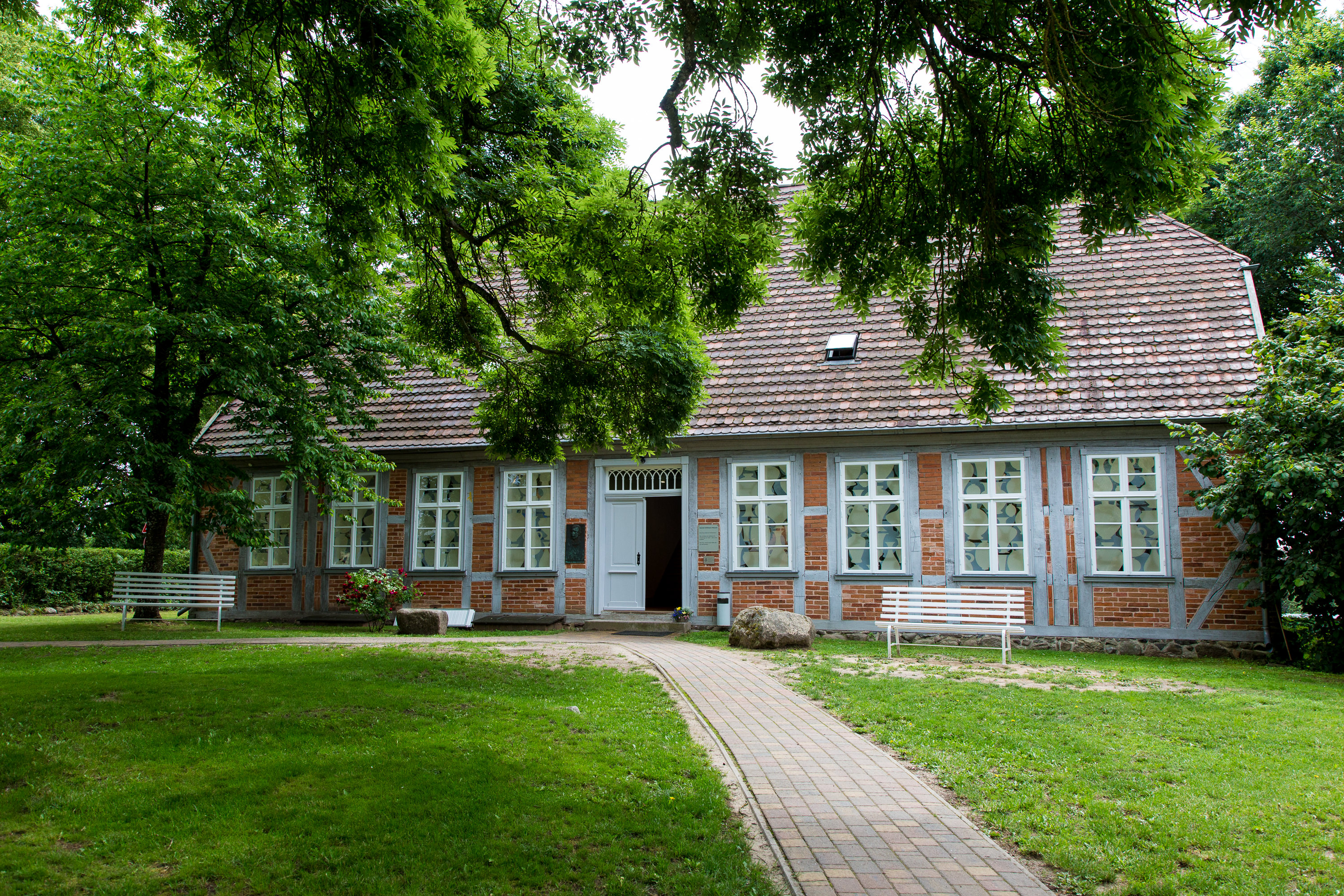

General information
- Location: Lindenallee 1; 17219 Ankershagen/Mecklenburg, Germany
- Coordinates: 53°29′1.9″N 12°57′28.8″E

Website
- https://www.schliemann-museum.de/home/

The Heinrich Schliemann Museum is a cultural site in Ankershagen, in Mecklenburg-Vorpommern, Germany. It is a museum about the life and work of the businessman and amateur archaeologist Heinrich Schliemann (1822–1890), in the building, formerly a rectory, where Schliemann spent his childhood years.

== History ==
Heinrich Schliemann was born in Neubukow in 1822. His father was a pastor; the family moved to this 18th-century rectory in 1823. He lived here until 1832, a year after the death of his mother, when he moved to Kalkhorst to live with his father's brother. From 1834 he attended school in Neustrelitz.

== Exhibition ==
The museum was opened in 1980.

There is a permanent exhibition, in ten themed rooms, about his childhood, the subsequent years including periods as a businessman in Russia and banker in America, and his work as an amateur archaeologist, discovering the Mycenaean culture and excavating the site of Troy. Temporary exhibitions, about Schliemann or a different topic, are held on the attic floor.

== Research ==
The museum has been established as a centre for Schliemann research. Its archive includes Schliemann's original letters, and copies of his 18 excavation diaries. The Heinrich-Schliemann-Gesellschaft (Heinrich Schliemann Society), founded in 1991, gives regular lectures about his life and work.
