= Kuckssee =

- Municipality
- Location of Kuckssee within Mecklenburgische Seenplatte district
- Interactive map of Kuckssee
- Location within Germany Location within Mecklenburg-Vorpommern
- Coordinates: 53°32′N 13°6′E
- Country: Germany
- State: Mecklenburg-Vorpommern
- District: Mecklenburgische Seenplatte
- Municipal assoc.: Penzliner Land

Area
  - Total: 19.19 km^{2} (7.41 sq mi)
- Elevation: 67 m (220 ft)

Population (2025-12-31)
  - Total: 575
  - Density: 30.0/km^{2} (77.6/sq mi)
- Time zone: UTC+01:00 (CET)
  - Summer (DST): UTC+02:00 (CEST)
- Postal codes: 17217
- Dialling codes: 03962
- Vehicle registration: MÜR

Kuckssee (German pronunciation: [ˈkʊkszeː]) is a municipality in the Mecklenburgische Seenplatte district, in Mecklenburg-Vorpommern, Germany. It was formed on 1 January 2012 by the merger of the former municipalities Krukow, Lapitz and Puchow.

== Story ==
The municipality of Kuckssee was created on 1 January 2012 through the merger of the previously independent municipalities of Krukow, Lapitz and Puchow.

== Geography ==
The municipality is located approximately ten kilometers west of Neubrandenburg's city center and borders the city of Penzlin to the south. The municipality's lakes include Lake Malliner, through which the Aalbach stream flows, Lake Ziesken, Lake Kucks, Lake Lapitzer, Lake Wokuhl, and Lake Salzsee. The 110-hectare nature reserve of Lake Kucks and Lake Lapitzer lies almost entirely within the municipality.

Districts are Krukow, Lapitz, Puchow and Rahnenfelde.

== Culture and sights ==
- Krukow Manor House (Castle)
- Krukow fieldstone church
- Lapitz village church
- Puchow Manor House from 1910 with two gatehouses, manager's house, farm buildings and manor park
- Lapitz Manor House from 1908
