= Möllenhagen =

- Municipality
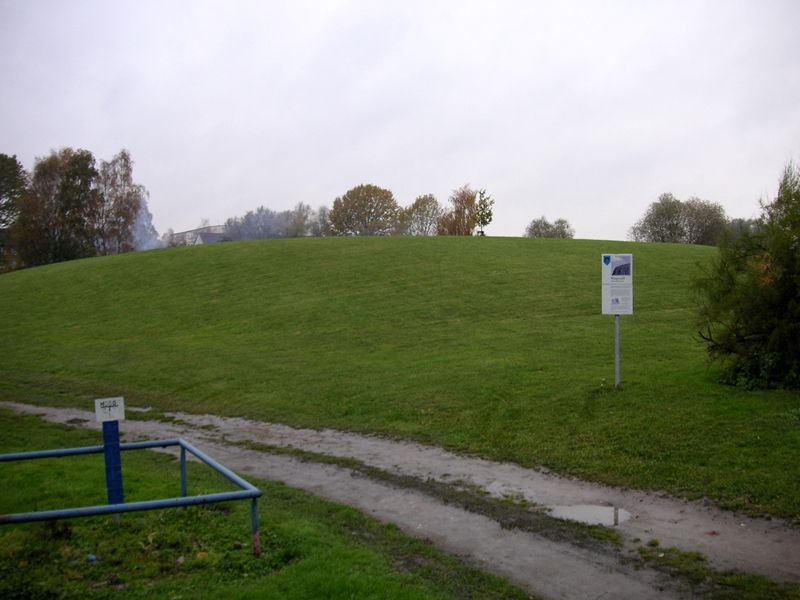
- Burgwall Möllenhagen in Möllenhagen

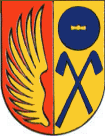
- Coat of arms

- Location of Möllenhagen within Mecklenburgische Seenplatte district
- Interactive map of Möllenhagen
- Location within Germany Location within Mecklenburg-Vorpommern
- Coordinates: 53°32′N 12°56′E
- Country: Germany
- State: Mecklenburg-Vorpommern
- District: Mecklenburgische Seenplatte
- Municipal assoc.: Penzliner Land

Government
  - Mayor: Reinhold Amenda

Area
  - Total: 49.80 km^{2} (19.23 sq mi)
- Elevation: 90 m (300 ft)

Population (2025-12-31)
  - Total: 1,568
  - Density: 31.49/km^{2} (81.55/sq mi)
- Time zone: UTC+01:00 (CET)
  - Summer (DST): UTC+02:00 (CEST)
- Postal codes: 17219
- Dialling codes: 039928, 039921
- Vehicle registration: MÜR
- Website: www.penzliner-land.de

Möllenhagen is a municipality in the Mecklenburgische Seenplatte district, in Mecklenburg-Vorpommern, Germany.

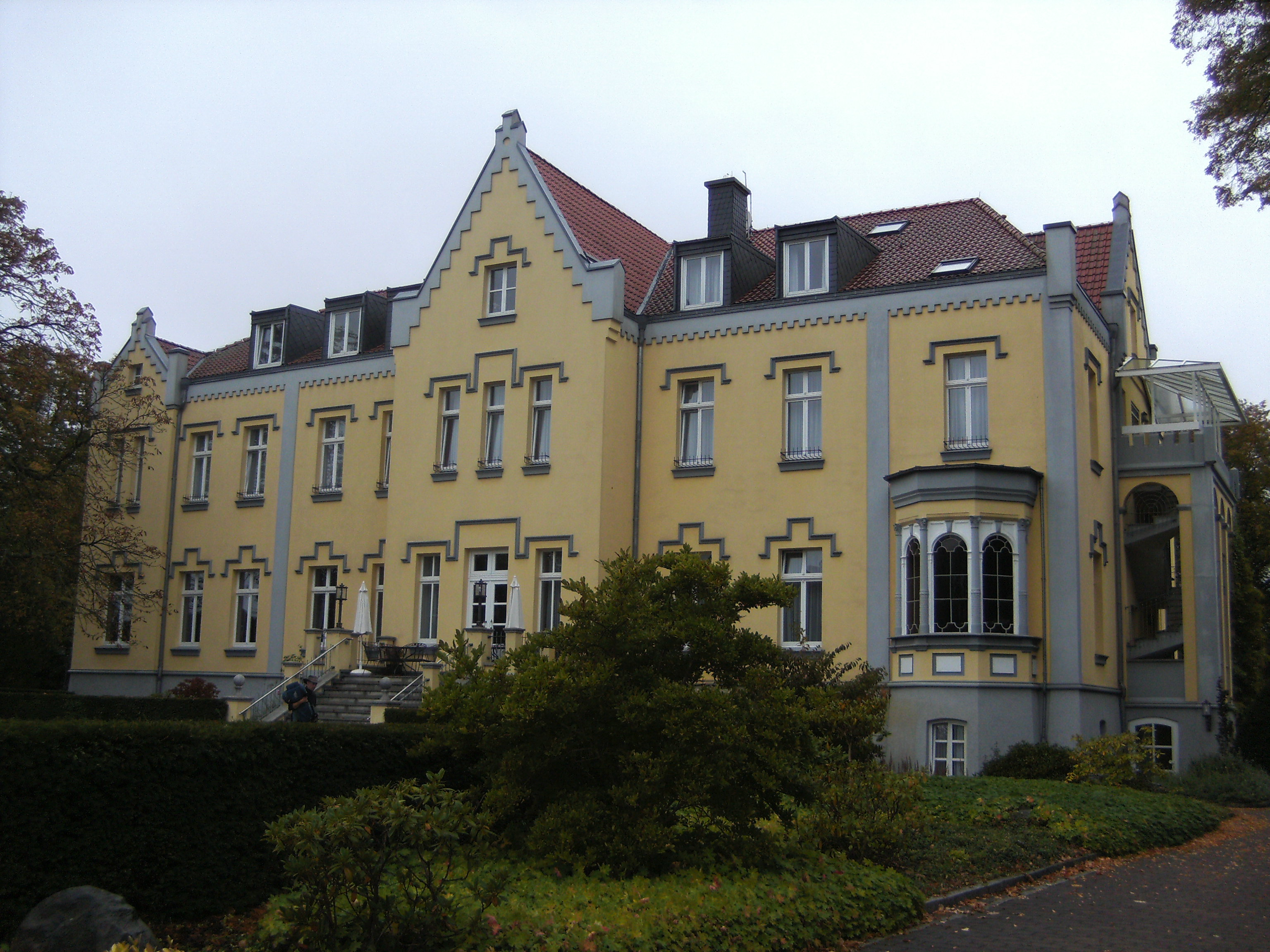
Wendorf Castle in Möllenhagen-Wendorf

== Personalities ==
- Adolf Georg of Maltzan (1877–1927), German diplomat
- Friedrich Griese (1890–1975), writer, important representative of the Mecklenburg local literature and blood-and-soil poet
