= Puchow =

- Ortsteil of Kuckssee
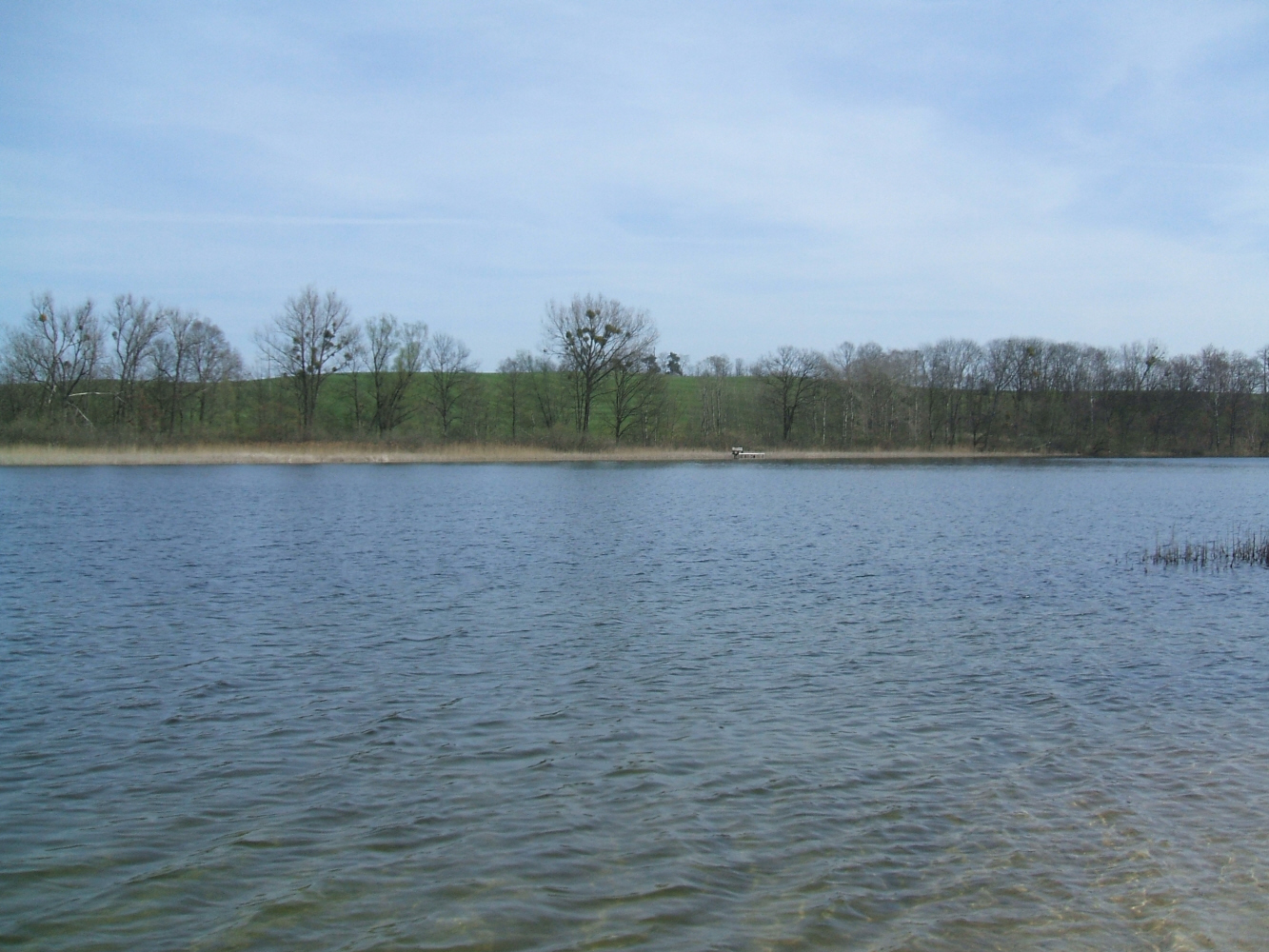
- Zieskensee (River) in Puchow, Mecklenburg-Vorpommern
- Interactive map of Puchow
- Location within Germany Location within Mecklenburg-Vorpommern
- Coordinates: 53°32′N 13°04′E
- Country: Germany
- State: Mecklenburg-Vorpommern
- District: Mecklenburgische Seenplatte
- Municipality: Kuckssee

Area
  - Total: 5.65 km^{2} (2.18 sq mi)
- Elevation: 47 m (154 ft)

Population (2011-12-31)
  - Total: 141
  - Density: 25.0/km^{2} (64.6/sq mi)
- Time zone: UTC+01:00 (CET)
  - Summer (DST): UTC+02:00 (CEST)
- Postal codes: 17217
- Dialling codes: 03962
- Vehicle registration: MÜR
- Website: amt-penzliner-land.de

Puchow (German pronunciation: [ˈpuːxoː]) is a village and a former municipality in the Mecklenburgische Seenplatte district, in Mecklenburg-Vorpommern, Germany. Since 1 January 2012, it is part of the municipality Kuckssee. The former municipality of Puchow comprised both Puchow and its hamlet Rahnenfelde about 1.5 km to the south along K21 to Penzlin.
