= Krukow, Mecklenburg-Vorpommern =

Krukow
- Ortsteil of Kuckssee
- Interactive map of Krukow
- Location within Germany Location within Mecklenburg-Vorpommern
- Coordinates: 53°31′N 13°07′E
- Country: Germany
- State: Mecklenburg-Vorpommern
- District: Mecklenburgische Seenplatte
- Municipality: Kuckssee

Area
  - Total: 7.13 km^{2} (2.75 sq mi)
- Elevation: 67 m (220 ft)

Population (2011-12-31)
  - Total: 190
  - Density: 27/km^{2} (69/sq mi)
- Time zone: UTC+01:00 (CET)
  - Summer (DST): UTC+02:00 (CEST)
- Postal codes: 17217
- Dialling codes: 03962
- Vehicle registration: MÜR
- Website: amt-penzliner-land.de

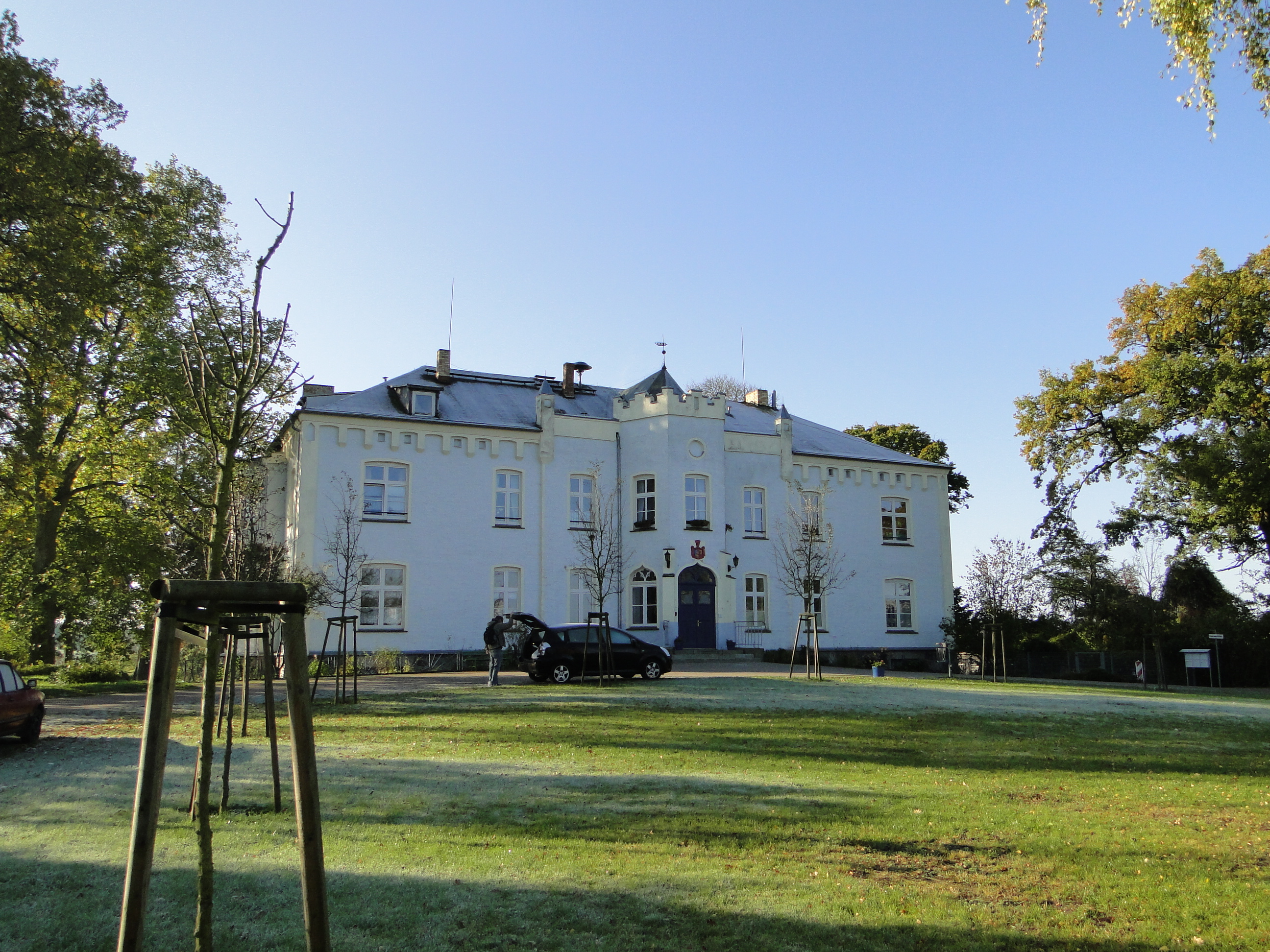
Manor house in Krukow

Krukow (German pronunciation: [ˈkʁuːkoː]) is a village and a former municipality in the Mecklenburgische Seenplatte district, in Mecklenburg-Vorpommern, Germany. Since 1 January 2012, it is part of the municipality Kuckssee.
