= Friedrich Griese =

German novelist (1890–1975)

Friedrich Griese (2 October 1890, Lehsten – 1 July 1975) was a German novelist. He was associated with the nationalist literary movement during the Third Reich.

Griese wrote mostly about peasant life in northern Germany. His most important books were written before the advent of the Nazi government in 1933, so he cannot be considered so much a proponent of Nazi ideologies as a precursor to them. He wrote his first autobiography, Mein Leben, at the height of his popularity in 1934, his second one, Leben in dieser Zeit, in 1970.

Griese's novels are nostalgic both in their interest in medieval German literature and their enthusiasm for an idealized conception of the spirit of the German peasant. In this sense they are solidly within the Blut und Boden (Blood and Soil) school popular during the Third Reich. However, according to Charles Albert Schumann, he is more interested in connection to one's ancestors than in race as it was popularly conceived at the time. His best-known novels are Feuer, Winter, and Die Weissköpfe, all stories of agrarian life in 19th and 20th century Germany.

After the Second World War, Griese was briefly interned at the infamous NKVD Special Camp Fünfeichen. However, he was, after his release, able to write, principally as a scholar of Fritz Reuter, during the postwar years. He published one novel, Der Zug der Grossen Vögel, during this period. Like most popular Third Reich authors, he is largely forgotten in contemporary Germany, and his books can only be obtained second-hand.

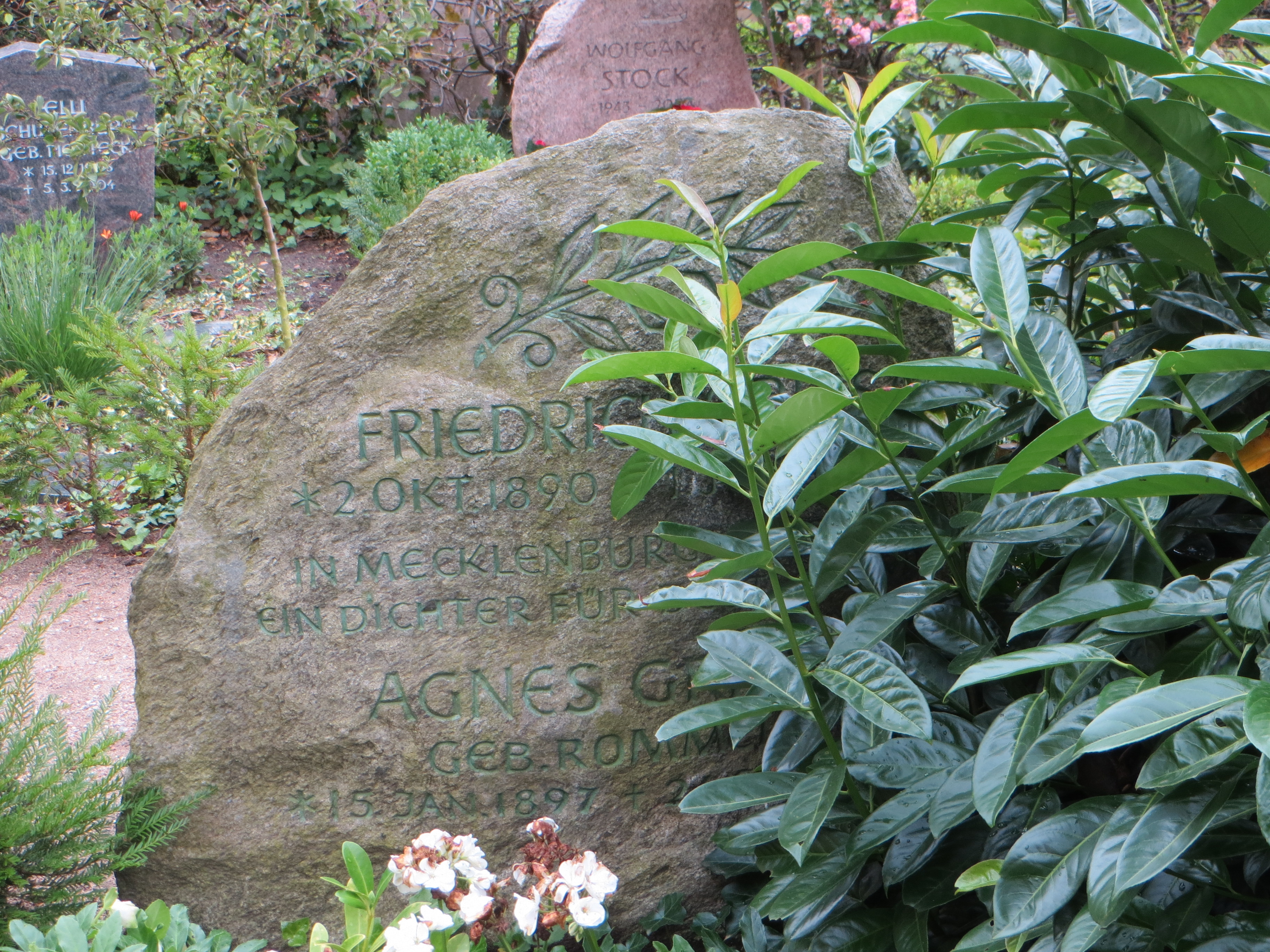
Grave (2014)

In 1960, Griese became the first president of the newly established Fritz Reuter Gesellschaft (F. R. Society). In recent years the Literaturtage in Lehsten, a colloquium in Bad Doberan, the Deutsches Literaturarchiv in Marbach, and the Fritz Reuter Literary Archive (Fritz Reuter Literaturarchiv) Hans-Joachim Griephan Berlin have paid scholarly attention to his works. A collection of his letters and manuscripts are one of the focal points of the Fritz Reuter Literaturarchiv which also keeps an index of the more than 600 letters from and to Friedrich Griese.

== Major works ==
=== Fiction ===
- Feuer, 1921.
- Ur, 1922.
- Das Korn rauscht, 1923.
- Alte Glocken, 1925.
- Die letzte Garbe, 1927.
- Winter, 1927.
- Die Flucht, 1928.
- Tal der Armen, 1929.
- Der ewige Acker, 1930.
- Der Herzog, 1931.
- Das Dorf der Mädchen, 1932.
- Der Saatgang, 1932.
- Das letzte Gesicht, 1934.
- Die Wagenburg, 1935.
- Bäume im Wind, 1937.
- Das Kind des Torfmachers, 1937.
- Wind im Luch, 1937.
- Die Weißköpfe, 1939.
- Die Dörfer der Jugend, 1947.
- Der Zug der großen Vögel, 1951.
- Der Wind weht nicht, wohin er will, 1960.
- Das nie vergessene Gesicht, 1962.
- So lange die Erde steht, 1965.
- Eure guten Jahre, 1974.

=== Nonfiction ===
- Mein Leben, 1934.
- Rede, gehalten bei der Stehr-Feier der Deutschen Akademie der Dichtung, 1934.
- Fritz Reuter, 1938.
- Leben in dieser Zeit, 1970.
