= Aver See =

Lake in Mecklenburg-Vorpommern, Germany

- Location within Mecklenburg-Vorpommern
- Location: Mecklenburgische Seenplatte, Mecklenburg-Vorpommern
- Coordinates: 53.51077°N 13.02647°E
- Basin countries: Germany
- Surface area: 0.06 km^{2} (0.023 sq mi)
- Surface elevation: 47.8 m (157 ft)

Aver See is a lake in the Mecklenburgische Seenplatte district in Mecklenburg-Vorpommern, Germany. At an elevation of 47.8 metres (157 ft), its surface covers 0.06 square kilometres (0.023 mi^{2}).
