= List of lakes of Mecklenburgische Seenplatte =

Lakes in the Mecklenburgische Seenplatte district, Mecklenburg-Vorpommern, Germany are:

Lake Name	Elevation	Surface Area
Nietingsee	65 m (213 ft)	0.0085 km^{2} (0.0033 sq mi)
Bergsee	62.8 m (206 ft)	0.55 km^{2} (0.21 mi^{2})
Besenreepsee	57 m (187 ft)	0.084 km^{2} (0.032 mi^{2})
Buchsee	58.9 m (193 ft)	0.089 km^{2} (0.034 mi^{2})
Bullowsee	60.3 m (198 ft)	0.16 km^{2} (0.062 mi^{2})
Caarpsee	58.8 m (193 ft)	0.412 km^{2} (0.159 mi^{2})
Camminer See	61 m (200 ft)	0.584 km^{2} (0.225 mi^{2})
Canower See	56.1 m (184 ft)	0.19 km^{2} (0.073 mi^{2})
Carpiner See	64.2 m (211 ft)	0.043 km^{2} (0.017 mi^{2})
Claassee	62.1 m (204 ft)	0.106 km^{2} (0.041 mi^{2})
Dabelowsee	59.9 m (197 ft)	1.01 km^{2} (0.39 mi^{2})
Dambecker See	72 m (236 ft)	0.541 km^{2} (0.209 mi^{2})
Demminer See	66.5 m (218 ft)	0.087 km^{2} (0.034 mi^{2})
Dolgener See	97.8 m (321 ft)	0.69 km^{2} (0.27 mi^{2})
Domjüchsee	64 m (210 ft)	0.247 km^{2} (0.095 mi^{2})
Drewensee	54.9 m (180 ft)	2.56 km^{2} (0.99 mi^{2})
Drewitzer See	62.4 m (205 ft)	6.92 km^{2} (2.67 mi^{2})
Falkenhäger See	64.8 m (213 ft)	0.01 km^{2} (0.0039 mi^{2})
Feldberger Haussee	84.3 m (277 ft)	1.31 km^{2} (0.51 mi^{2})
Fleesensee	62 m (203 ft)	10.78 km^{2} (4.16 mi^{2})
Galenbecker See	9.6 m (31 ft)	5.9 km^{2} (2.3 mi^{2})
Gobenowsee	57.5 m (189 ft)	1.35 km^{2} (0.52 mi^{2})
Große Wünnow	62.1 m (204 ft)	0.28 km^{2} (0.11 mi^{2})
Großer Brückentinsee	59.9 m (197 ft)	1.34 km^{2} (0.52 mi^{2})
Großer Fürstenseer See	63.8 m (209 ft)	2.12 km^{2} (0.82 mi^{2})
Großer Pälitzsee	56.1 m (184 ft)	2.58 km^{2} (1.00 mi^{2})
Großer Stadtsee	43.9 m (144 ft)	0.88 km^{2} (0.34 mi^{2})
Großer Varchentiner See	34.1 m (112 ft)	1.81 km^{2} (0.70 mi^{2})
Großer Varchentiner See	34.1 m (112 ft)	1.81 km^{2} (0.70 mi^{2})
Großer Weißer See	59.8 m (196 ft)	0.27 km^{2} (0.10 mi^{2})
Großer Zillmannsee	66.5 m (218 ft)	0.141 km^{2} (0.054 mi^{2})
Hofsee	65 m (213 ft)	0.139 km^{2} (0.054 mi^{2})
Ivenacker See	39.5 m (130 ft)	0.97 km^{2} (0.37 mi^{2})
Jabelscher See	62.1 m (204 ft)	2.34 km^{2} (0.90 mi^{2})
Käbelicksee	62.4 m (205 ft)	2.64 km^{2} (1.02 mi^{2})
Karchower See	69.5 m (228 ft)	0.03 km^{2} (0.012 mi^{2})
Kastorfer See	45.3 m (149 ft)	0.64 km^{2} (0.25 mi^{2})
Kleiner Labussee	57.5 m (189 ft)	0.15 km^{2} (0.058 mi^{2})
Kleiner Pälitzsee	56.1 m (184 ft)	2.01 km^{2} (0.78 mi^{2})
Kleiner Weißer See	59 m (194 ft)	0.02 km^{2} (0.0077 mi^{2})
Kleiner Zillmannsee	66.5 m (218 ft)	0.124 km^{2} (0.048 mi^{2})
Kleinvielener See	51.1 m (168 ft)	0.98 km^{2} (0.38 mi^{2})
Klenzsee	57.5 m (189 ft)	0.74 km^{2} (0.29 mi^{2})
Kogeler See	90.8 m (298 ft)	0.39 km^{2} (0.15 mi^{2})
Kölpinsee	62.1 m (204 ft)	20.29 km^{2} (7.83 mi^{2})
Krummer Woklow	60.5 m (198 ft)	0.42 km^{2} (0.16 mi^{2})
Labussee	57.5 m (189 ft)	2.51 km^{2} (0.97 mi^{2})
Lake Kummerow	0.3 m (0.98 ft)	32.55 km^{2} (12.57 mi^{2})
Leppinsee	58.6 m (192 ft)	0.914 km^{2} (0.353 mi^{2})
Loppiner See	62.1 m (204 ft)	0.87 km^{2} (0.34 mi^{2})
Malliner See	39.6 m (130 ft)	0.731 km^{2} (0.282 mi^{2})
Massower See	68.9 m (226 ft)	1.133 km^{2} (0.437 mi^{2})
Melzer See	63.1 m (207 ft)	0.291 km^{2} (0.112 mi^{2})
Minzower See	74.2 m (243 ft)	0.088 km^{2} (0.034 mi^{2})
Mirower See	58.6 m (192 ft)	1.02 km^{2} (0.39 mi^{2})
Mönchteich	62.4 m (205 ft)	0.042 km^{2} (0.016 mi^{2})
Moorsee	62.5 m (205 ft)	0.164 km^{2} (0.063 mi^{2})
Mössensee	58.5 m (192 ft)	0.364 km^{2} (0.141 mi^{2})
Müritzarm	62.1 m (204 ft)	1.23 km^{2} (0.47 mi^{2})
Müritzsee	62.1 m (204 ft)	1.385 km^{2} (0.535 mi^{2})
Mürtzsee	70.7 m (232 ft)	0.252 km^{2} (0.097 mi^{2})
Peetschsee	59.1 m (194 ft)	0.33 km^{2} (0.13 mi^{2})
Plätlinsee	55.1 m (181 ft)	2.42 km^{2} (0.93 mi^{2})
Pomelsee	55.8 m (183 ft)	0.15 km^{2} (0.058 mi^{2})
Poppentiner See	77.5 m (254 ft)	0.057 km^{2} (0.022 mi^{2})
Prelitzsee	62.1 m (204 ft)	0.045 km^{2} (0.017 mi^{2})
Rätzsee	57.5 m (189 ft)	2.92 km^{2} (1.13 mi^{2})
Rederangsee	62.5 m (205 ft)	2 km^{2} (0.77 mi^{2})
Rittmannshagener See	31.9 m (105 ft)	0.482 km^{2} (0.186 mi^{2})
Rödliner See	62.8 m (206 ft)	1.97 km^{2} (0.76 mi^{2})
Roter See (bei Kakeldütt)	59.6 m (196 ft)	0.11 km^{2} (0.042 mi^{2})
Schmaler Luzin	84.3 m (277 ft)	1.29 km^{2} (0.50 mi^{2})
Schwarzer See	58.5 m (192 ft)	0.364 km^{2} (0.141 mi^{2})
Schweingartensee	72 m (236 ft)	0.747 km^{2} (0.288 mi^{2})
Specker See	62.4 m (205 ft)	2.58 km^{2} (1.00 mi^{2})
Steinfortsee	73.5 m (241 ft)	0.035 km^{2} (0.014 mi^{2})
Tangahnsee	73 m (240 ft)	0.258 km^{2} (0.100 mi^{2})
Thüren	62.1 m (204 ft)	1.72 km^{2} (0.66 mi^{2})
Tiefer Trebbower See	57.8 m (190 ft)	0.41 km^{2} (0.16 mi^{2})
Tiefer See	62.9 m (206 ft)	0.76 km^{2} (0.29 mi^{2})
Torgelower See	38.6 m (127 ft)	3.57 km^{2} (1.38 mi^{2})
Tüzer See	51.5 m (169 ft)	0.25 km^{2} (0.097 mi^{2})
Useriner See	59.4 m (195 ft)	3.6 km^{2} (1.4 mi^{2})
Wackstower See	65.2 m (214 ft)	0.036 km^{2} (0.014 mi^{2})
Wanzkaer See	58.5 m (192 ft)	2.03 km^{2} (0.78 mi^{2})
Warnker See	62.5 m (205 ft)	0.456 km^{2} (0.176 mi^{2})
Wolfskuhlsee	63.8 m (209 ft)	0.039 km^{2} (0.015 mi^{2})
Woterfitzsee	58.8 m (193 ft)	2.9 km^{2} (1.1 mi^{2})
Zethner See	58.5 m (192 ft)	0.35 km^{2} (0.14 mi^{2})
Zieskensee	46 m (151 ft)	0.172 km^{2} (0.066 mi^{2})
Zotzensee	58.5 m (192 ft)	1.32 km^{2} (0.51 mi^{2})

== See also ==
- List of lakes in Mecklenburg-Vorpommern
- Wienpietschseen
