= Drewitzer See =

Lake in Mecklenburg-Vorpommern, Germany

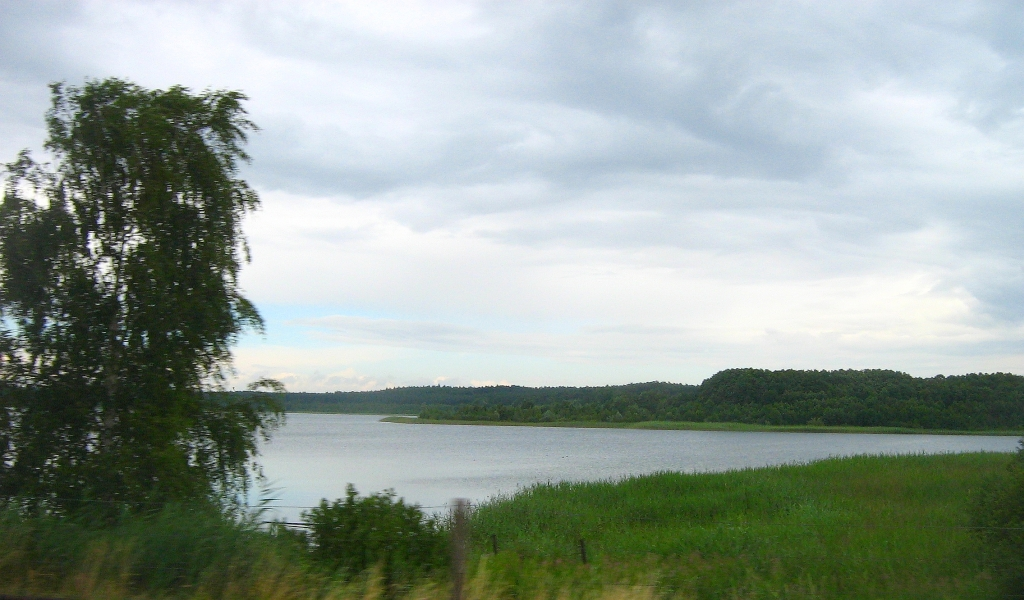

- Location within Mecklenburg-Vorpommern
- Location: Mecklenburgische Seenplatte, Mecklenburg-Vorpommern
- Coordinates: 53°32′31″N 12°21′48″E
- Primary inflows: subterrean sources
- Primary outflows: subterrean sources
- Basin countries: Germany
- Surface area: 6.92 km^{2} (2.67 sq mi)
- Average depth: 9.7 m (32 ft)
- Max. depth: 31.3 m (103 ft)
- Surface elevation: 62.4 m (205 ft)

Drewitzer See is a lake in the Mecklenburgische Seenplatte district in Mecklenburg-Vorpommern, Germany. At an elevation of 62.4 m, its surface area is 6.92 km^{2}.
