= Große Wünnow =

Lake in Mecklenburg-Vorpommern, Germany

- Location within Mecklenburg-Vorpommern
- Location: Mecklenburgische Seenplatte, Mecklenburg-Vorpommern
- Coordinates: 53°22′39″N 12°37′19″E
- Primary outflows: Müritz
- Basin countries: Germany
- Surface area: 0.28 km^{2} (0.11 sq mi)
- Surface elevation: 62.1 m (204 ft)

Große Wünnow is a small inland lake in the Mecklenburgische Seenplatte district in Mecklenburg-Vorpommern, Germany. A tributary lake of the Müritz near Röbel/Müritz, it is the continuation of Röbler inland lake, but bends from it at a right angle to the east via a narrow entrance. Situated at an elevation of 62.1 m, its surface area is 0.28 km^{2}. The maximum extent of the lake is 1200 meters by 1200 meters by 360 meters.

The Sülwerhop swamp area, which protrudes from the north into the Große Wünnow, divides the lake into two sections of unequal size, which are connected by a passage that is only around 30 meters wide. The remaining banks are occupied by fields and meadows, whose drainage ditches are the only tributaries. It is a very shallow body of water, with a maximum depth of 0.5 metres (1.6 ft) and partly silted.

There are a large number of boathouses on the south bank. the Müritz cycle path leads directly along the bank.
