= Dambecker See =

Lake in Mecklenburg-Vorpommern, Germany

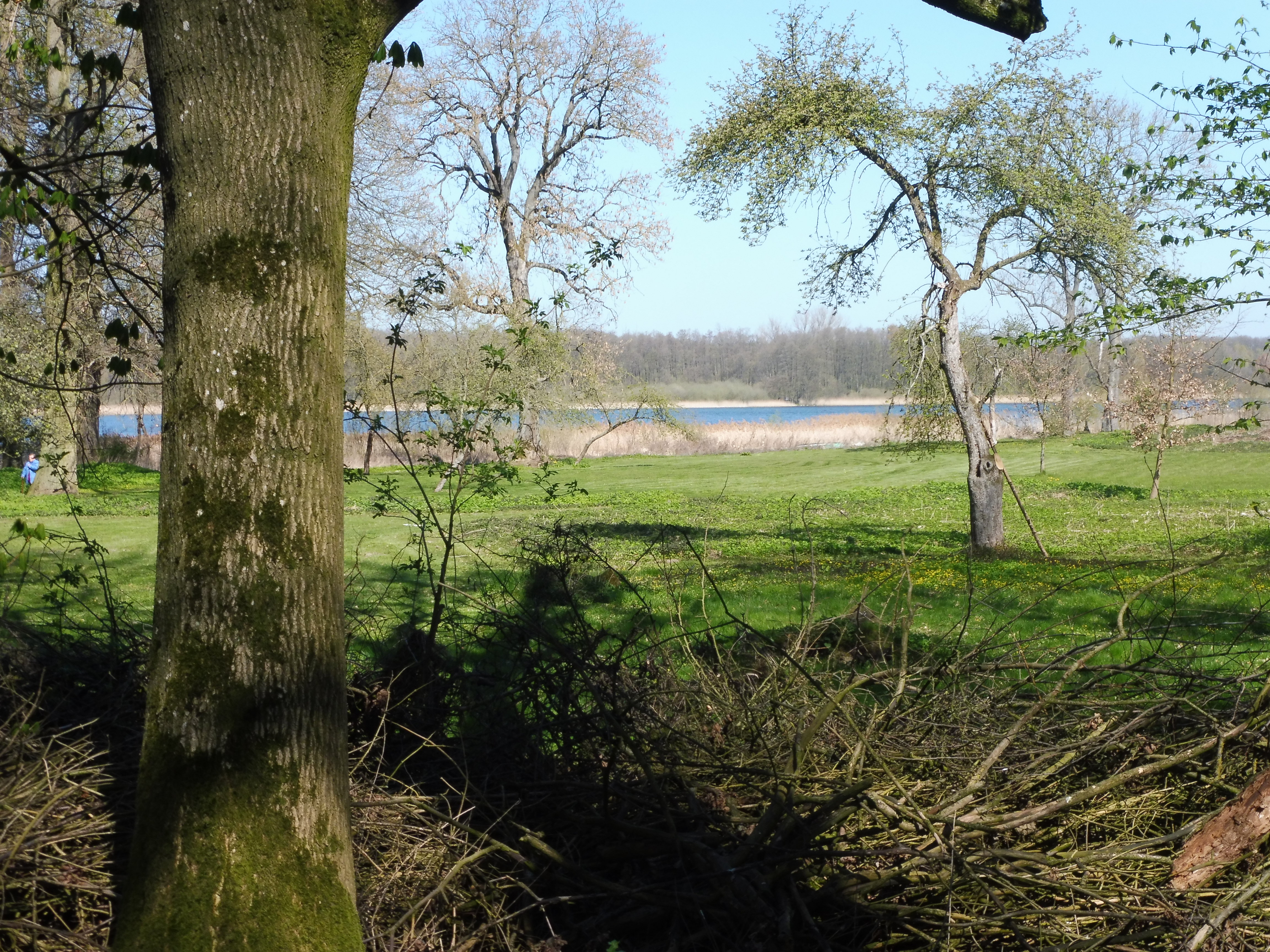

- Location within Mecklenburg-Vorpommern
- Location: Bütow, Mecklenburgische Seenplatte, Mecklenburg-Vorpommern
- Coordinates: 53°22′04″N 12°29′38″E
- Basin countries: Germany
- Surface area: 0.541 km^{2} (0.209 sq mi)
- Surface elevation: 72 m (236 ft)

Dambecker See is a lake in the Mecklenburgische Seenplatte district in Mecklenburg-Vorpommern, Germany. At an elevation of 72 m, its surface area is 0.541 km².
