= Kogeler See =

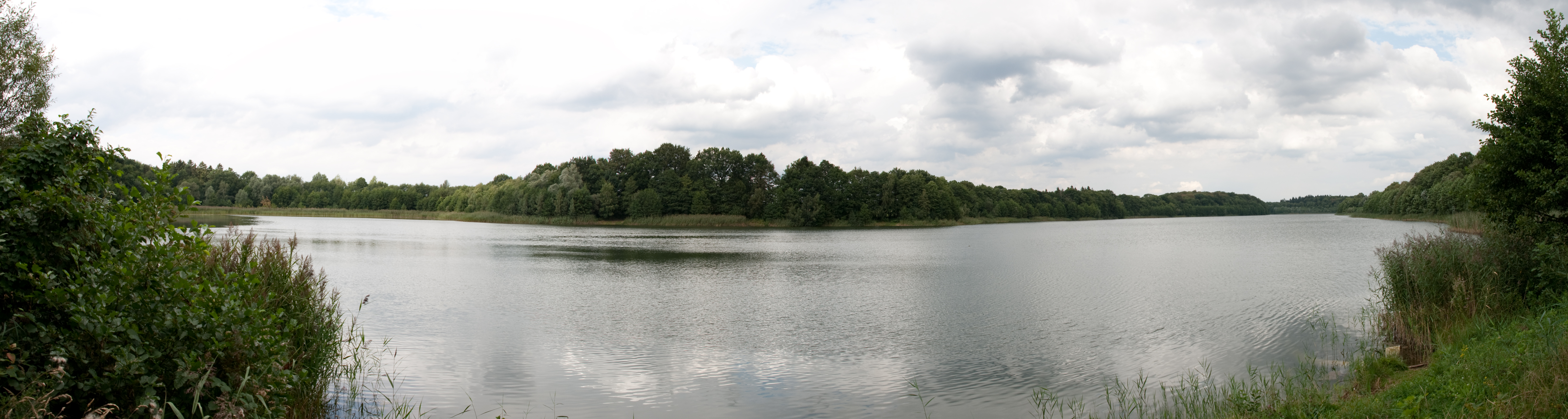
- Panorama of Lake Kogeler, photographed by the southern shore. Behind the photographer was the pumping station of the lake.

- Location within Mecklenburg-Vorpommern
- Location: Mecklenburgische Seenplatte, Mecklenburg-Vorpommern
- Coordinates: 53.411618°N 12.409767°E
- Type: natural freshwater lake
- Basin countries: Germany
- Max. length: 1.74 km (1.08 mi)
- Max. width: 0.29 km (0.18 mi)
- Surface area: 0.39 km^{2} (0.15 mi^{2})
- Max. depth: 13 m (43 ft)
- Surface elevation: 90.8 m (298 ft)
- Settlements: village of Kogel

Kogeler See is a lake in the Mecklenburgische Seenplatte district in Mecklenburg-Vorpommern, Germany. At an elevation of 90.8 m, its surface area is 0.39 km^{2}.
