= Zethner See =

Lake in Mecklenburg-Vorpommern, Germany

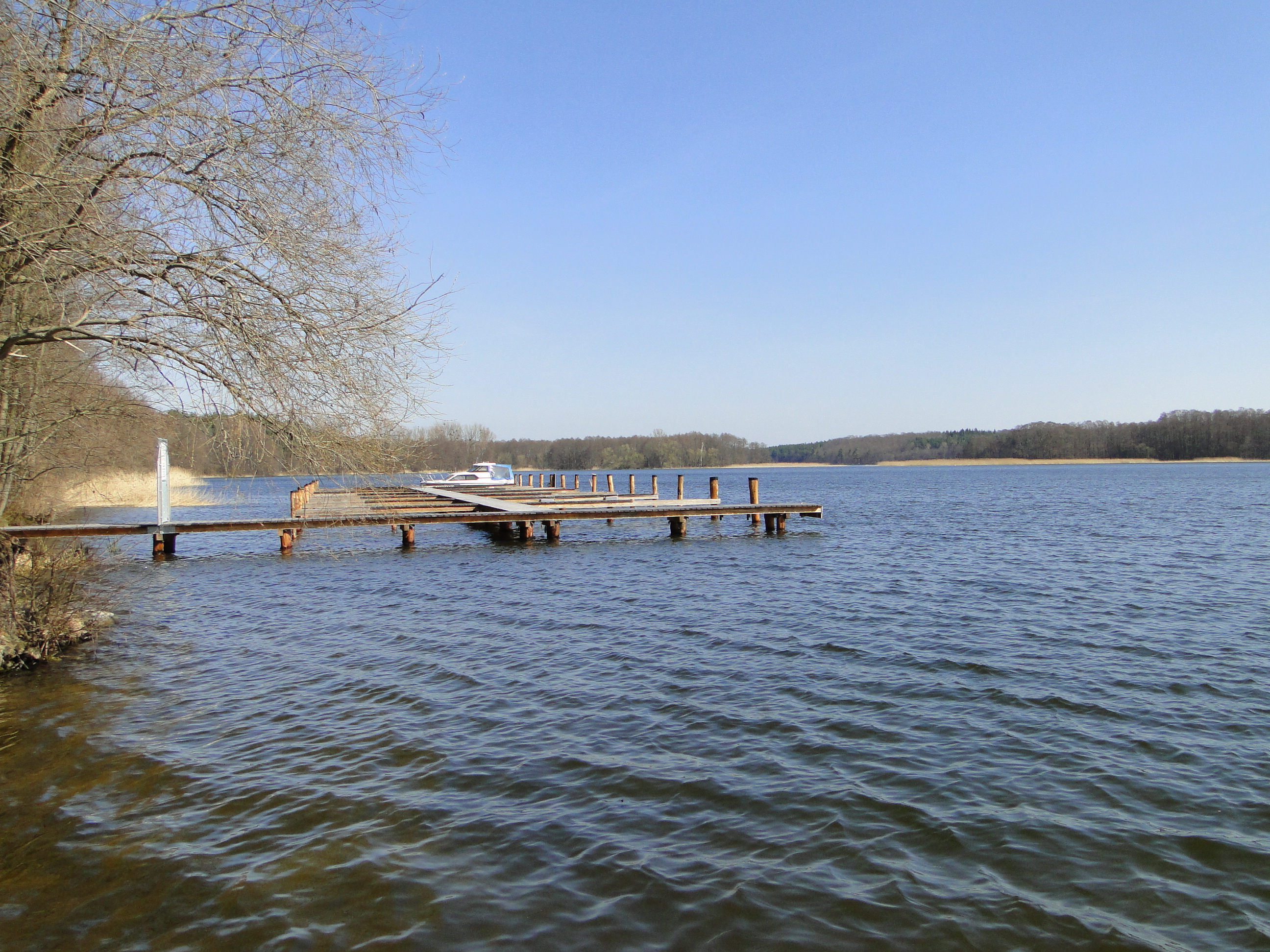
- Lake Zethner See in Schwarz, district Müritz, Mecklenburg-Vorpommern, Germany

- Location within Germany
- Location: Mecklenburgische Seenplatte, Mecklenburg-Vorpommern
- Coordinates: 53.20922°N 12.793064°E
- Basin countries: Germany
- Surface area: 35 ha (86 acres)
- Surface elevation: 58.5 m (192 ft)

Zethner See is a lake in the Mecklenburgische Seenplatte district in Mecklenburg-Vorpommern, Germany. At an elevation of 58.5 m, its surface area is 0.35 km^{2}.
