= Prelitzsee =

Lake in Germany

- Location within Mecklenburg-Vorpommern
- Location: Mecklenburgische Seenplatte, Mecklenburg-Vorpommern
- Coordinates: 53°21′58″N 12°45′55″E
- Basin countries: Germany
- Surface area: 0.045 km^{2} (0.017 sq mi)
- Surface elevation: 62.1 m (204 ft)

Prelitzsee is a lake in the Mecklenburgische Seenplatte district in Mecklenburg-Vorpommern, Germany. At an elevation of 62.1 m, its surface area is 0.045 km^{2}.
