= Drewensee =

Lake in Mecklenburg-Vorpommern, Germany

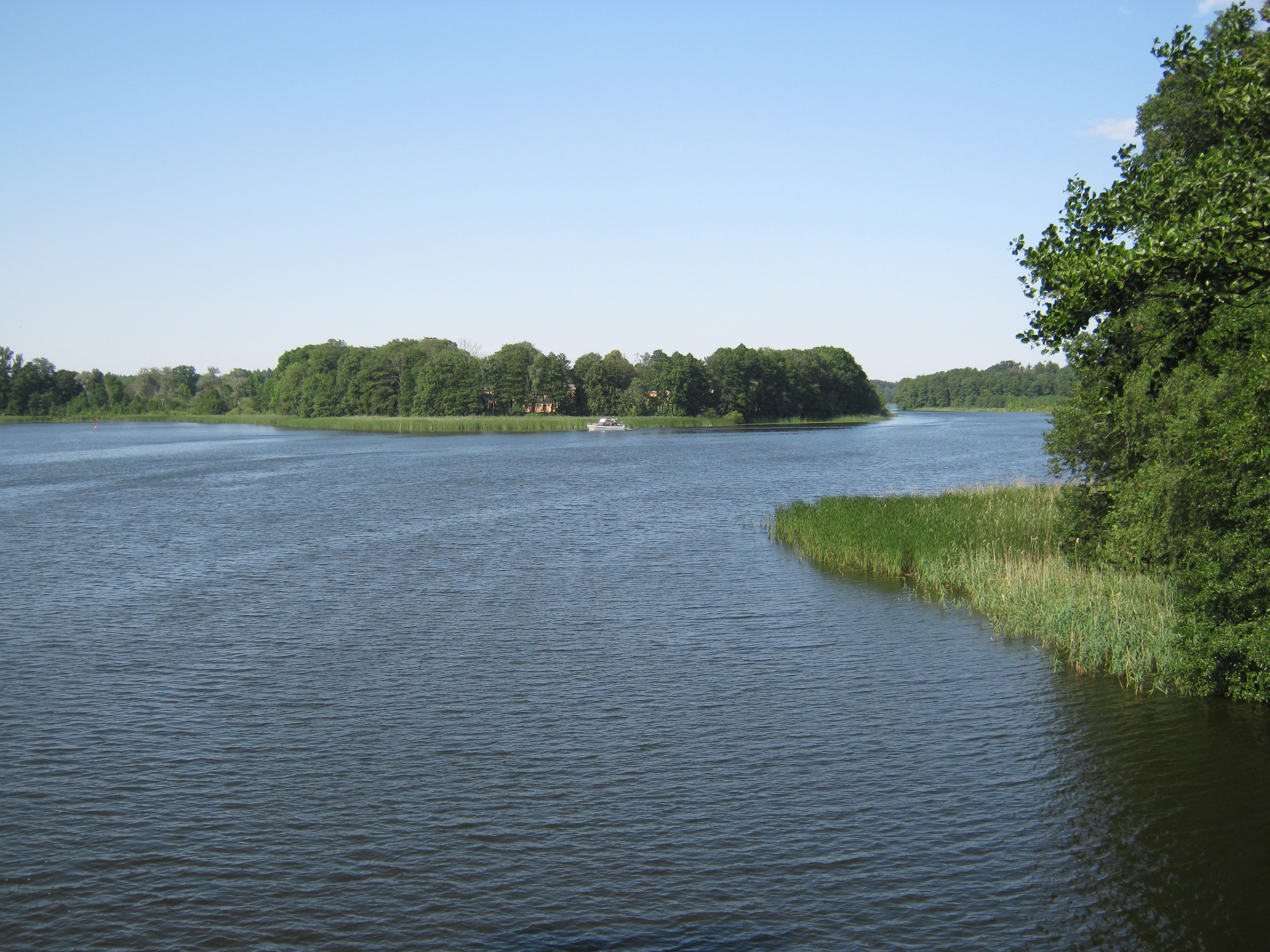

- Location within Mecklenburg-Vorpommern
- Location: Mecklenburgische Seenplatte, Mecklenburg-Vorpommern, Germany
- Coordinates: 53.25681°N 13.06199°E
- Primary inflows: Obere–Havel–Wasserstraße
- Primary outflows: Havel
- Basin countries: Germany
- Surface area: 2.56 km^{2} (0.99 sq mi)
- Max. depth: 9 m (30 ft)
- Surface elevation: 54.9 m (180 ft)

Drewensee is a lake in the Mecklenburgische Seenplatte district in Mecklenburg-Vorpommern, Germany. It has an elevation of 54.9 m (180 ft) and surface area of 2.56 km (1.59 mi).
