= Poppentiner See =

Lake in Germany

- Location within Mecklenburg-Vorpommern
- Location: Mecklenburgische Seenplatte, Mecklenburg-Vorpommern
- Coordinates: 53°27′49″N 12°31′46″E
- Basin countries: Germany
- Surface area: 0.057 km^{2} (0.022 sq mi)
- Surface elevation: 77.5 m (254 ft)

Poppentiner See is a lake in the Mecklenburgische Seenplatte district in Mecklenburg-Vorpommern, Germany. At an elevation of 77.5 m, its surface area is 0.057 km^{2}.
