= Roter See (bei Kakeldütt) =

Lake in Mecklenburg-Vorpommern, Germany

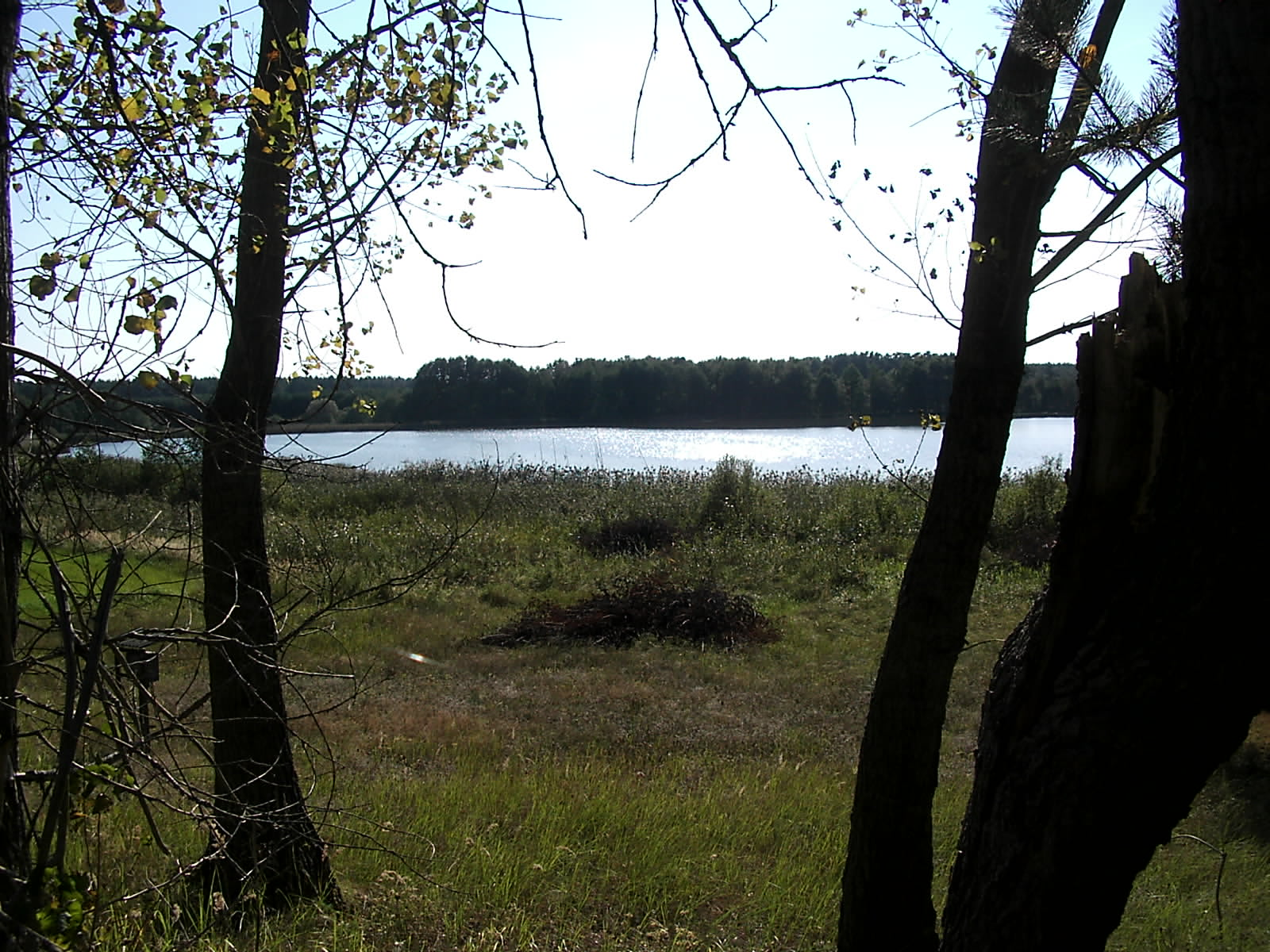

- Location within Mecklenburg-Vorpommern
- Location: Mecklenburgische Seenplatte, Mecklenburgische Seenplatte, Mecklenburg-Vorpommern
- Coordinates: 53°20′31″N 12°55′20″E
- Basin countries: Germany
- Surface area: 0.11 km^{2} (0.042 sq mi)
- Surface elevation: 59.6 m (196 ft)

Roter See (bei Kakeldütt) is a lake in Mecklenburgische Seenplatte, Mecklenburgische Seenplatte, Mecklenburg-Vorpommern, Germany. At an elevation of 59.6 m, its surface area is 0.11 km^{2}.
