= Plätlinsee =

Lake in Germany

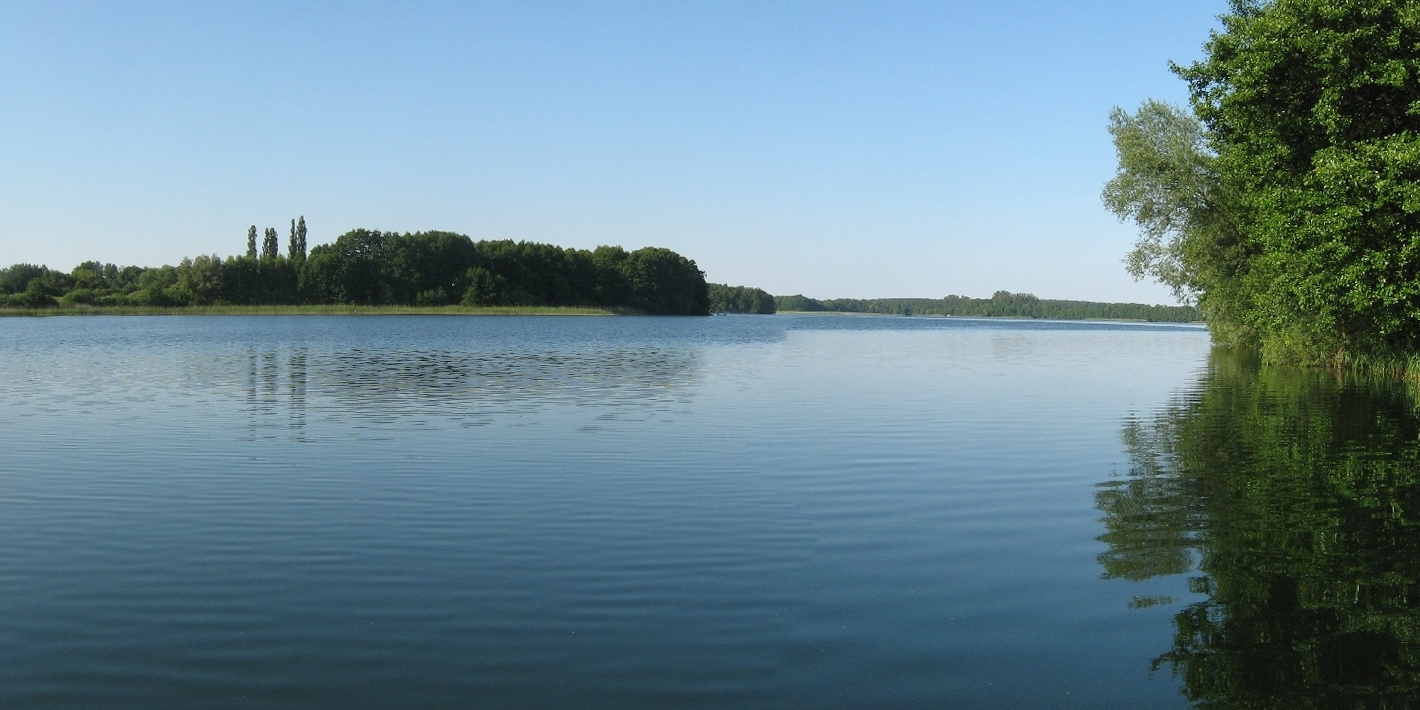

- Location within Mecklenburg-Vorpommern
- Location: Mecklenburgische Seenplatte, Mecklenburg-Vorpommern
- Coordinates: 53°13′54.22271″N 12°59′18.91113″E
- Primary inflows: Reeksgraben
- Primary outflows: Schwaanhavel
- Basin countries: Germany
- Surface area: 2.42 km^{2} (0.93 sq mi)
- Surface elevation: 55.1 m (181 ft)

Plätlinsee is a lake in the Mecklenburgische Seenplatte district in Mecklenburg-Vorpommern, Germany. At an elevation of 55.1 m, its surface area is 2.42 km^{2}.
