= Dolgener See =

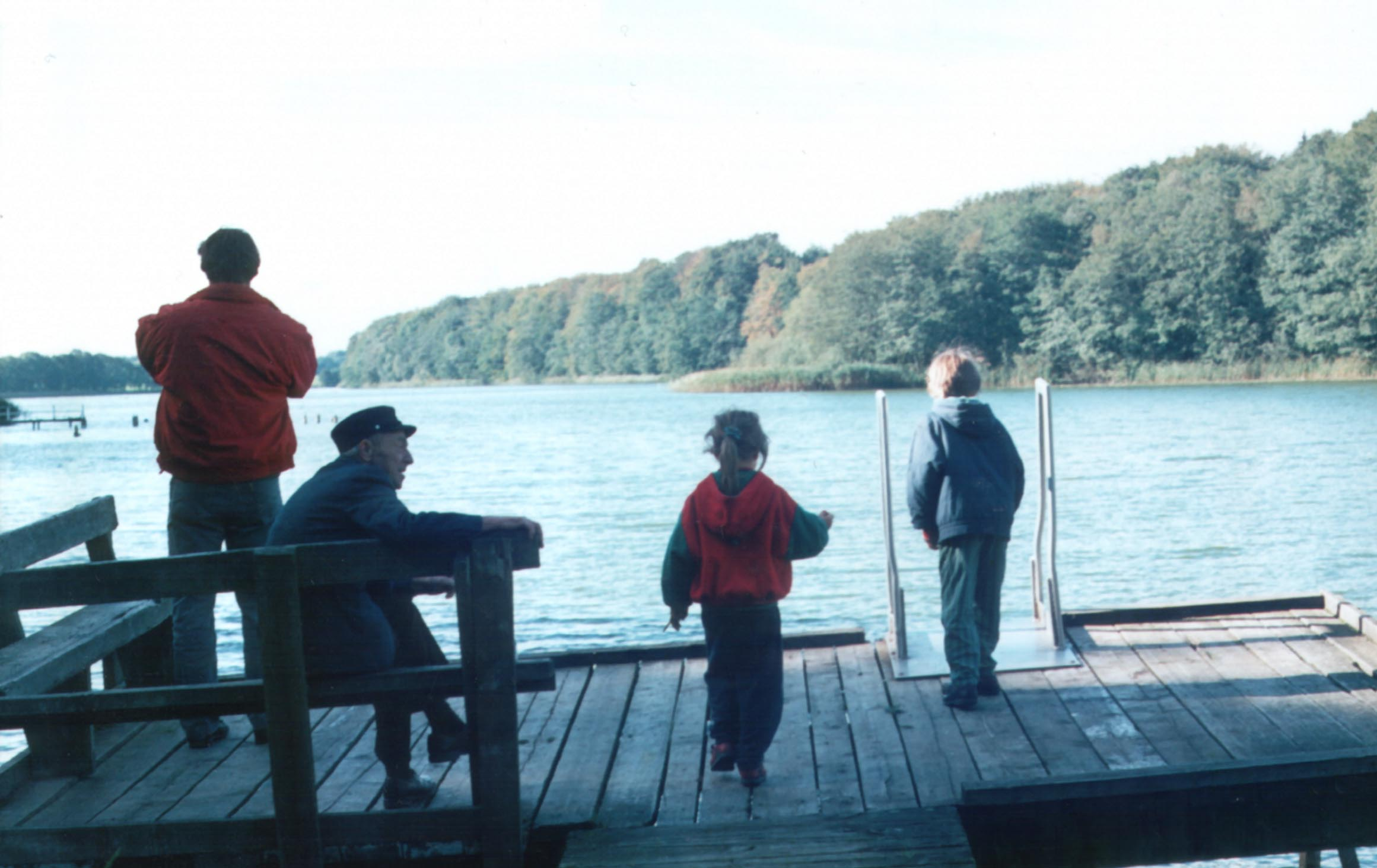

- Location within Mecklenburg-Vorpommern
- Location: Mecklenburgische Seenplatte, Mecklenburg-Vorpommern
- Coordinates: 53°20′22.88″N 13°21′20.77″E
- Basin countries: Germany
- Surface area: 69 ha (170 acres)
- Max. depth: 44 ft (13 m)
- Surface elevation: 97.8 m (321 ft)

Dolgener See is a lake in the Mecklenburgische Seenplatte district in Mecklenburg-Vorpommern, Germany. At an elevation of 97.8 m, its surface area is 0.69 km^{2}.
