= Zotzensee =

Lake in Mecklenburg-Vorpommern, Germany

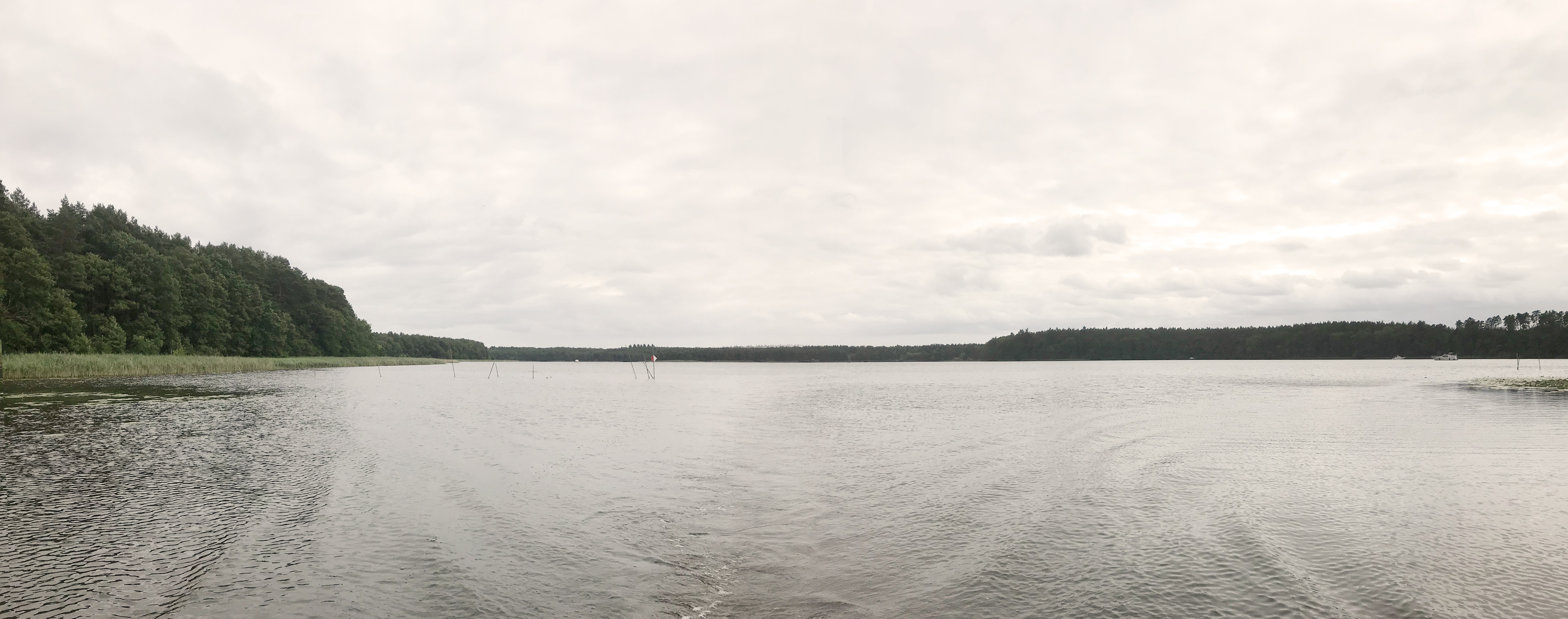

- Location within Germany
- Location: Mecklenburgische Seenplatte, Mecklenburg-Vorpommern
- Coordinates: 53.242414°N 12.812634°E
- Primary inflows: Müritz–Havel–Wasserstraße
- Basin countries: Germany
- Surface area: 1.32 km^{2} (0.51 sq mi)
- Surface elevation: 58.5 m (192 ft)

Zotzensee is a lake in the Mecklenburgische Seenplatte district in Mecklenburg-Vorpommern, Germany. At an elevation of 58.5 m, its surface area is 1.32 km^{2}.
