= Besenreepsee =

Lake in Mecklenburgische Seenplatte District, Mecklenburg-Vorpommern, Germany

- Location within Mecklenburg-Vorpommern
- Location: Mecklenburgische Seenplatte, Mecklenburg-Vorpommern
- Coordinates: 53.25305°N 13.11029°E
- Basin countries: Germany
- Surface area: 0.084 km^{2} (0.032 sq mi)
- Surface elevation: 57 m (187 ft)

Besenreepsee is a lake in the Mecklenburgische Seenplatte district in Mecklenburg-Vorpommern, Germany. At an elevation of 57 m, its surface area is 0.084 km^{2}.
