= Buchsee =

Lake in Germany

- Location within Mecklenburg-Vorpommern
- Location: Mecklenburgische Seenplatte, Mecklenburg-Vorpommern
- Coordinates: 53.21203°N 12.96106°E
- Basin countries: Germany
- Surface area: 0.089 km^{2} (0.034 sq mi)
- Max. depth: 5 m (16 ft)
- Surface elevation: 58.9 m (193 ft)

Buchsee is a lake in the Mecklenburgische Seenplatte district in Mecklenburg-Vorpommern, Germany. At an elevation of 58.9 m, its surface area is 0.089 km^{2}.
