= Kleiner Weißer See =

Lake in Germany

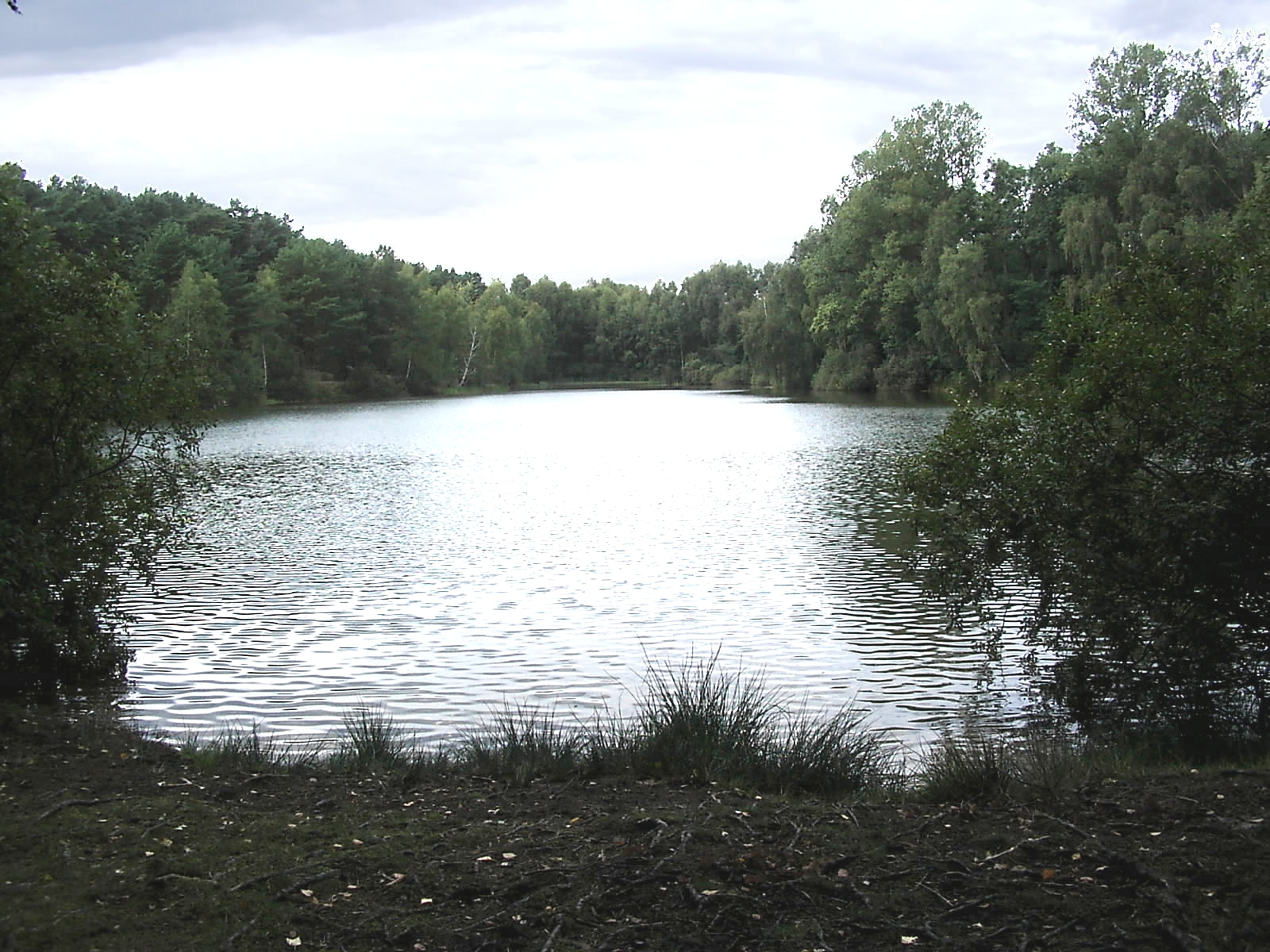

- Location within Mecklenburg-Vorpommern
- Location: Mecklenburgische Seenplatte, Mecklenburgische Seenplatte, Mecklenburg-Vorpommern
- Coordinates: 53°16′55″N 12°57′00″E
- Basin countries: Germany
- Surface area: 0.02 km^{2} (0.0077 sq mi)
- Surface elevation: 59 m (194 ft)

Kleiner Weißer See is a lake in Mecklenburgische Seenplatte, Mecklenburgische Seenplatte, Mecklenburg-Vorpommern, Germany. At an elevation of 59 m, its surface area is 0.02 km^{2}.
