= Bergsee (Mecklenburg) =

Lake in Mecklenburg-Vorpommern, Germany

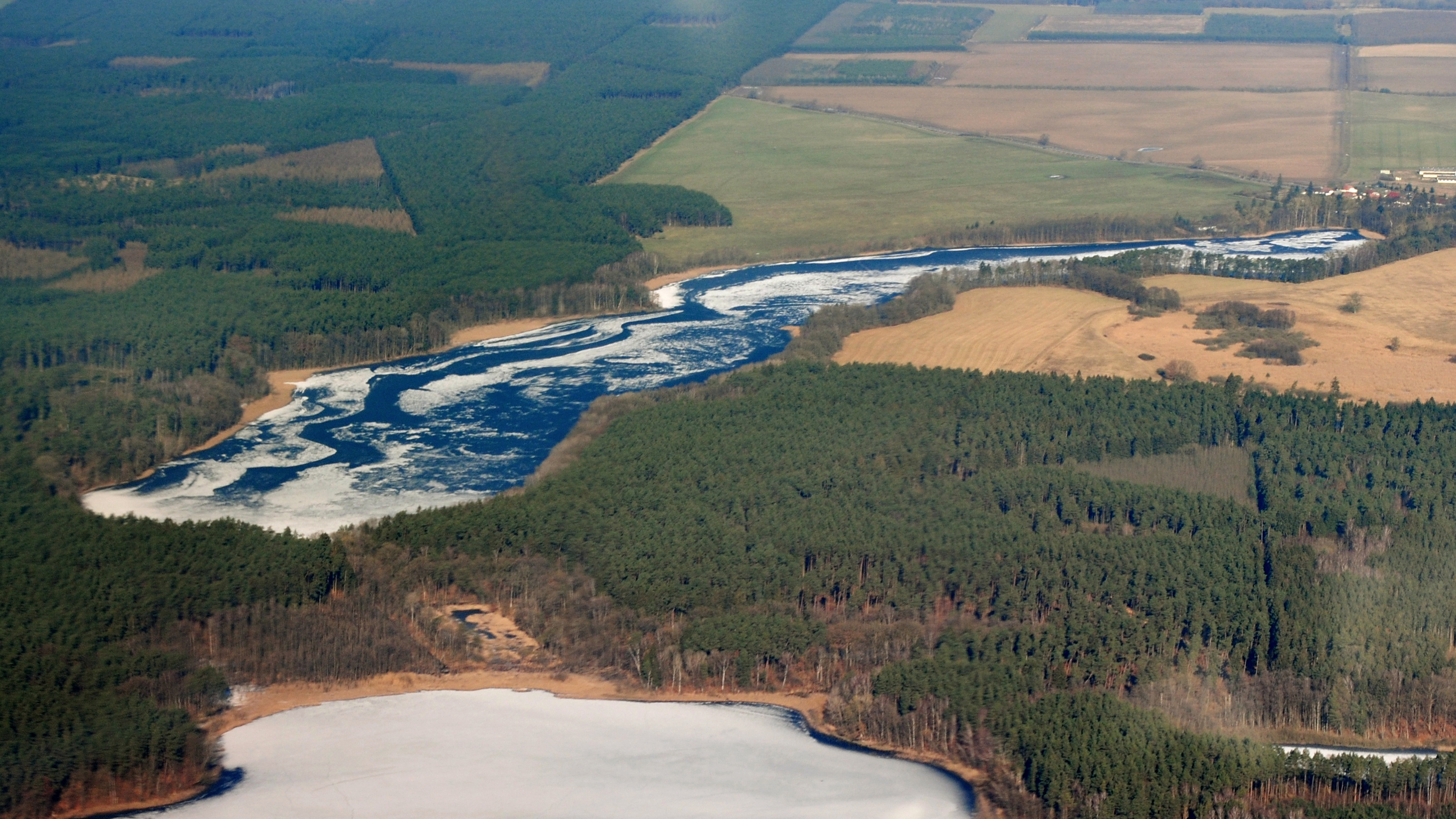
- Bergsee (Neu Gaarz)

- Location within Mecklenburg-Vorpommern
- Location: Mecklenburgische Seenplatte, Mecklenburg-Vorpommern
- Coordinates: 53°34′20″N 12°29′41″E
- Basin countries: Germany
- Surface area: 0.55 km^{2} (0.21 sq mi)
- Average depth: 6.4 m (21 ft)
- Max. depth: 15 m (49 ft)
- Surface elevation: 62.8 m (206 ft)

Bergsee is a lake in the Mecklenburgische Seenplatte district in Mecklenburg-Vorpommern, Germany. At an elevation of 62.8 m, its surface area is 0.55 km^{2}.
