= Warnker See =

Lake in Mecklenburg-Vorpommern, Germany

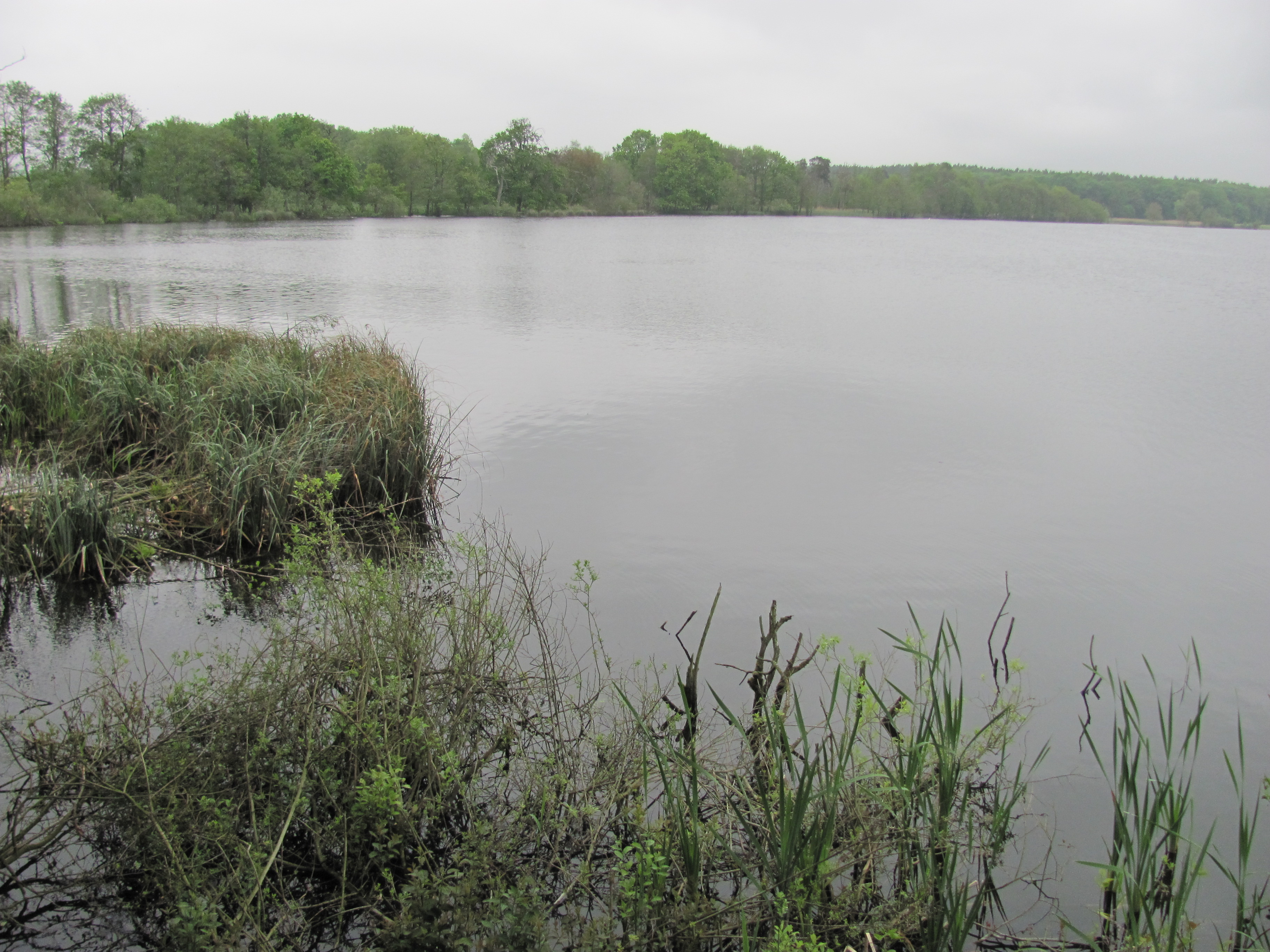

- Location within Mecklenburg-Vorpommern
- Location: Mecklenburgische Seenplatte, Mecklenburg-Vorpommern, Germany
- Coordinates: 53°28′05″N 12°42′48″E
- Basin countries: Germany
- Surface area: 0.456 km^{2} (0.176 sq mi)

Warnker See is a lake in the Mecklenburgische Seenplatte district in Mecklenburg-Vorpommern, Germany.
