= Dabelowsee =

Lake in Mecklenburg-Vorpommern, Germany

- Location within Mecklenburg-Vorpommern
- Location: Mecklenburgische Seenplatte, Mecklenburg-Vorpommern
- Coordinates: 53°15′24″N 13°12′23″E
- Primary outflows: Mühlenfließ
- Basin countries: Germany
- Surface area: 1.01 km^{2} (0.39 sq mi)
- Average depth: 6.6 m (22 ft)
- Max. depth: 30.5 m (100 ft)
- Surface elevation: 59.9 m (197 ft)

Dabelowsee is a lake in the Mecklenburgische Seenplatte district in Mecklenburg-Vorpommern, Germany. At an elevation of 59.9 m, its surface area is 1.01 km^{2}.
