= Wolfskuhlsee =

Lake in Mecklenburg-Vorpommern, Germany

- Location within Mecklenburg-Vorpommern
- Location: Mecklenburgische Seenplatte, Mecklenburg-Vorpommern
- Coordinates: 53°29′24″N 12°44′14″E
- Basin countries: Germany
- Surface area: 0.039 km^{2} (0.015 sq mi)
- Surface elevation: 63.8 m (209 ft)

Wolfskuhlsee is a lake in the Mecklenburgische Seenplatte district in Mecklenburg-Vorpommern, Germany. At an elevation of 63.8 m, its surface area is 0.039 km^{2}.
