= Canower See =

Lake in Mecklenburg-Vorpommern, Germany

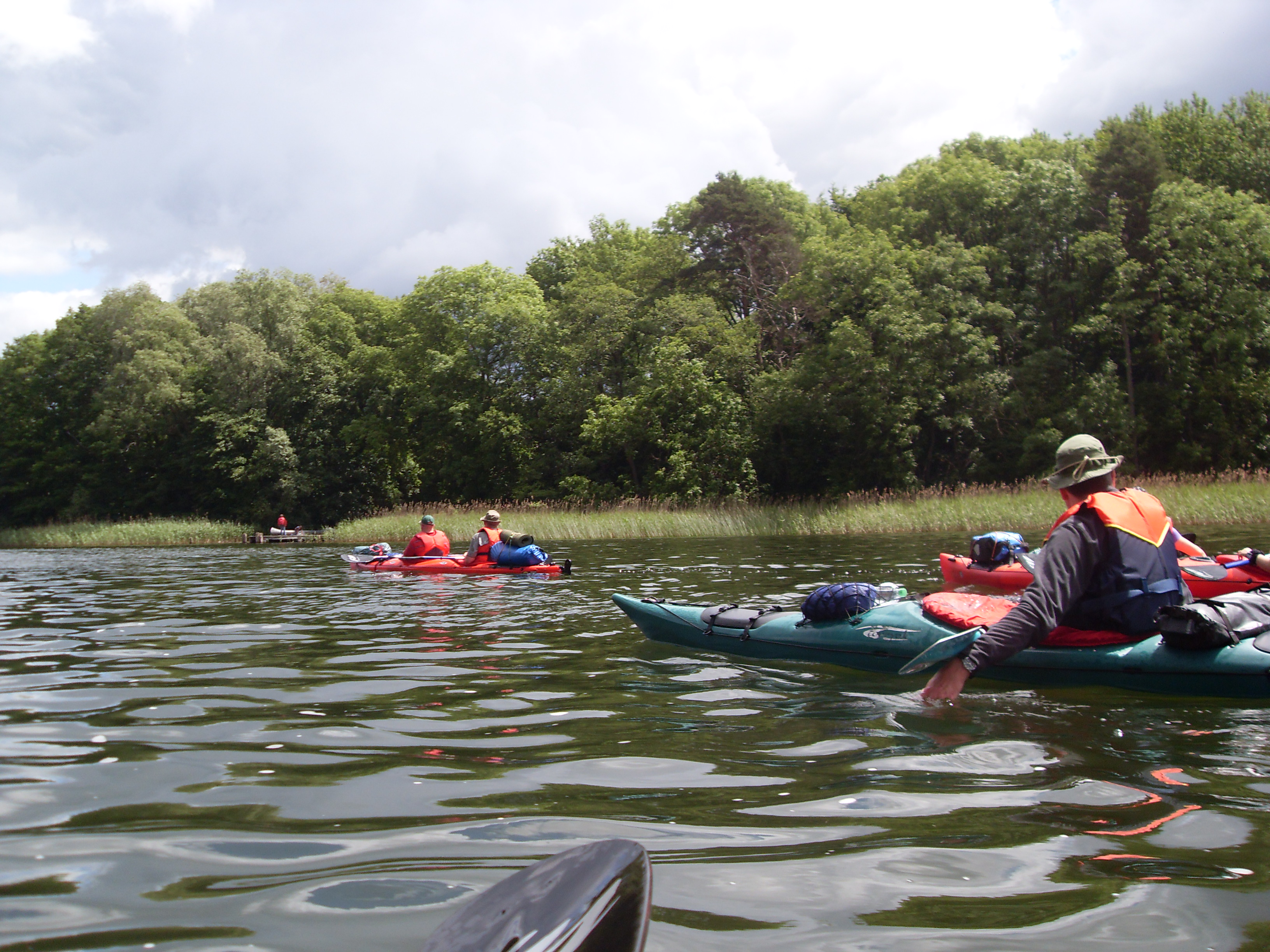
- Canower See, one of the many Lakes of Mecklenburg District

- Location within Mecklenburg-Vorpommern
- Location: Mecklenburgische Seenplatte, Mecklenburg-Vorpommern
- Coordinates: 53°11′50.99″N 12°54′43.29″E
- Primary inflows: Müritz–Havel–Wasserstraße
- Primary outflows: Müritz–Havel–Wasserstraße
- Basin countries: Germany
- Surface area: 0.5 km^{2} (0.19 mi^{2})
- Surface elevation: 56.1 m (184 ft)

Canower See is a lake in the Mecklenburgische Seenplatte district in Mecklenburg-Vorpommern, Germany. At an elevation of 56.1 metres (184 ft), its surface area is 0.5 square kilometres (0.19 mi^{2}).
