= Massower See =

Lake in Mecklenburg-Vorpommern, Germany

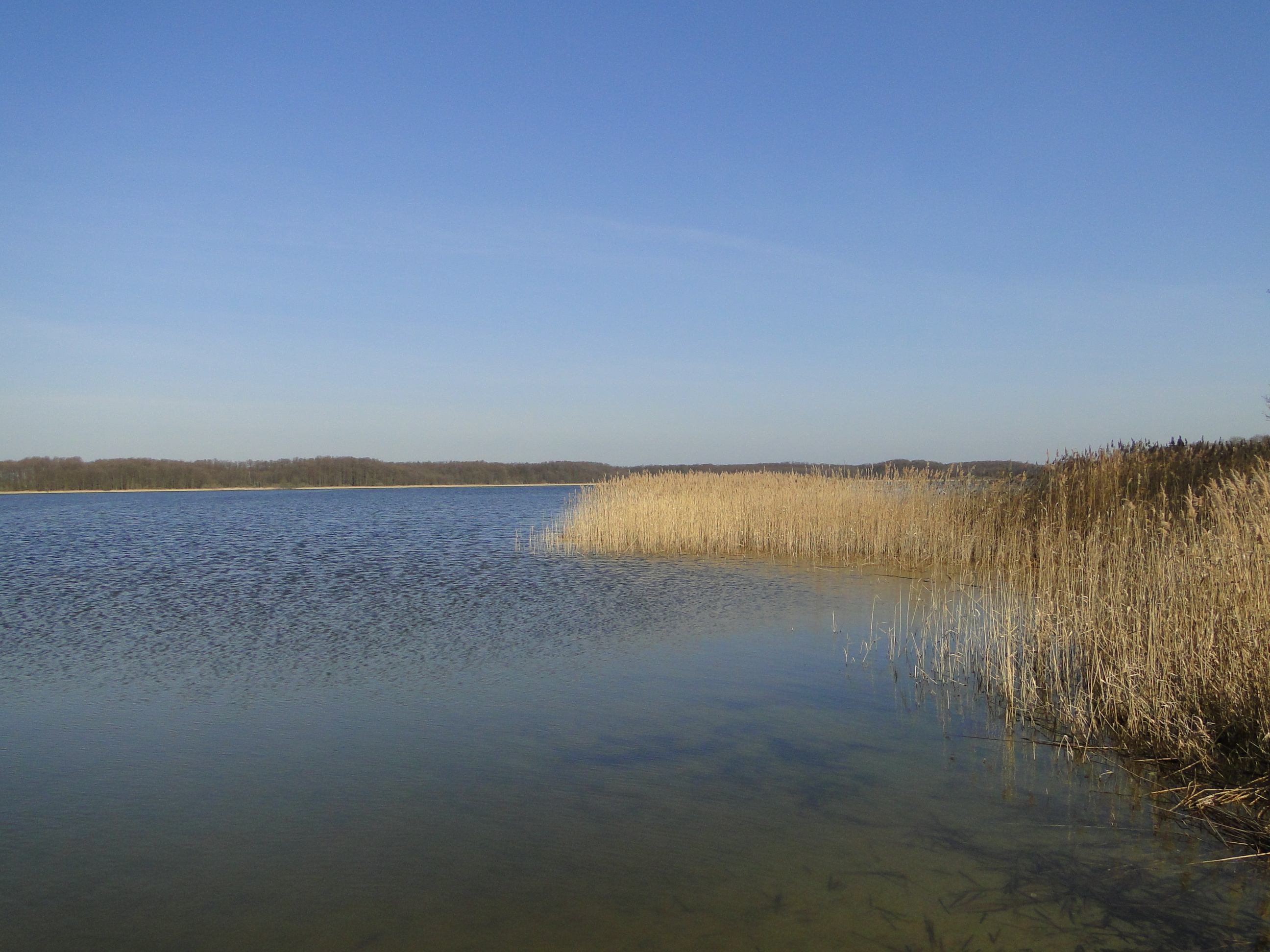
- Massower See

- Location within Mecklenburg-Vorpommern
- Location: Mecklenburgische Seenplatte, Mecklenburg-Vorpommern
- Coordinates: 53°19′22″N 12°26′32″E
- Primary inflows: Elde
- Primary outflows: Neuer Graben (Elde)
- Basin countries: Germany
- Surface area: 1.133 km^{2} (0.437 sq mi)
- Surface elevation: 68.9 m (226 ft)

Massower See is a lake in the Mecklenburgische Seenplatte district in Mecklenburg-Vorpommern, Germany. At an elevation of 68.9 m, its surface area is 1.133 km².
