= Mönchteich =

Lake in Mecklenburg-Vorpommern, Germany

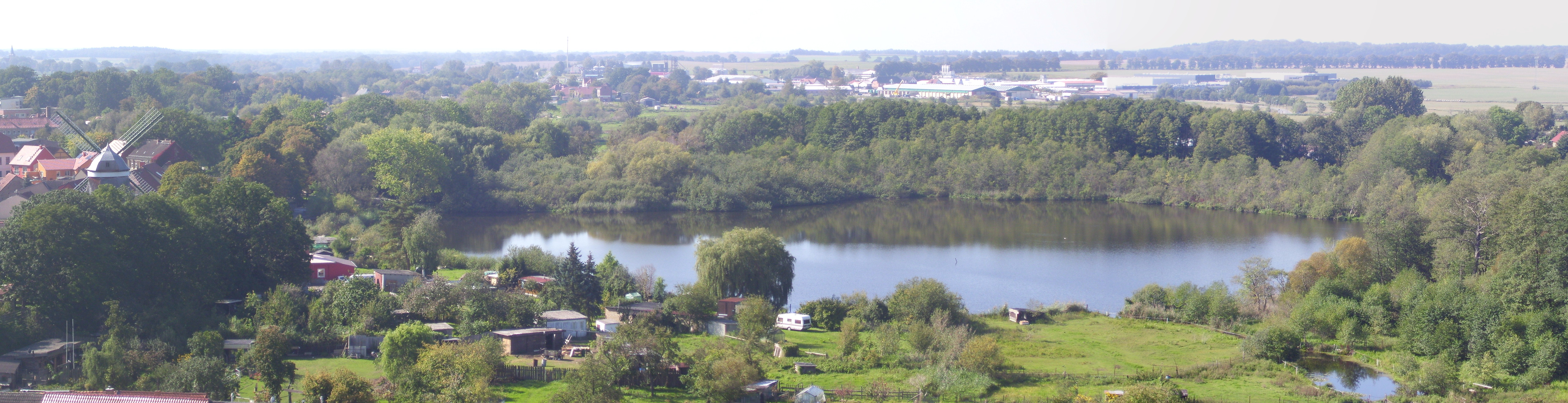
- The lake seen from nearby St Mary's Church

- Location within Mecklenburg-Vorpommern
- Location: Mecklenburgische Seenplatte, Mecklenburg-Vorpommern
- Coordinates: 53°22′49″N 12°36′21″E
- Basin countries: Germany
- Surface area: 4.2 ha (10 acres)
- Surface elevation: 62.4 m (205 ft)

Mönchteich is a lake in the Mecklenburgische Seenplatte district in Mecklenburg-Vorpommern, Germany. At an elevation of 62.4 m, its surface area is 0.042 km².
