= Mössensee =

Lake in Germany

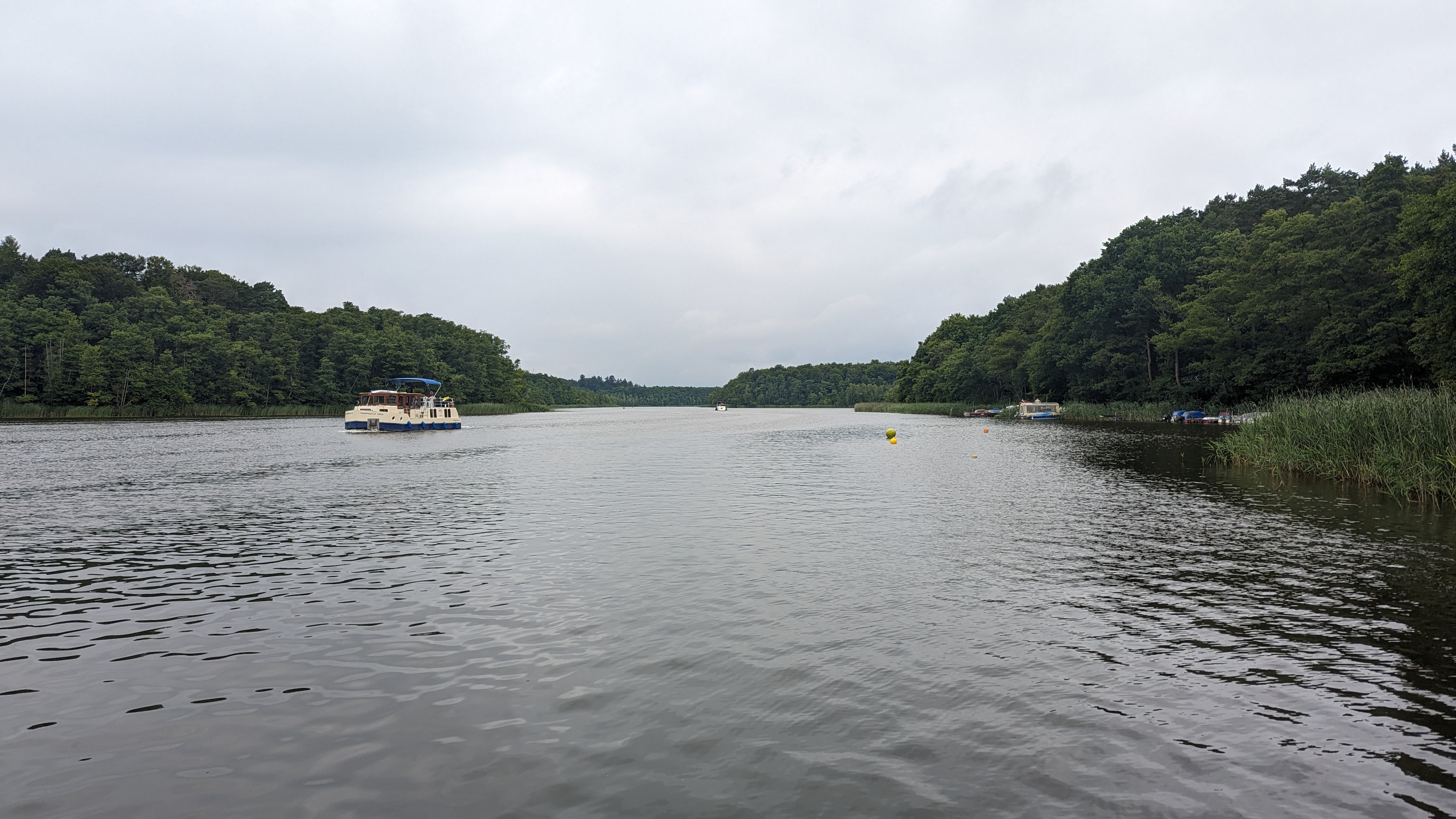

- Location within Mecklenburg-Vorpommern
- Location: Mecklenburgische Seenplatte, Mecklenburg-Vorpommern
- Coordinates: 53.226488°N 12.830143°E
- Basin countries: Germany
- Surface area: 0.364 km^{2} (0.141 mi^{2})
- Surface elevation: 58.5 m (192 ft)

Mössensee is a lake in the Mecklenburgische Seenplatte district in Mecklenburg-Vorpommern, Germany. At an elevation of 58.5 metres (192 ft), its surface area is 0.364 square kilometres (0.141 mi^{2}).
