= Rödliner See =

Lake in Mecklenburg-Vorpommern, Germany

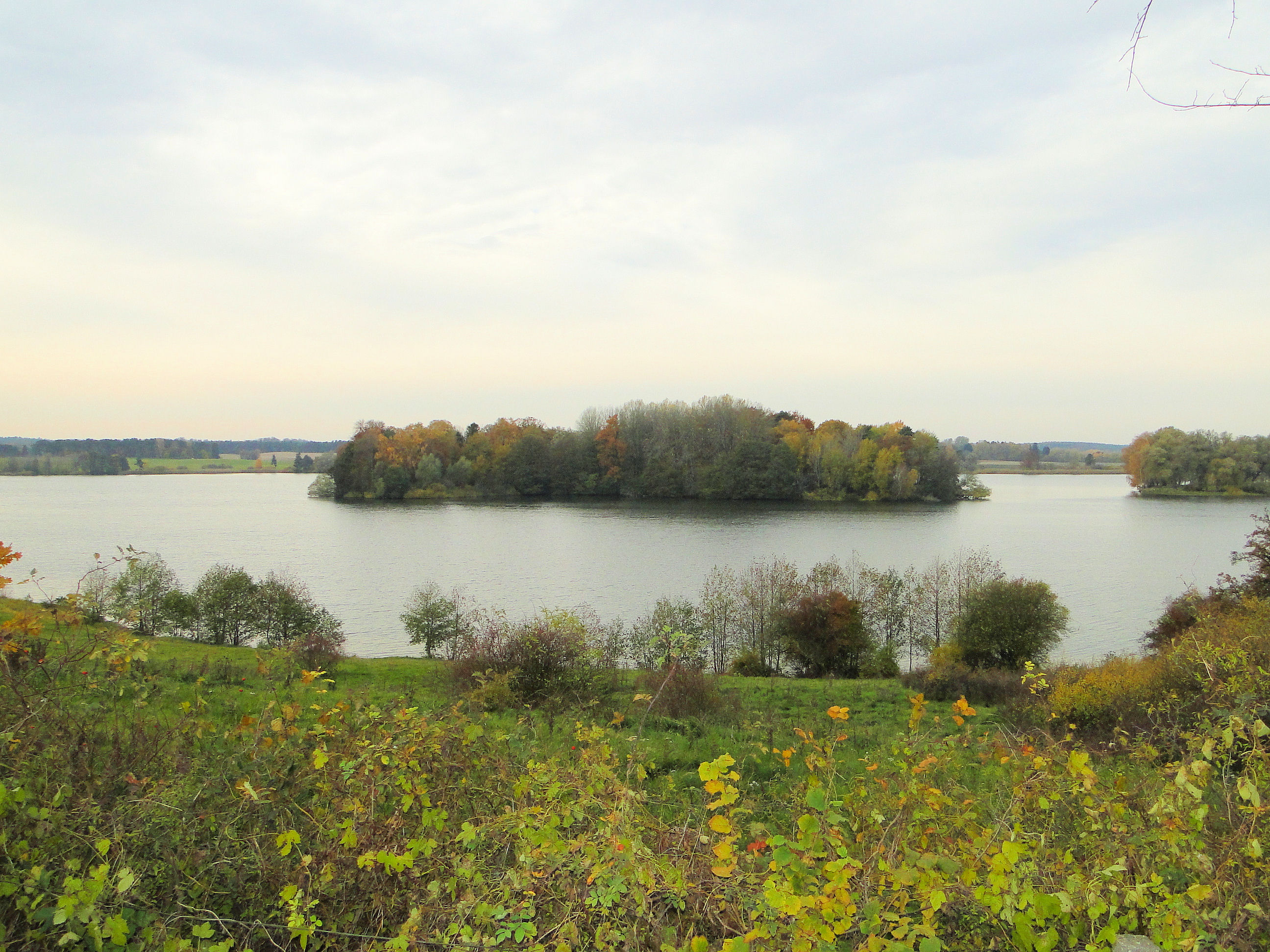

- Location within Mecklenburg-Vorpommern
- Location: Mecklenburgische Seenplatte, Mecklenburg-Vorpommern
- Coordinates: 53°22′41″N 13°15′1″E
- Primary outflows: Nonnenbach
- Basin countries: Germany
- Surface area: 1.97 km^{2} (0.76 sq mi)
- Surface elevation: 62.8 m (206 ft)

Rödliner See is a lake in the Mecklenburgische Seenplatte district in Mecklenburg-Vorpommern, Germany. At an elevation of 62.8 m, its surface area is 1.97 km^{2}.
