= Claassee =

Lake in Mecklenburg-Vorpommern, Germany

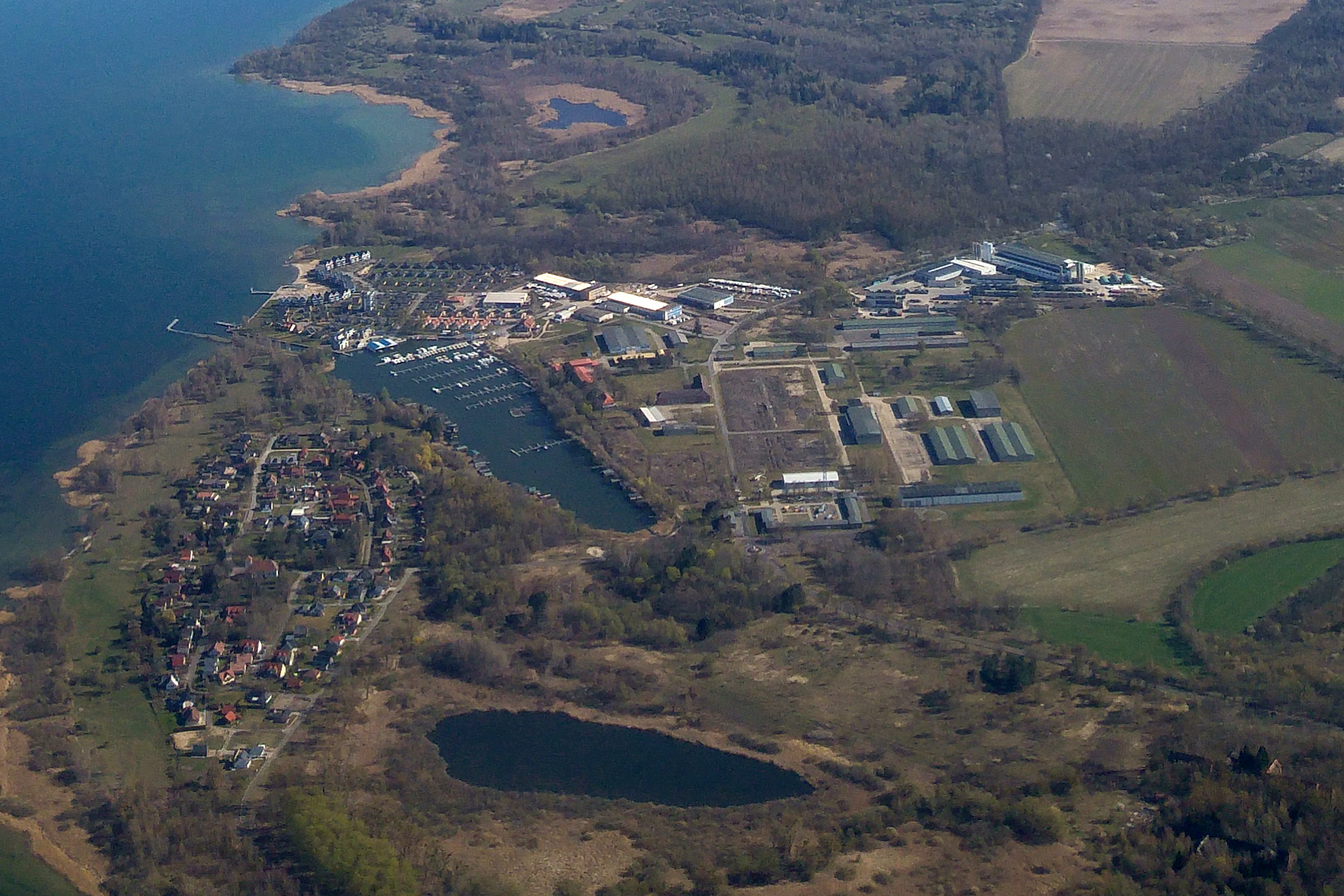
- Areal View of Claassee Showing the Abuting Buildings

- Location within Mecklenburg-Vorpommern
- Location: Mecklenburgische Seenplatte, Mecklenburg-Vorpommern
- Coordinates: 53.35397°N 12.72675°E
- Basin countries: Germany
- Max. length: 740 metres (2,430 ft)
- Max. width: 225 metres (738 ft)
- Surface area: 0.106 km^{2} (0.041 sq mi)
- Surface elevation: 62.1 m (204 ft)

Claassee is a lake in the Mecklenburgische Seenplatte district in Mecklenburg-Vorpommern, Germany. At an elevation of 62.1 m, its surface area is 0.106 km^{2}.
