= Klenzsee =

Lake in Germany

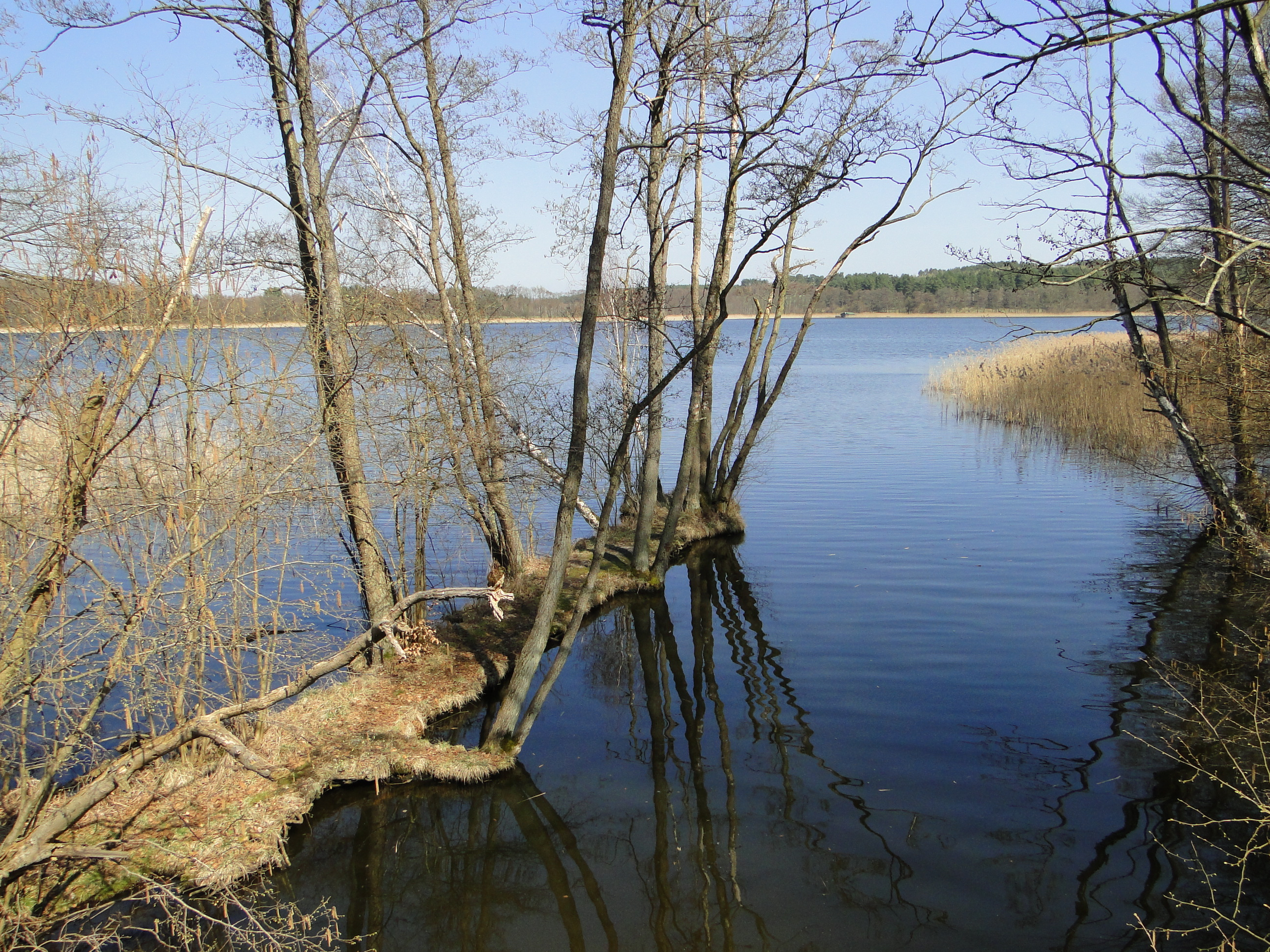
- Klenzsee near Seewalde

- Location within Mecklenburg-Vorpommern
- Location: Mecklenburgische Seenplatte, Mecklenburg-Vorpommern
- Coordinates: 53°13′36.1″N 12°57′4.81″E
- Basin countries: Germany
- Surface area: 0.74 km^{2} (0.29 sq mi)
- Surface elevation: 57.5 m (189 ft)

Klenzsee is a lake in the Mecklenburgische Seenplatte district in Mecklenburg-Vorpommern, Germany. At an elevation of 57.5 m, its surface area is 0.74 km².
