= Leppinsee =

Lake in Germany

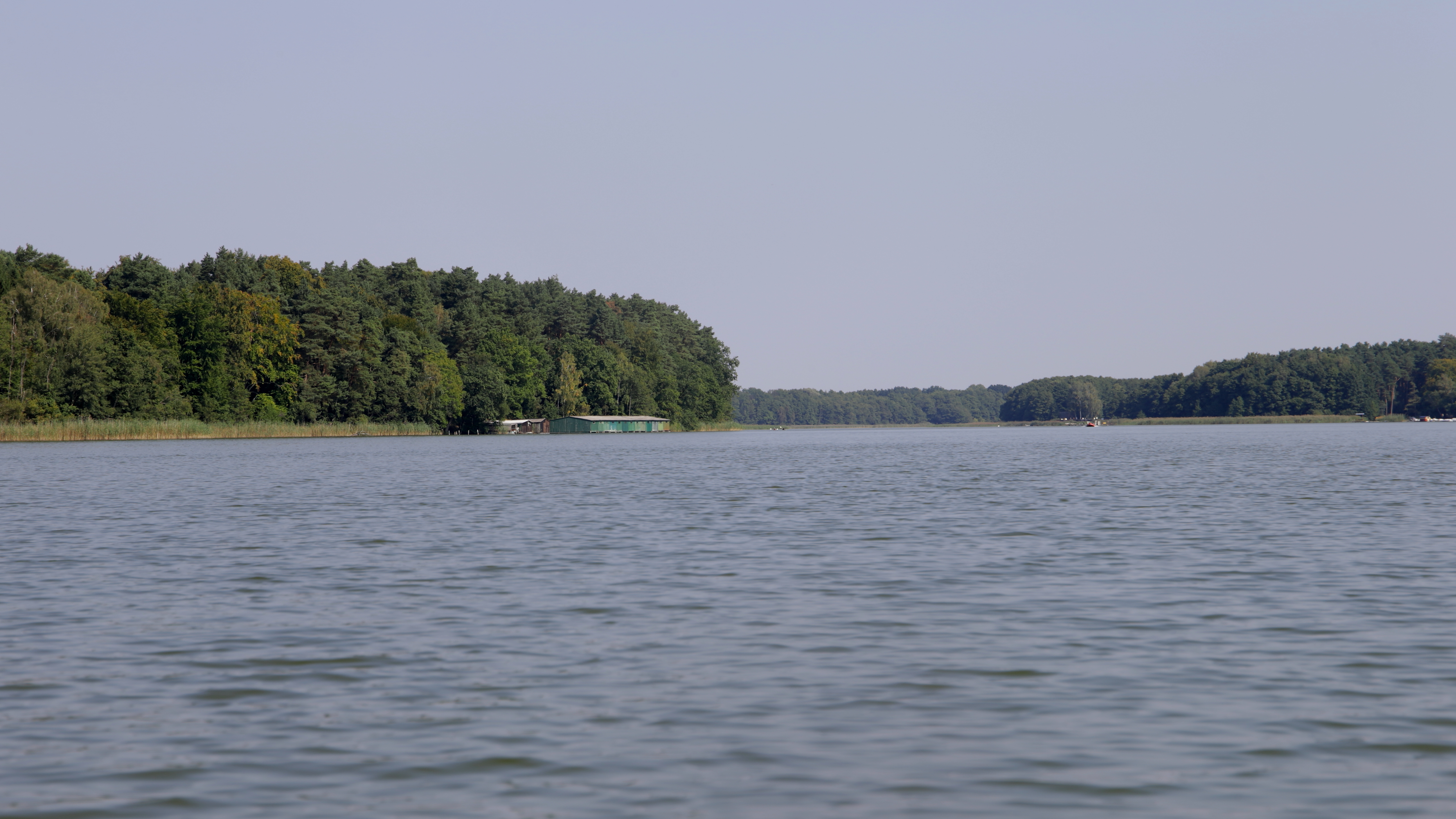

- Location within Mecklenburg-Vorpommern
- Location: Mecklenburgische Seenplatte, Mecklenburg-Vorpommern
- Coordinates: 53°20′43″N 12°49′13″E
- Primary inflows: channel
- Basin countries: Germany
- Surface area: 0.914 km^{2} (0.353 sq mi)
- Max. depth: 14 m (46 ft)
- Surface elevation: 58.6 m (192 ft)

Leppinsee is a lake located in the Mecklenburgische Seenplatte district in Mecklenburg-Vorpommern, Germany. The lake has an elevation of 58.6 meters and a surface area of 0.914 square kilometers. There are also a few campsites near Leppinsee, such as Campingplatz am Leppinsee, which has pitches for tents and caravans.
