= Rederangsee =

Lake in Mecklenburg-Vorpommern, Germany

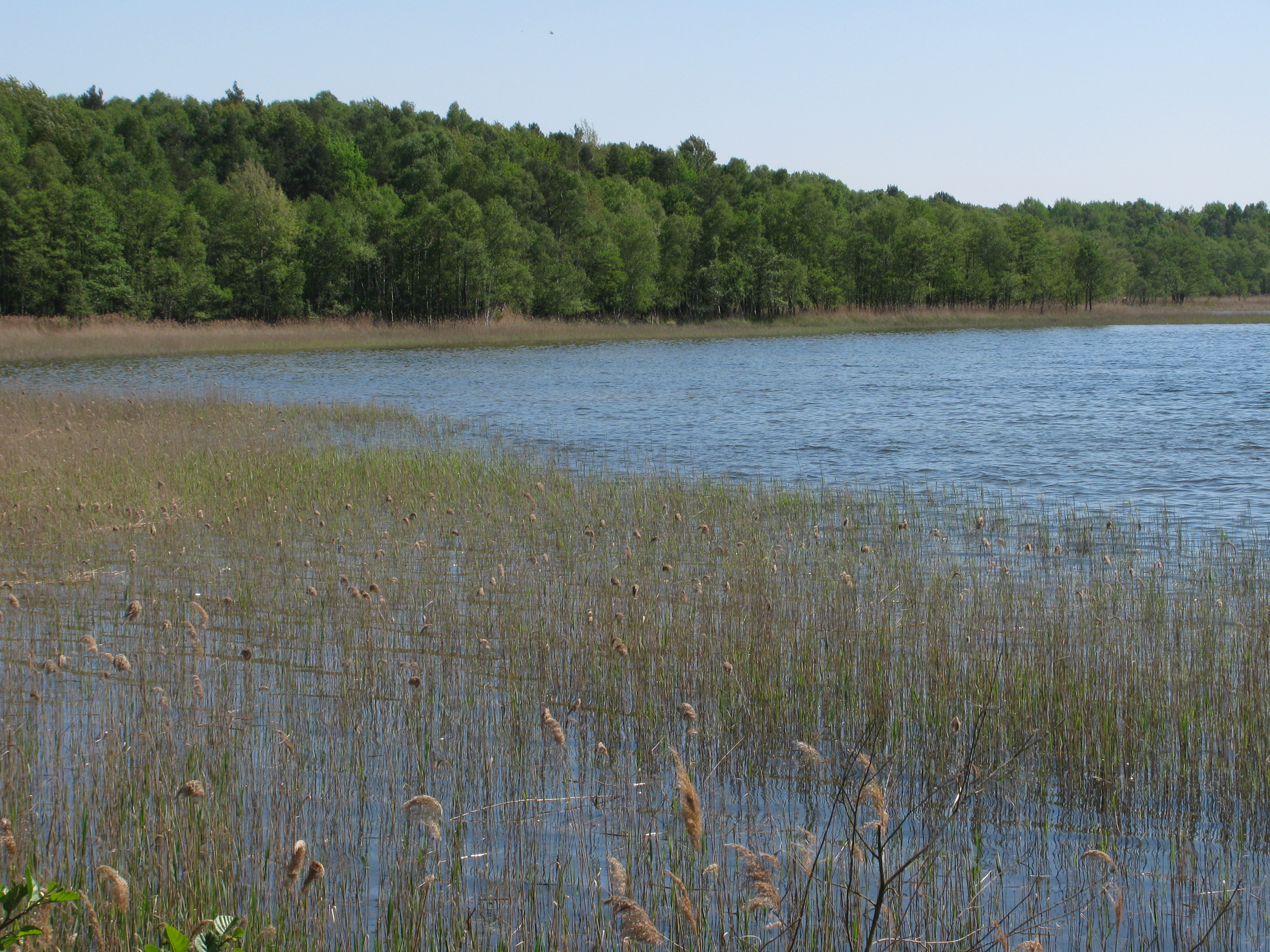

- Location within Mecklenburg-Vorpommern
- Location: Mecklenburgische Seenplatte, Mecklenburg-Vorpommern
- Coordinates: 53.456576°N 12.750664°E
- Basin countries: Germany
- Surface area: 2 km^{2} (0.77 sq mi)
- Surface elevation: 62.5 m (205 ft)

Rederangsee is a lake in the Mecklenburgische Seenplatte district in Mecklenburg-Vorpommern, Germany. At an elevation of 62.5 m (205 ft), its surface area is 2 km^{2} (0.77 sq mi).
