= Tangahnsee =

Lake in Germany

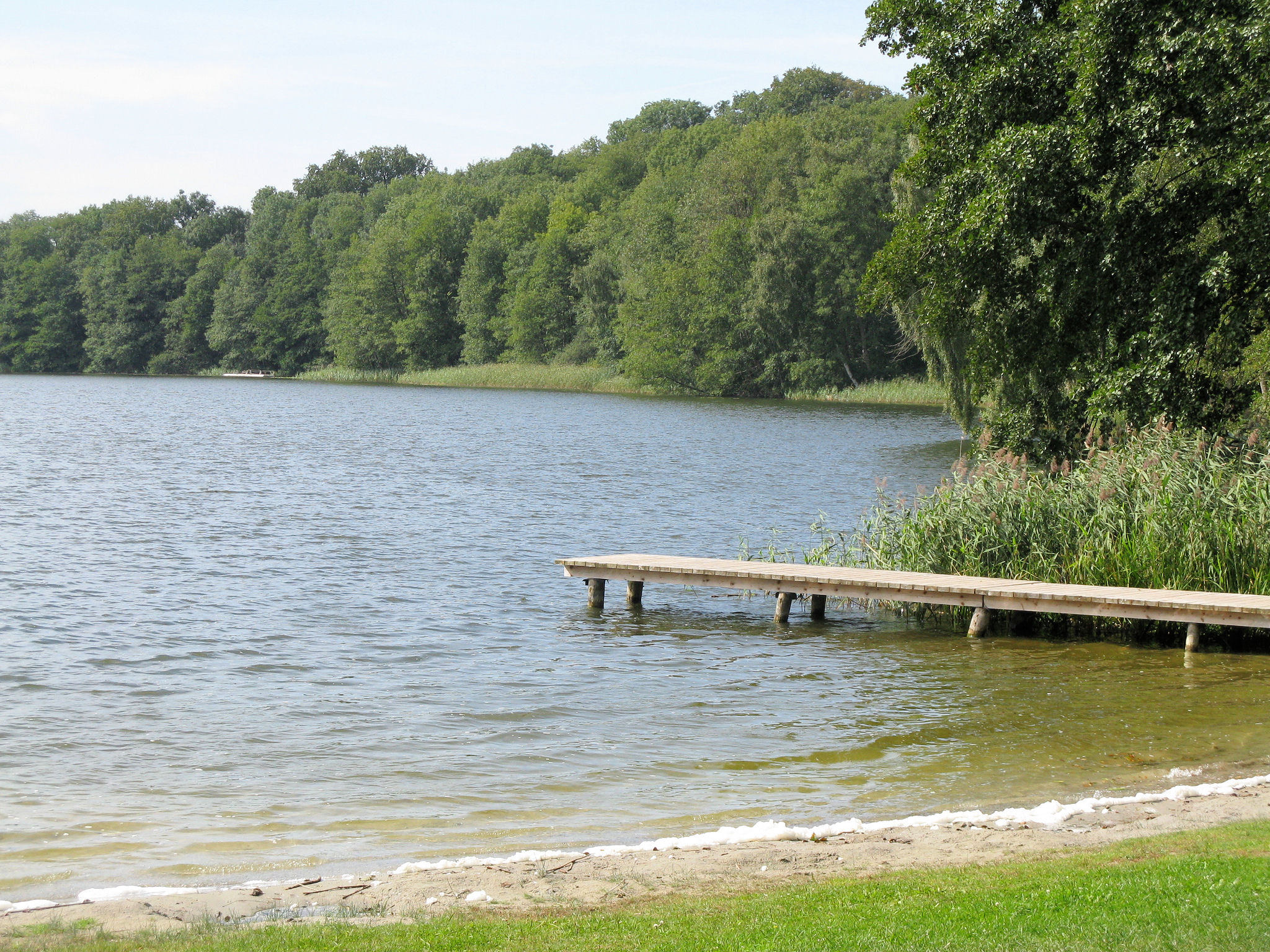

- Location within Mecklenburg-Vorpommern
- Location: Mecklenburgische Seenplatte, Mecklenburg-Vorpommern
- Coordinates: 53°23′46″N 12°28′30″E
- Basin countries: Germany
- Surface area: 0.258 km^{2} (0.100 sq mi)
- Surface elevation: 73 m (240 ft)

Tangahnsee is a lake in the Mecklenburgische Seenplatte district in Mecklenburg-Vorpommern, Germany. At an elevation of 73 m, its surface area is 0.258 km^{2}.
