= Camminer See =

Lake in Mecklenburg-Vorpommern, Germany

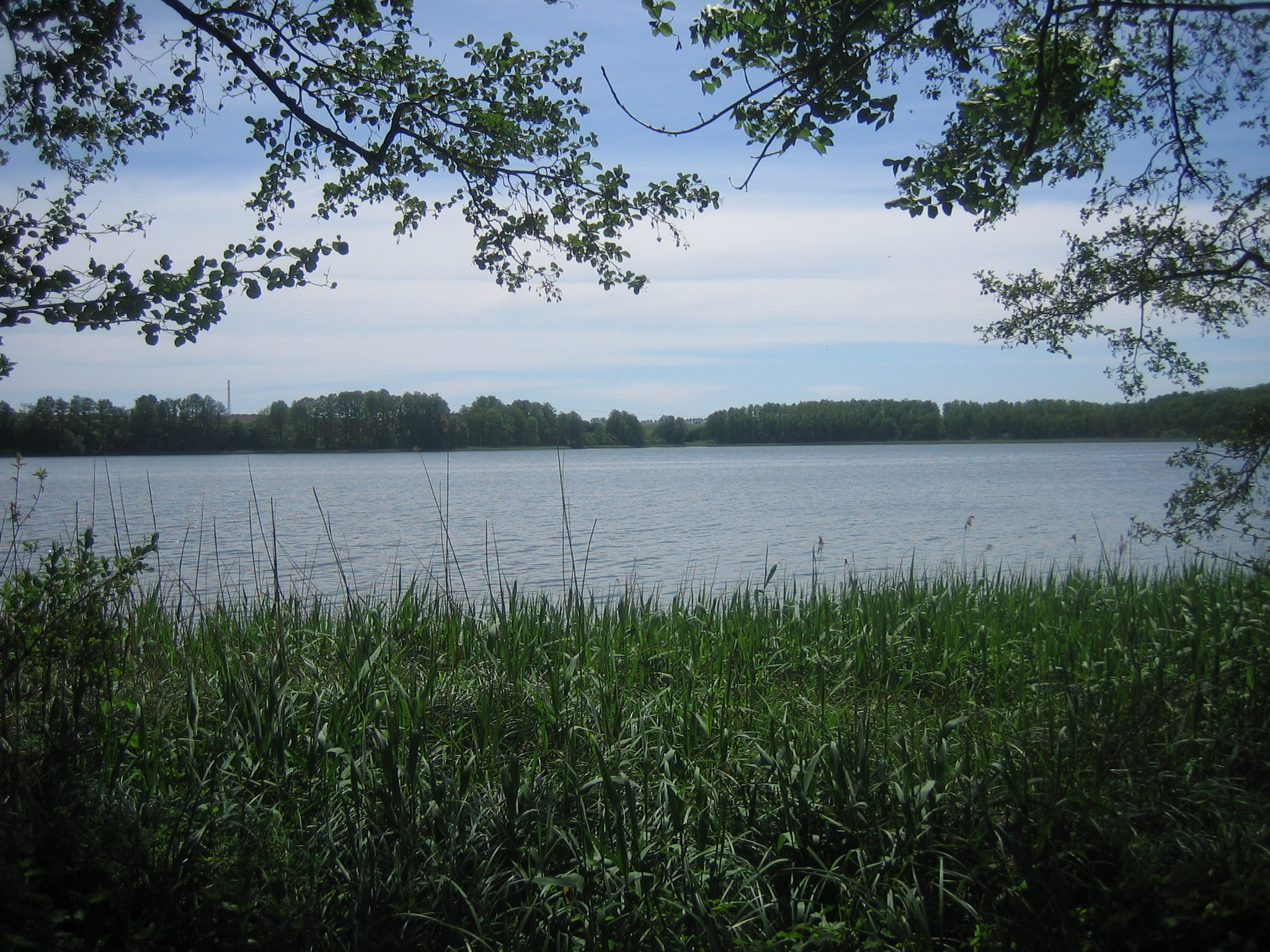
- Camminer See, Mecklenburg District Lake

- Location within Mecklenburg-Vorpommern
- Location: Mecklenburgische Seenplatte, Mecklenburg-Vorpommern
- Coordinates: 53.43518°N 13.3108°E
- Basin countries: Germany
- Surface area: 0.584 km^{2} (0.225 sq mi)
- Surface elevation: 61 m (200 ft)

Camminer See is a lake in the Mecklenburgische Seenplatte district in Mecklenburg-Vorpommern, Germany. At an elevation of 61 m, its surface area is 0.584 km².
