= Kleiner Labussee =

Lake

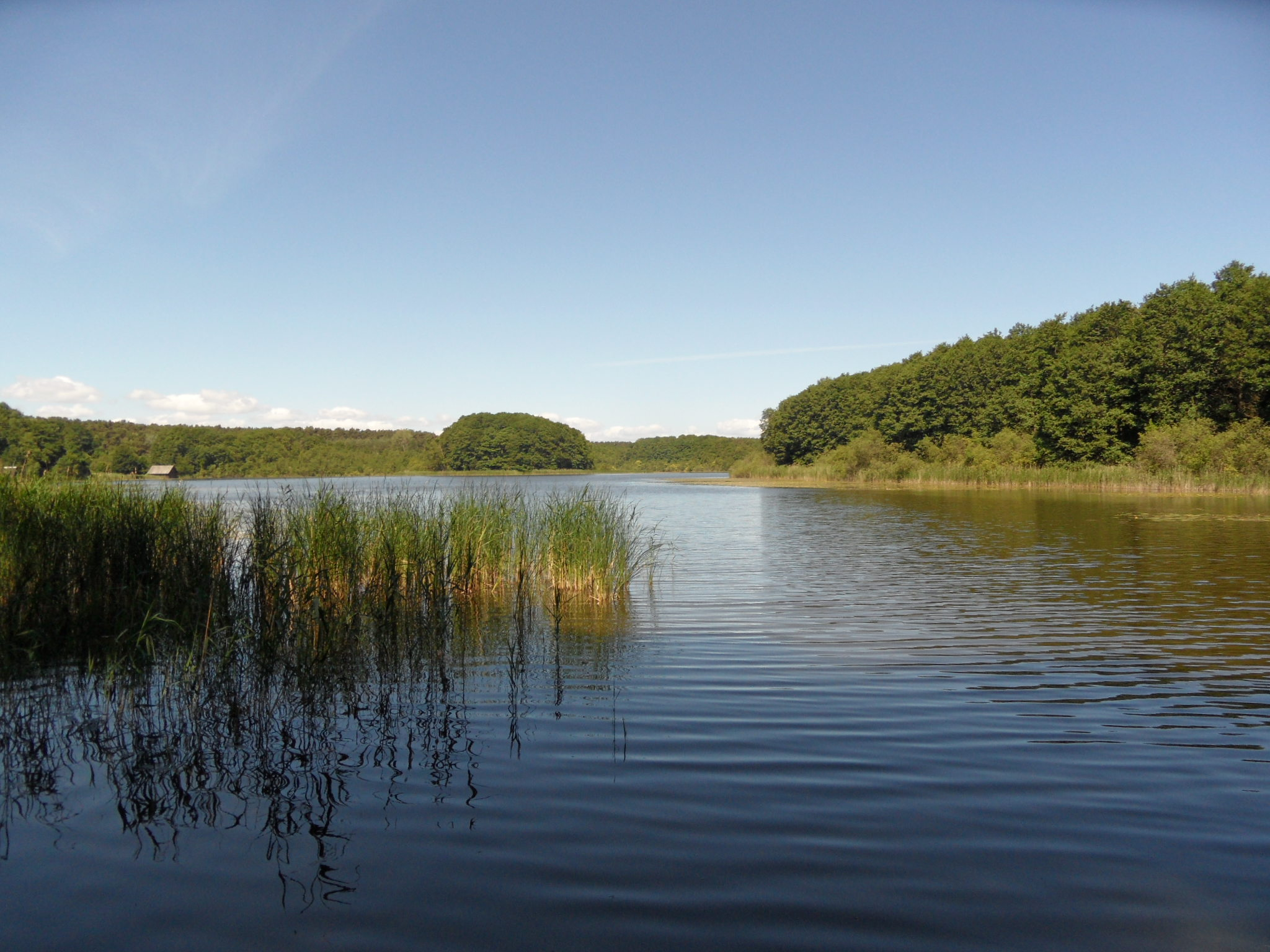

- Location within Mecklenburg-Vorpommern
- Location: Mecklenburgische Seenplatte, Mecklenburg-Vorpommern
- Coordinates: 53°17′36″N 12°56′33″E
- Basin countries: Germany
- Surface area: 0.15 km^{2} (0.058 sq mi)
- Surface elevation: 57.5 m (189 ft)

Kleiner Labussee is a lake in the Mecklenburgische Seenplatte district, Mecklenburg-Vorpommern, Germany. At an elevation of 57.5 m, its surface area is 0.15 km^{2}.
