= Pomelsee =

Lake in Germany

- Location within Mecklenburg-Vorpommern
- Location: Mecklenburgische Seenplatte, Mecklenburgische Seenplatte, Mecklenburg-Vorpommern
- Coordinates: 53°15′38″N 12°57′32″E
- Primary inflows: none
- Primary outflows: canal to Schwaanhavel
- Basin countries: Germany
- Surface area: 0.15 km^{2} (0.058 sq mi)
- Surface elevation: 55.8 m (183 ft)

Pomelsee is a lake in Mecklenburgische Seenplatte, Mecklenburgische Seenplatte, Mecklenburg-Vorpommern, Germany. At an elevation of 55.8 m, its surface area is 0.15 km^{2}.
