= Großer Brückentinsee =

Lake in Mecklenburg-Vorpommern, Germany

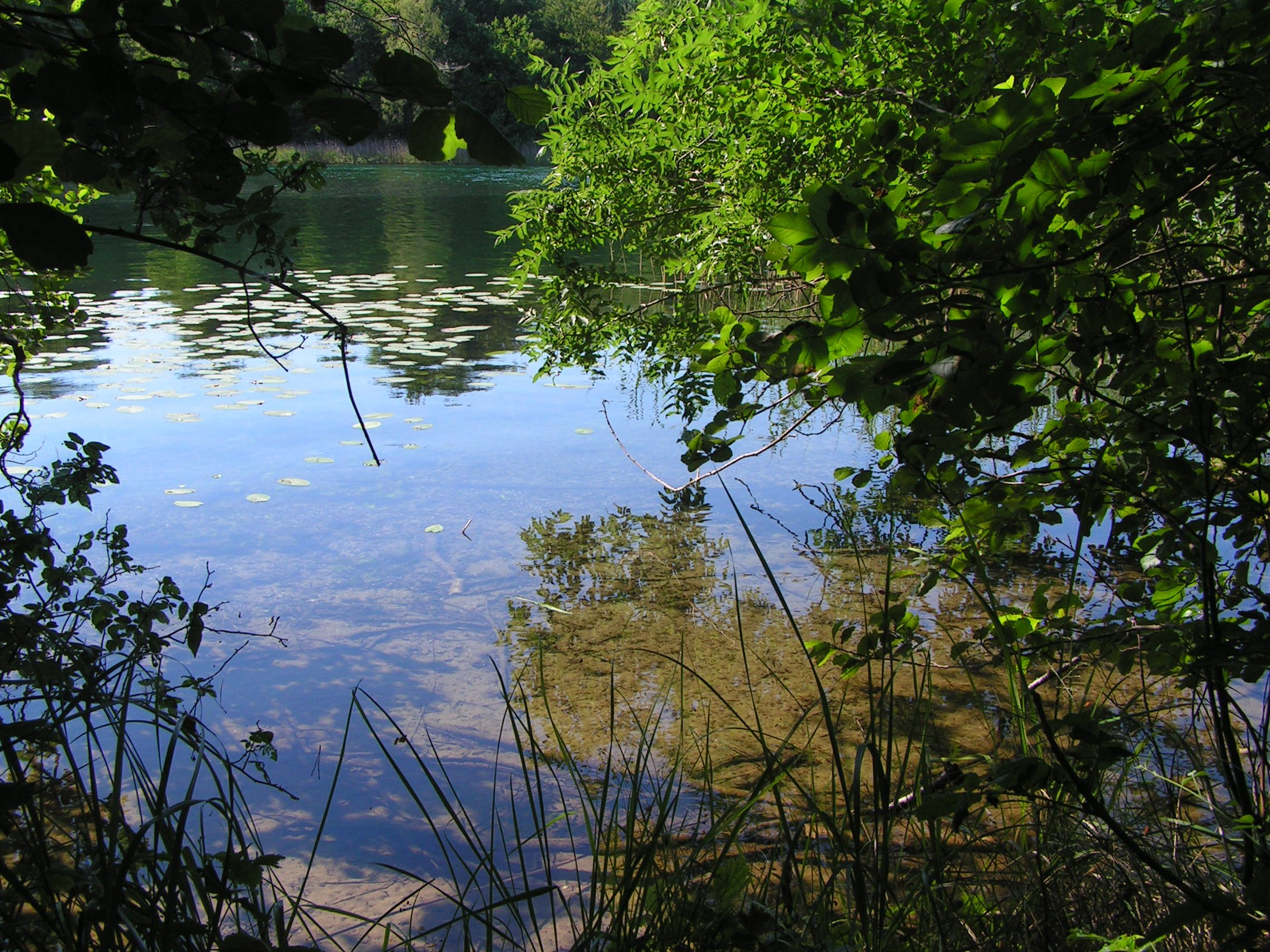

- Location within Mecklenburg-Vorpommern
- Location: Mecklenburgische Seenplatte, Mecklenburg-Vorpommern
- Coordinates: 53°15′31″N 13°14′35″E
- Basin countries: Germany
- Surface area: 1.34 km^{2} (0.52 sq mi)
- Average depth: 11.6 m (38 ft)
- Max. depth: 29.4 m (96 ft)
- Surface elevation: 59.9 m (197 ft)

Großer Brückentinsee is a lake in the Mecklenburgische Seenplatte district in Mecklenburg-Vorpommern, Germany. At an elevation of 59.9 m, its surface area is 1.34 km².
