= Mürtzsee =

Lake in Mecklenburg-Vorpommern, Germany

- Location within Mecklenburg-Vorpommern
- Location: Mecklenburgische Seenplatte, Mecklenburg-Vorpommern
- Coordinates: 53°24′19″N 13°07′45″E
- Basin countries: Germany
- Surface area: 0.252 km^{2} (0.097 sq mi)
- Surface elevation: 70.7 m (232 ft)

Mürtzsee is a lake in the Mecklenburgische Seenplatte district in Mecklenburg-Vorpommern, Germany. At an elevation of 70.7 m, its surface area is 0.252 km^{2}.
