= Kleiner Pälitzsee =

Lake in Germany

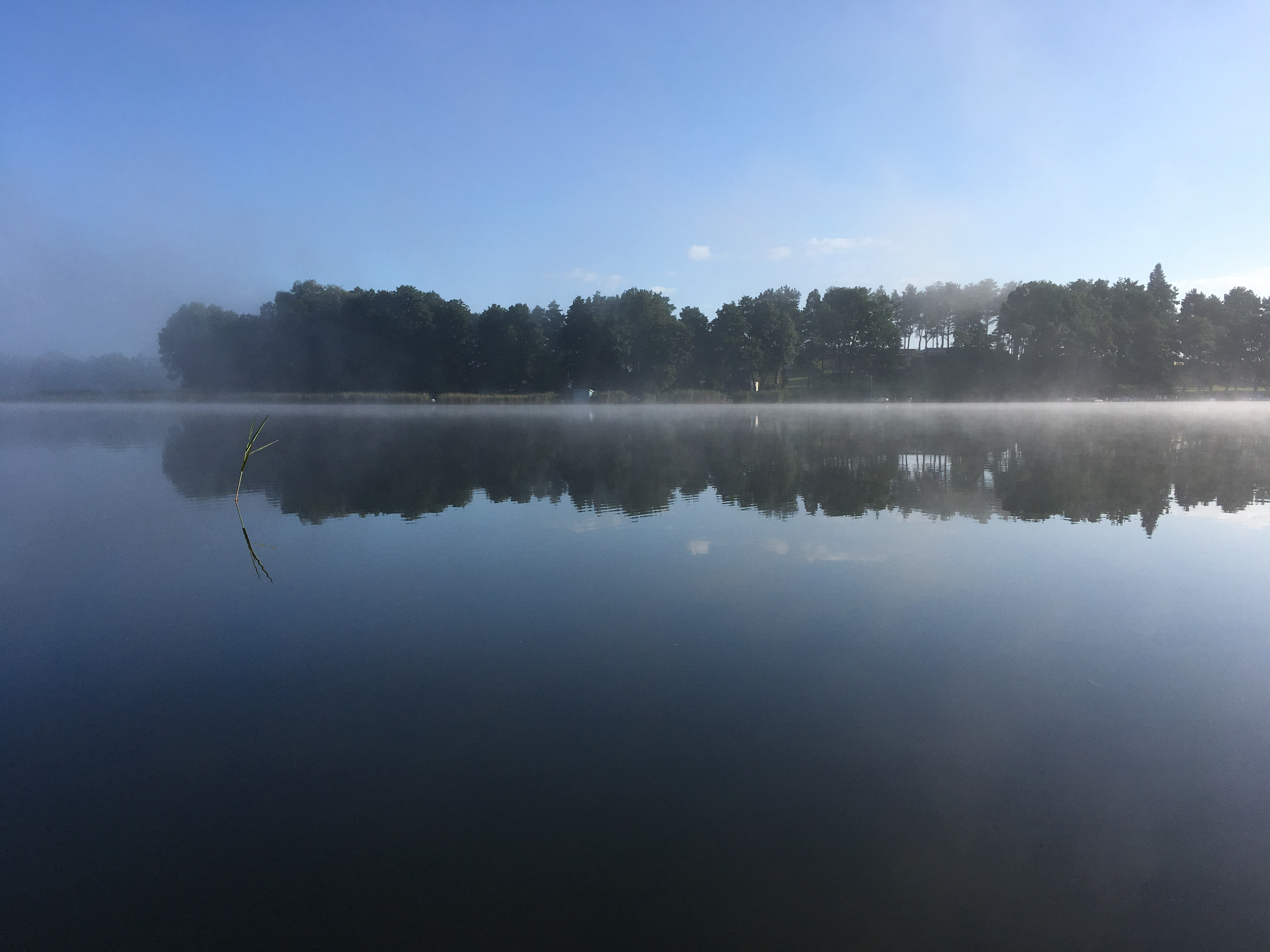

- Location within Mecklenburg-Vorpommern
- Location: Mecklenburgische Seenplatte, Mecklenburg-Vorpommern
- Coordinates: 53°11′40.25671″N 12°56′1.15723″E
- Primary inflows: Müritz–Havel–Wasserstraße
- Primary outflows: Müritz–Havel–Wasserstraße
- Basin countries: Germany
- Surface area: 2.01 km^{2} (0.78 mi^{2})
- Surface elevation: 56.1 m (184 ft)

Kleiner Pälitzsee is a lake in the Mecklenburgische Seenplatte district in Mecklenburg-Vorpommern, Germany. At an elevation of 56.1 metres (184 ft), its surface area is 2.01 square kilometres (0.78 mi^{2}).
