= Großer Stadtsee =

Lake in Mecklenburg-Vorpommern, Germany

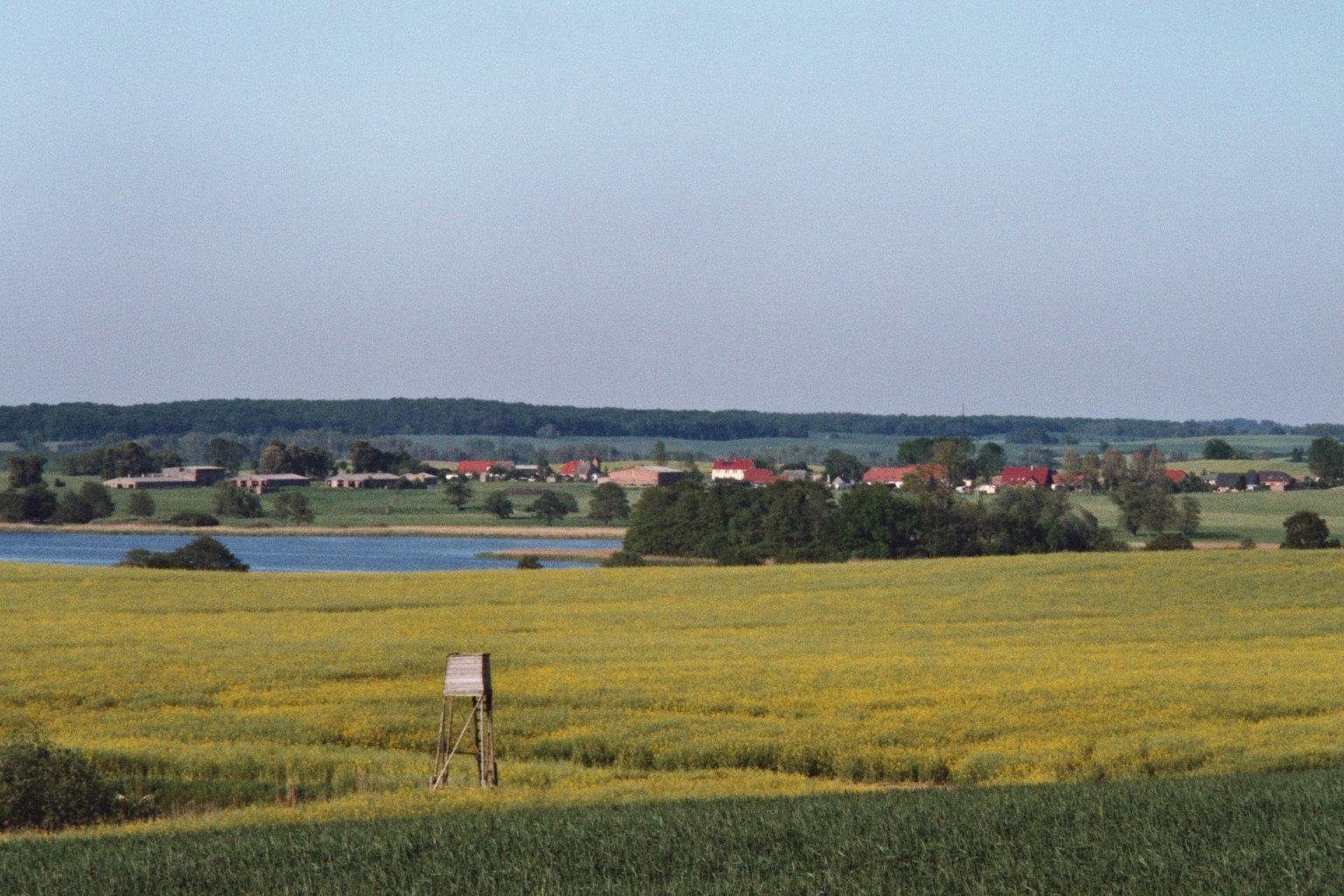

- Location within Mecklenburg-Vorpommern
- Location: Mecklenburgische Seenplatte, Mecklenburg-Vorpommern
- Coordinates: 53°29′43″N 13°5′25.81201″E
- Primary outflows: Wurzenbach
- Basin countries: Germany
- Surface area: 0.88 km^{2} (0.34 sq mi)
- Surface elevation: 43.9 m (144 ft)
- Settlements: Penzlin

Großer Stadtsee is a lake in the Mecklenburgische Seenplatte district in Mecklenburg-Vorpommern, Germany. At an elevation of 43.9 m, its surface area is 0.88 km^{2}.
