= Zieskensee =

Lake in Mecklenburg-Vorpommern, Germany

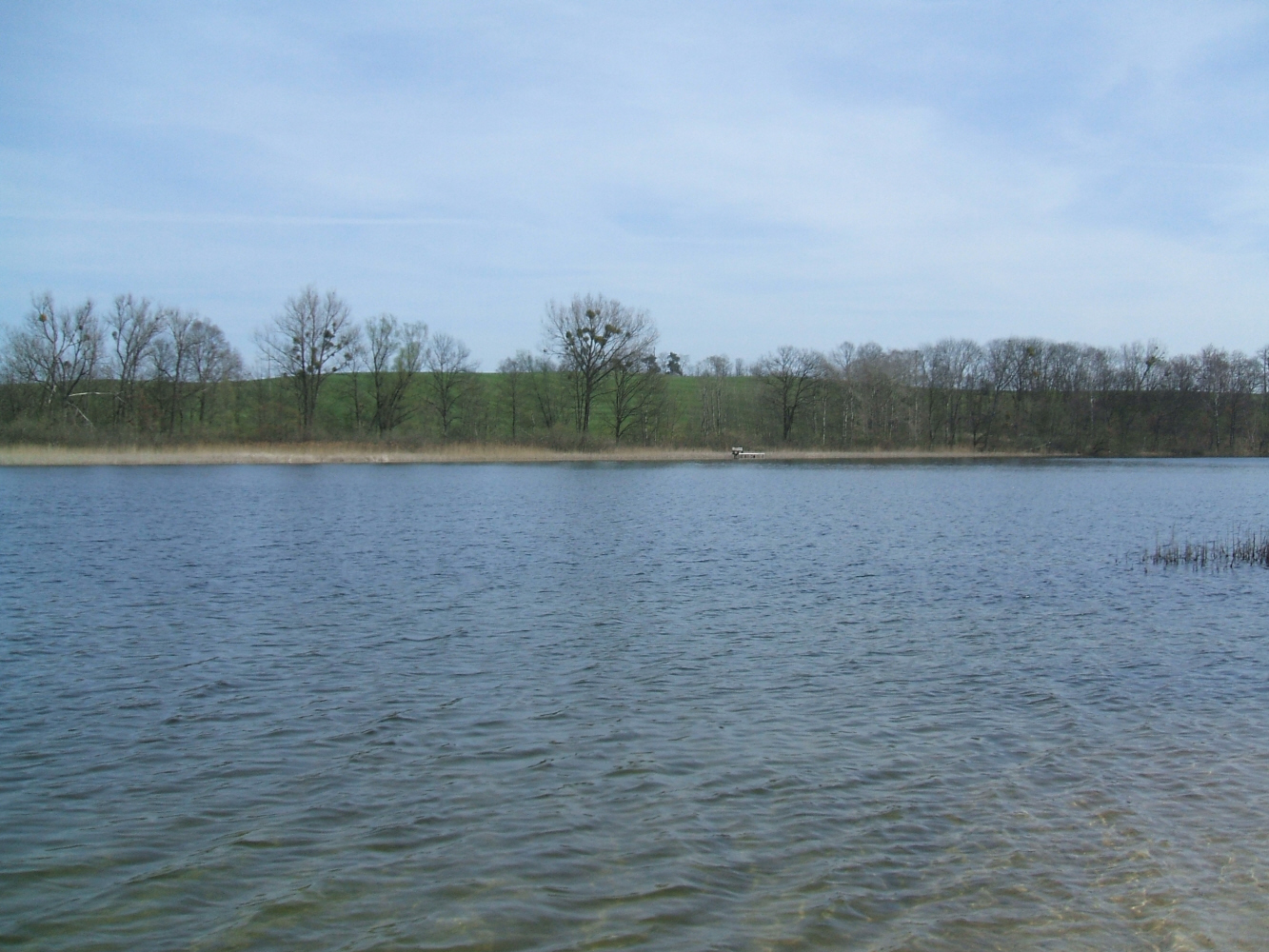

- Location within Germany
- Location: Mecklenburgische Seenplatte, Mecklenburg-Vorpommern
- Coordinates: 53°31′43.97″N 13°4′43.35″E
- Primary outflows: none
- Basin countries: Germany
- Max. length: 800 m (2,600 ft)
- Max. width: 250 m (820 ft)
- Surface area: 0.172 km^{2} (0.066 sq mi)
- Max. depth: 11 m (36 ft)
- Surface elevation: 46 m (151 ft)

Zieskensee is a lake in the Mecklenburgische Seenplatte district in Mecklenburg-Vorpommern, Germany. It is 800m long and up to 250m wide. The deepest point is 11m. It has 50m of sandy beach on its western shore. At an elevation of 46 m, its surface area is 0.172 km^{2}.
