= Tüzer See =

Lake in northeast Germany

- Location within Mecklenburg-Vorpommern
- Location: Mecklenburgische Seenplatte, Mecklenburg-Vorpommern
- Coordinates: 53°43′19″N 13°02′8″E
- Basin countries: Germany
- Surface area: ca. 25 ha (62 acres)
- Surface elevation: 51.5 m (169 ft)

Tüzer See is a lake in the Mecklenburgische Seenplatte district in Mecklenburg-Vorpommern, Germany. At an elevation of 51.5 m, its surface area is ca. 0.25 km^{2}.
