= Kleinvielener See =

Lake in Germany

- Location within Mecklenburg-Vorpommern
- Location: Mecklenburgische Seenplatte, Mecklenburg-Vorpommern
- Coordinates: 53°28′05″N 13°2′54″E
- Basin countries: Germany
- Surface area: 0.98 km^{2} (0.38 sq mi)
- Surface elevation: 51.1 m (168 ft)

Kleinvielener See is a lake in the Mecklenburgische Seenplatte district in Mecklenburg-Vorpommern, Germany. At an elevation of 51.1 m, its surface area is 0.98 km².
