= Großer Varchentiner See =

- Location within Mecklenburg-Vorpommern
- Location: Mecklenburgische Seenplatte, Mecklenburg-Vorpommern
- Coordinates: 53°35′45″N 12°50′38″E
- Type: natural freshwater lake
- Primary inflows: Hasselbach
- Basin countries: Germany
- Max. length: 1.75 kilometres (1.09 mi)
- Max. width: 1.55 kilometres (0.96 mi)
- Surface area: 1.81 km^{2} (0.70 sq mi)
- Surface elevation: 34.1 m (112 ft)

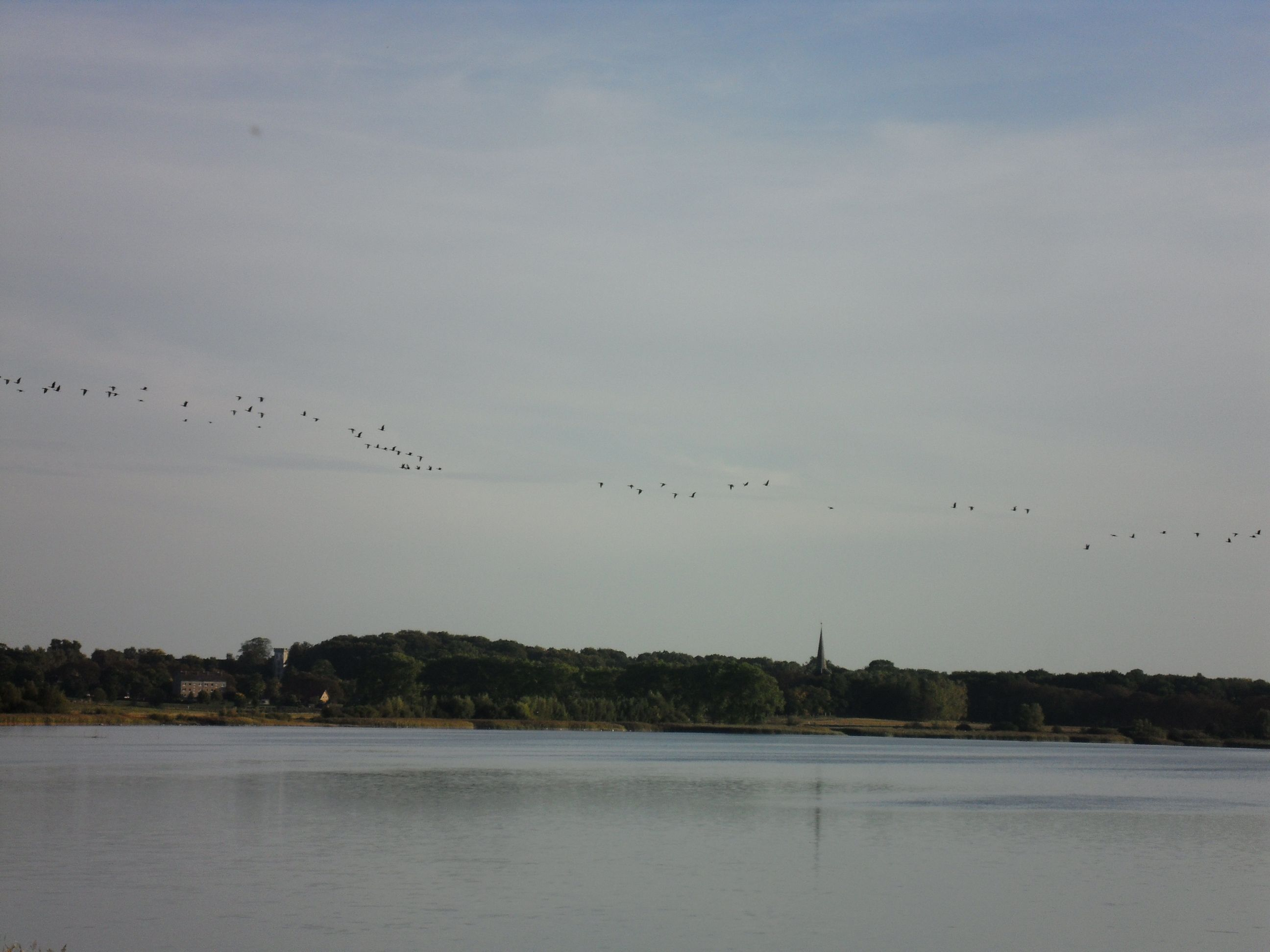
Großer Varchentiner See with a view of Varchentin and Varchentin Castle.

Großer Varchentiner See is a lake in the Mecklenburgische Seenplatte district in Mecklenburg-Vorpommern, Germany. At an elevation of 34.1 m, its surface area is 1.81 km^{2}.
