= Falkenhäger See =

Lake in Mecklenburg-Vorpommern, Germany

- Location within Germany
- Location: Mecklenburgische Seenplatte, Mecklenburg-Vorpommern
- Coordinates: 53°33′25″N 12°42′29″E
- Primary outflows: Stadtgraben
- Basin countries: Germany
- Surface area: 0.01 km^{2} (0.0039 sq mi)
- Surface elevation: 64.8 m (213 ft)

Falkenhäger See is a lake in the Mecklenburgische Seenplatte district in Mecklenburg-Vorpommern, Germany. At an elevation of 64.8 m, its surface area is 0.01 km^{2}.
