= Krummer Woklow =

Lake in Germany

- Location within Mecklenburg-Vorpommern
- Location: Mecklenburgische Seenplatte, Mecklenburgische Seenplatte, Mecklenburg-Vorpommern
- Coordinates: 53°14′42″N 12°55′36″E
- Primary inflows: none
- Primary outflows: none
- Basin countries: Germany
- Surface area: 42 ha (100 acres)
- Surface elevation: 60.5 m (198 ft)

Krummer Woklow is a lake in Mecklenburgische Seenplatte, Mecklenburgische Seenplatte, Mecklenburg-Vorpommern, Germany. At an elevation of 60.5 metres (198 ft), its surface area is 0.42 square kilometres (0.16 sq mi).
