= Loppiner See =

Lake in Mecklenburg-Vorpommern, Germany

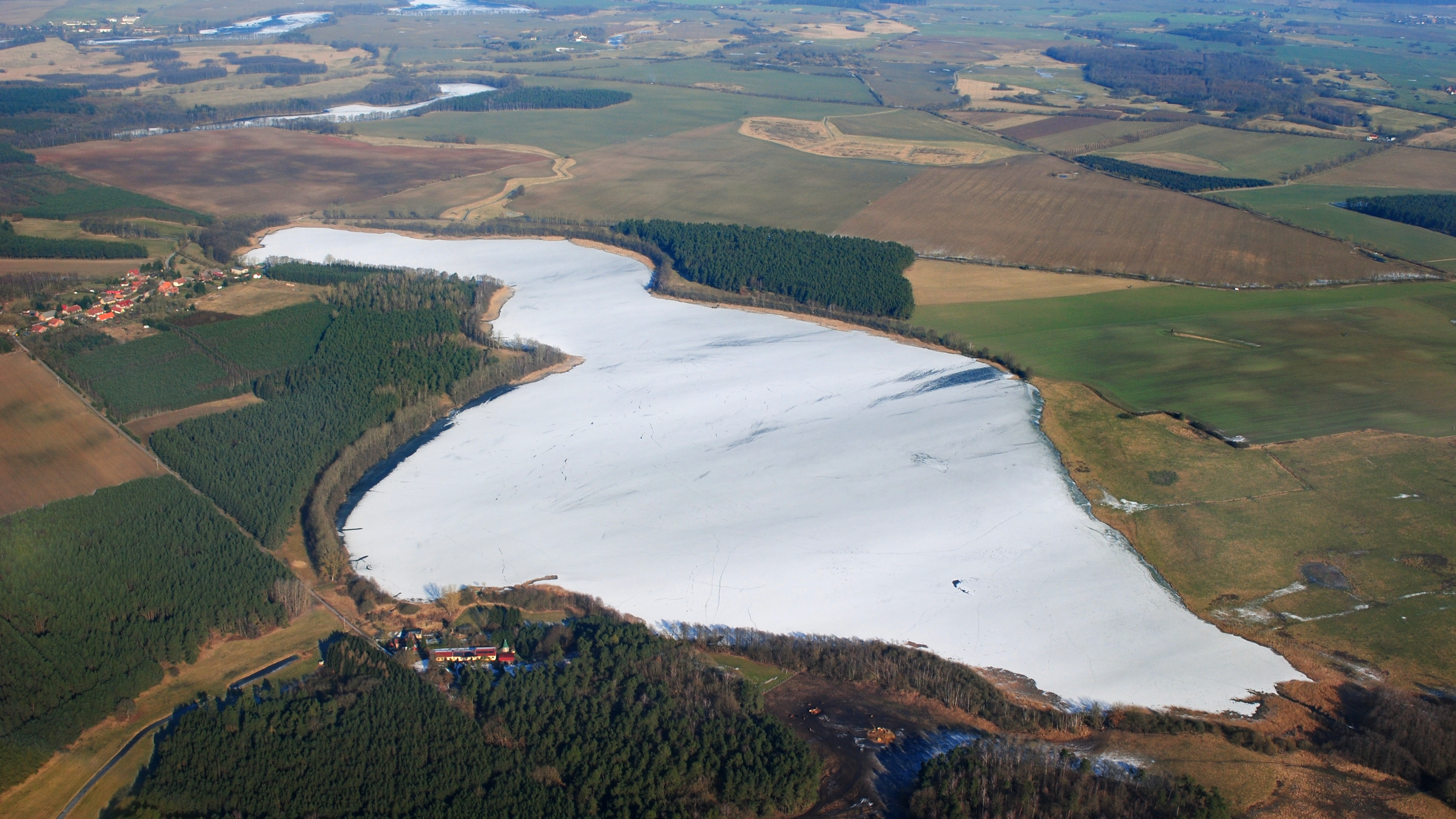
- Loppiner See - view from above

- Location within Mecklenburg-Vorpommern
- Location: Mecklenburgische Seenplatte, Mecklenburg-Vorpommern
- Coordinates: 53°32′49.34″N 12°31′36.54″E
- Basin countries: Germany
- Surface area: 0.86 km^{2} (0.33 sq mi)
- Surface elevation: 62.1 m (204 ft)

Loppiner See is a lake in the Mecklenburgische Seenplatte district in Mecklenburg-Vorpommern, Germany. At an elevation of 62.1 m, its surface area is 0.86 km^{2}.
