= Wienpietschseen =

Lake in Mecklenburg-Vorpommern, Germany

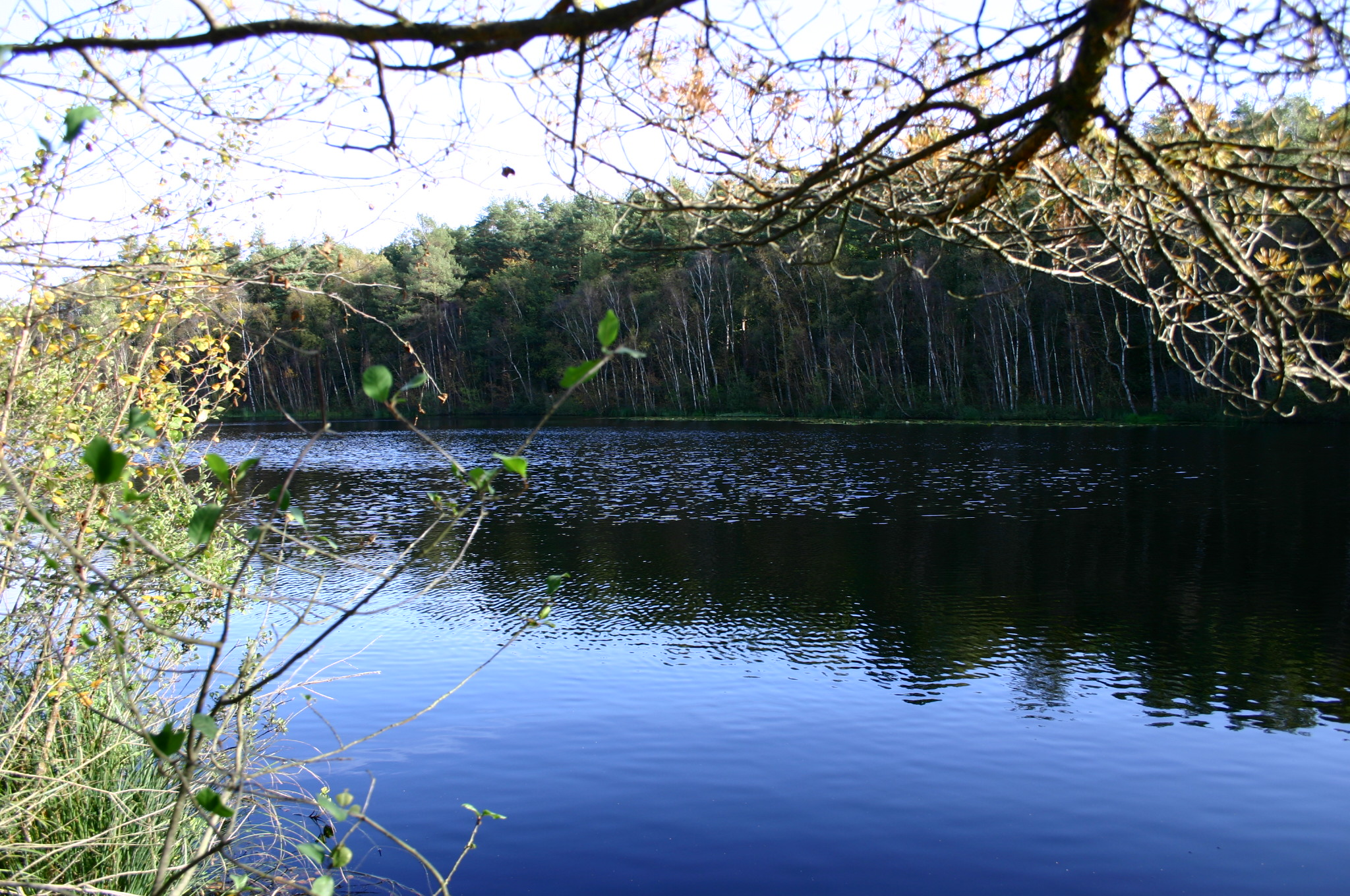
- Wienpietschseen

- Location within Mecklenburg-Vorpommern
- Location: Mecklenburgische Seenplatte, Mecklenburg-Vorpommern
- Coordinates: 53°28′55″N 12°40′39″E
- Basin countries: Germany
- Surface area: 0.025 km^{2} (0.0097 sq mi)
- Surface elevation: 62.5 m (205 ft)

Wienpietschseen is a group of lakes in Mecklenburgische Seenplatte, Mecklenburg-Vorpommern, Germany. At an elevation of 62.5 m, its surface area is 0.025 km^{2}. It is located within the Central European Time Zone (GMT+2.
