= Minzower See =

Lake in Germany

- Location within Mecklenburg-Vorpommern
- Location: Mecklenburgische Seenplatte, Mecklenburg-Vorpommern
- Coordinates: 53°22′50″N 12°30′05″E
- Basin countries: Germany
- Surface area: 0.088 km^{2} (0.034 sq mi)
- Surface elevation: 74.2 m (243 ft)

Minzower See is a lake in the Mecklenburgische Seenplatte district in Mecklenburg-Vorpommern, Germany. At an elevation of 74.2 m, its surface area is 0.088 km².
