= Ivenacker See =

Lake in Germany

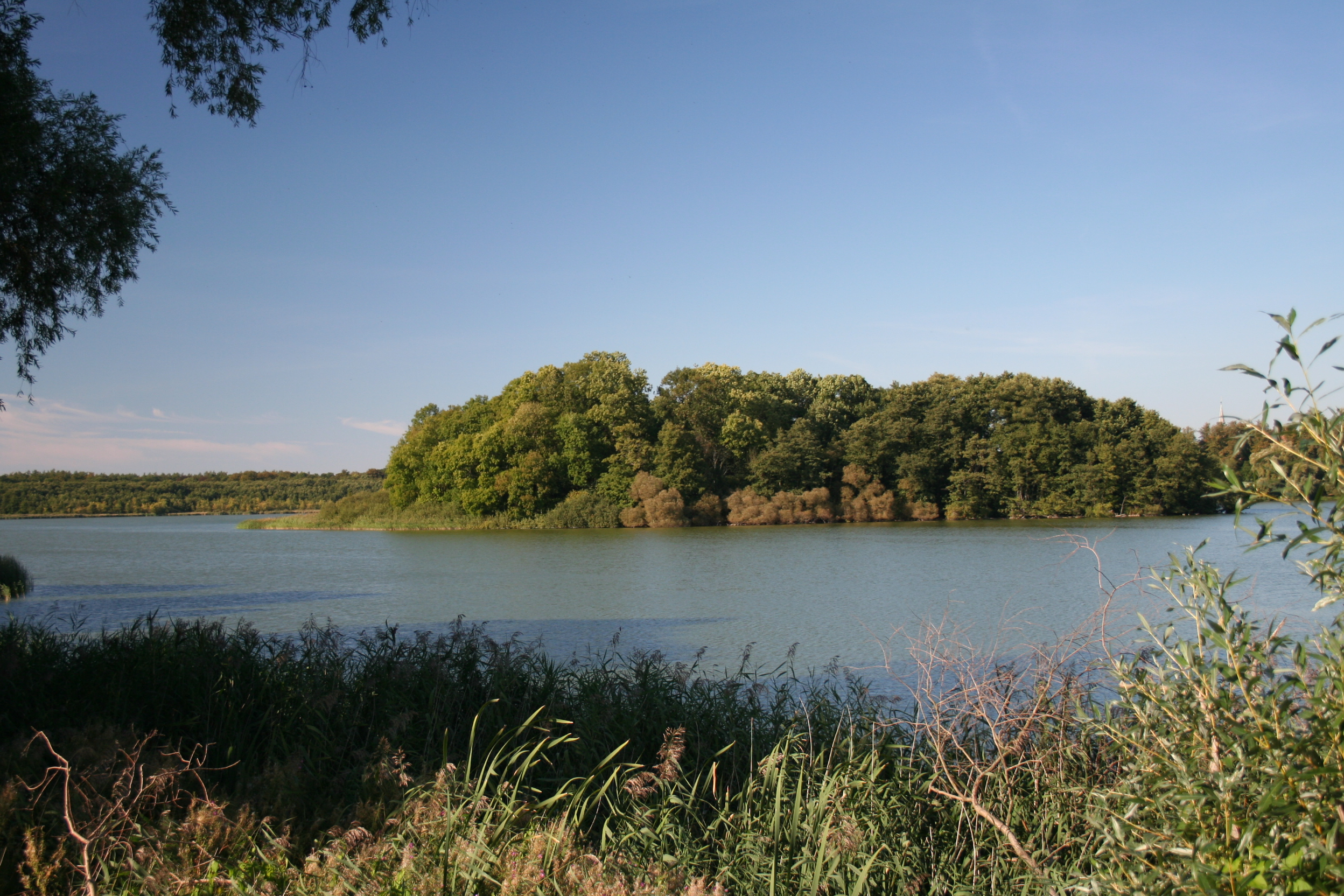

- Location within Mecklenburg-Vorpommern
- Location: Mecklenburgische Seenplatte, Mecklenburg-Vorpommern
- Coordinates: 53°42′26.49″N 12°57′14.14″E
- Primary outflows: Augraben
- Basin countries: Germany
- Surface area: 0.97 km^{2} (0.37 sq mi)
- Surface elevation: 39.5 m (130 ft)

Ivenacker See is a lake in the Mecklenburgische Seenplatte district in Mecklenburg-Vorpommern, Germany. At an elevation of 39.5 m, its surface area is 0.97 km^{2}.
