= Melzer See =

Melzer See may refer to:

- Melzer See (Waren), Germany
- Melzer See (Melz), Germany
