= Feisnecksee =

Lake in Mecklenburg-Vorpommern, Germany

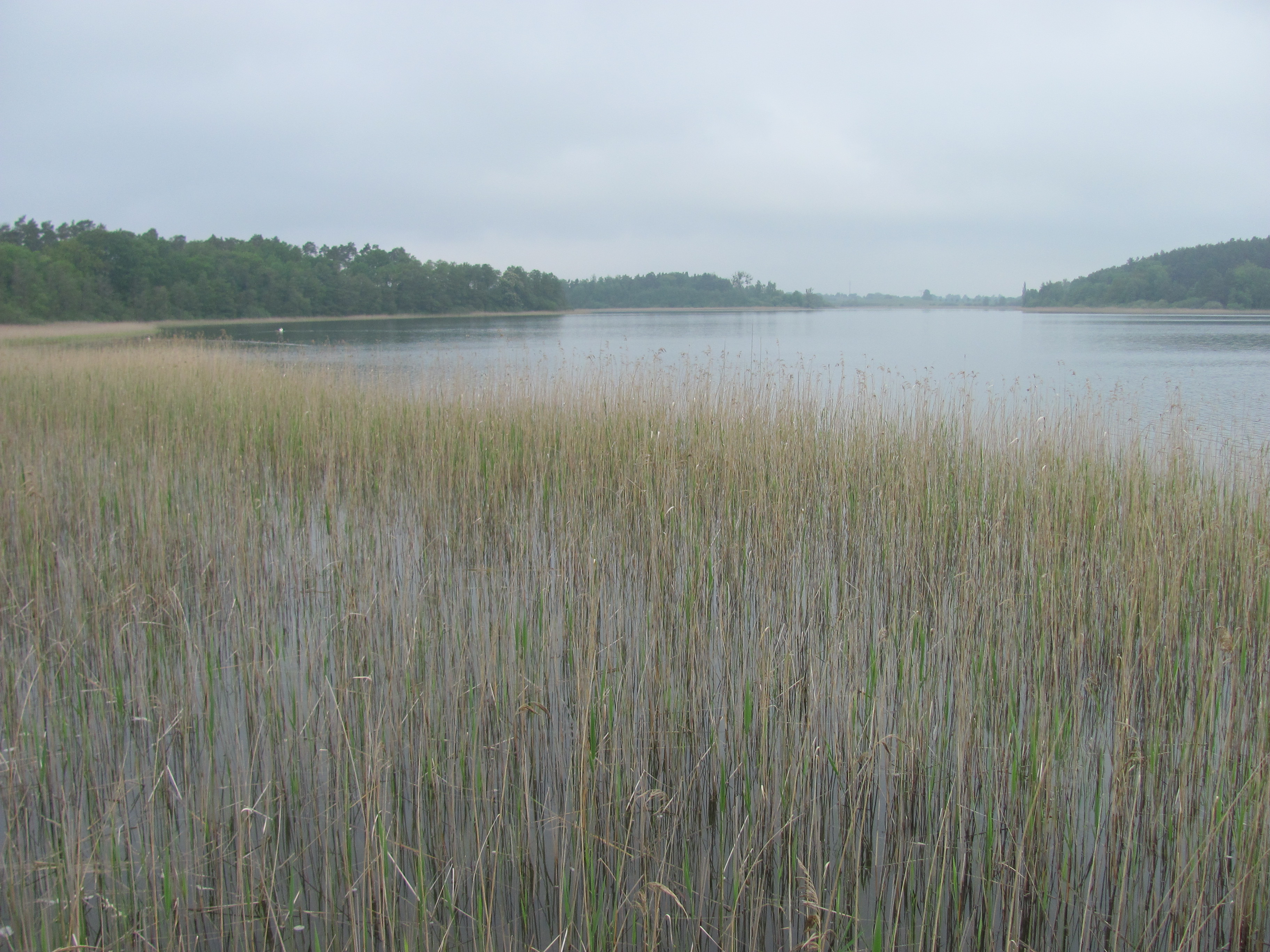
- Southern end of the Feisnecksee

- Location within Mecklenburg-Vorpommern
- Location: Mecklenburgische Seenplatte district, Mecklenburg-Vorpommern
- Coordinates: 53°29′45″N 12°42′28″E
- Primary inflows: ditches e.g. from the Krummen See, Müritz and Waupacksee
- Primary outflows: ditch to Lake Müritz
- Catchment area: 31.9 km^{2} (12.3 sq mi)
- Basin countries: Germany
- Max. length: 3.100 km (1.926 mi)
- Max. width: 0.600 km (0.373 mi)
- Surface area: 1.94 km^{2} (0.75 sq mi)
- Average depth: 7.5 m (25 ft)
- Max. depth: 14 m (46 ft)
- Water volume: 14,570,000 km^{3} (3,500,000 cu mi)
- Surface elevation: 62.1 m (204 ft) above NHN
- Settlements: Waren (Müritz)

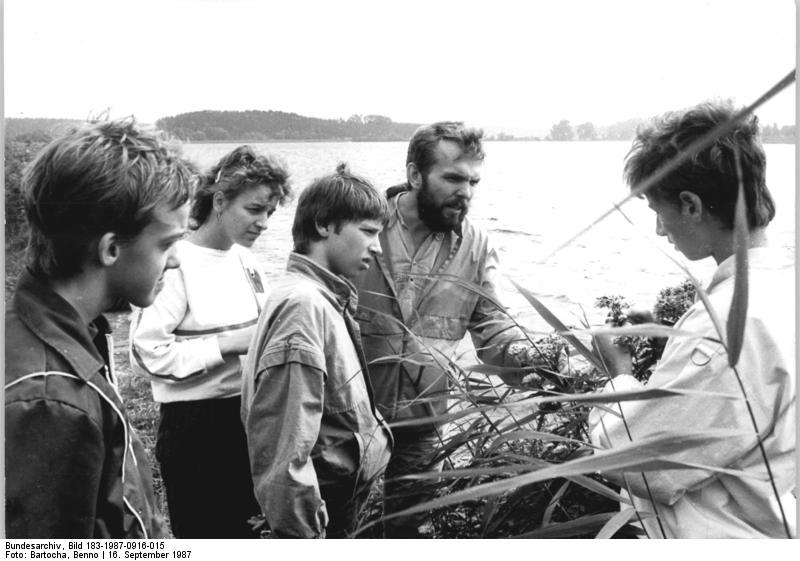
Students at the lake (1987)

The Feisnecksee or Feisneck is a lake on the southeastern perimeter of the town of Waren in Mecklenburgische Seenplatte district in the German state of Mecklenburg-Western Pomerania. It lies at an elevation of 62.1 metres and its surface area is 1.94 km².

The Feisnecksee is joined to the Binnenmüritz to the northwest by a very narrow, shallow and unnavigable ditch. The road runs over a small bridge here that is only wide enough for large vehicles to pass in one direction at a time. The land bridge is about 150 metres wide at this point. The lake is a typical, glacial tunnel valley lake and is divided by a neck and the larger Burgwall Island into a north and south basins. It is about 3,100 metres long and 600 metres wide. Near the southern half is the Waren quarter of Damerow. The lakeshore is completely surrounded by a belt of reed and is also wooded in the south. In the north half of the lake is a bathing area. Fishing is only allowed by special permit because the lake lies in the national park.
