= Weinberg House (Waren) =

Coordinates: 53°31′11″N 12°41′01″E

- Schloss Weinberg
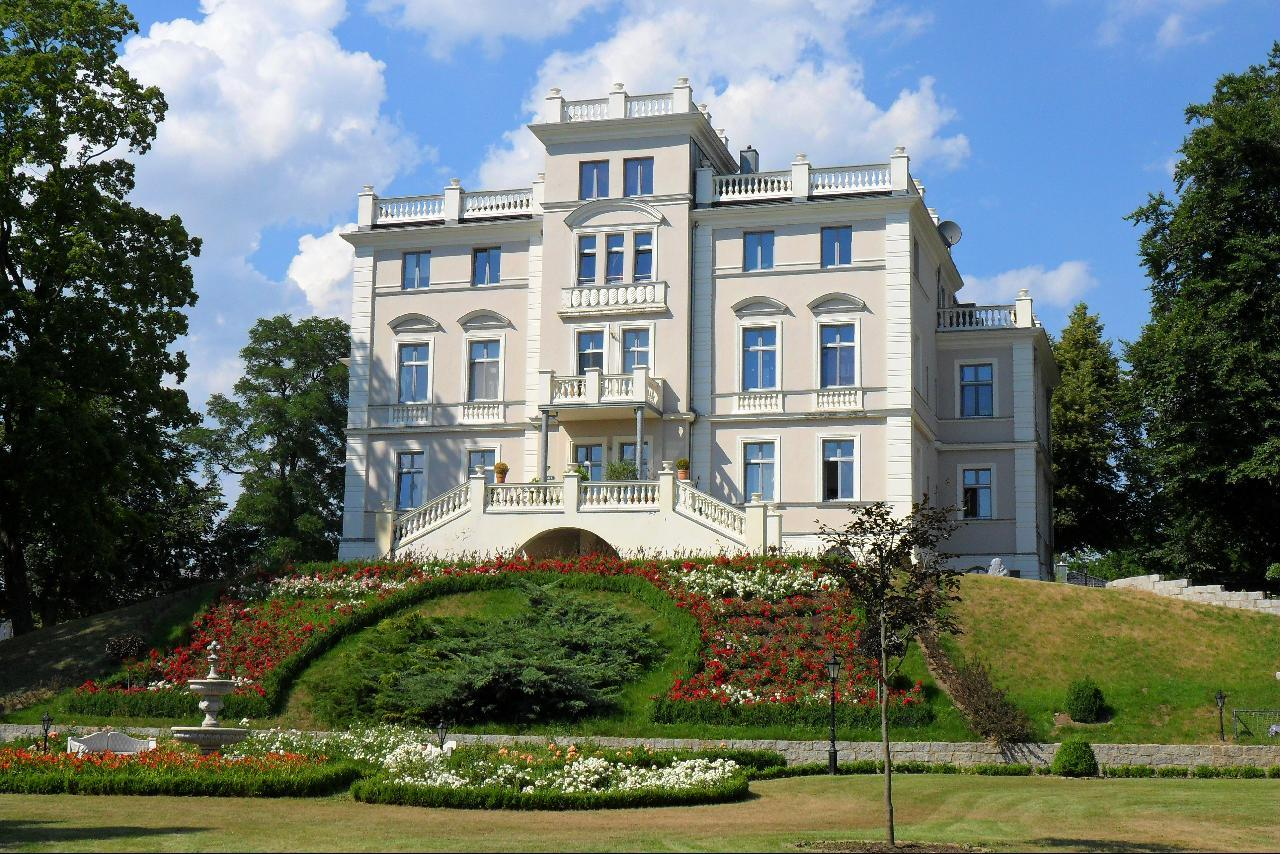

- Location within Mecklenburg-Vorpommern Weinberg House (Waren) (Germany)

General information
- Type: Villa
- Location: Waren (Müritz), Germany
- Completed: October 1875

Design and construction
- Architect: Gustav Werner

Weinberg House is a historicist villa at Bahnhofstraße 26 in the town of Waren (Müritz) in the German state of Mecklenburg-Western Pomerania. Despite subsequent modifications the house is one of the sights of the town. It is known in German as Schloss Weinberg, or colloquially as the Weinbergschloss.

== History ==
Weinberg House in Waren on the shores of Lake Müritz was built in the 1870s by the Waren architect, Gustav Werner, and was completed in October 1875. The owner was Hermann von Maltzan. In autumn at Michaelmas (29 September) 1875 the Malzaneum natural history museum moved into the rooms of the house. After it was sold in 1876 the museum had to move out again. In 1877 the house was bought by Herrmann Bachstein and became the head office for a construction division of the Mecklenburg Southern Railway.

From 1911 to 1939 the folklorist, Richard Wossidlo, lived for periods of time in several rooms in Weinberg House, in which he had housed his numerous records, library holdings and his private folk museum. In 1912, when the collection became too large, Wossidlo sold this museum collection with about 3,400 exhibits to the Grand Duchy of Mecklenburg-Schwerin.

== Literature ==
- Jürgen Kniesz (ed), Was war wann? : Daten zur Warener Stadtgeschichte. Waren, 2000.
