= Johannes Gillhoff =

German teacher and author

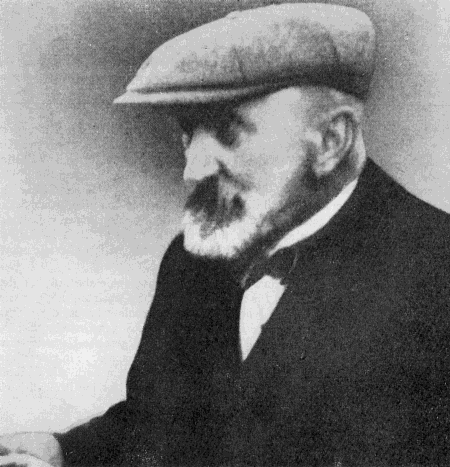
Johannes Gillhoff

Johannes Heinrich Carl Christian Gillhoff (May 24, 1861 – January 16, 1930) was a German teacher and author.

== Early life and teaching ==
Gillhof was born in Glaisin in Mecklenburg-Schwerin. He followed in his father's profession as a teacher. He graduated in 1881 from a teaching school and later passed the teaching examination in Schwerin.

After becoming a teacher Gillhoff would begin collecting colloquial expressions used by locals, starting as early as 1888. Gillhoff collected about 4,000 Low German expressions, speech patterns and proverbs and published them in a report.

== Writing career ==
In 1892 he published a work called Mecklenburgischen Volksrätseln (roughly translated "Mecklenburg folk riddles"). The book unites 931 riddles, plus variants, that Gillhoff subdivided into subject areas. This work by Gillhoff was overshadowed in 1897 by a similar work by Richard Wossidlo.

Gillhoff's most well-known work is the epistolary novel Jürnjakob Swehn der Amerikafahrer, roughly translated into English as "Jürnjakob Swehn, the Traveler to America", was published in 1917. Gillhoff retired from teaching in 1924, but would go on to publish the work called Mecklenburgischen Monatshefte ("Mecklenburg monthly notes"). Gillhoff died in the town of Parchim.

Jürnjakob Swehn der Amerikafahrer is considered his most important work. The book is about a single individual (Jürnjakob Swehn) who had emigrated to the United States in 1868, and details his experiences there in the form of letters sent back to his old school teacher in Mecklenburg. Jürnjakob would travel to Iowa and become a farm hand, and would later marry and gain his own farm and a modest amount of wealth. The book also detailed the establishment of a local German speaking church, their acquiring of a pastor, and the preaching of lay preachers before the arrival of the pastor. Gillhoff's book also discussed the beginnings of a German-speaking school in Jürnjakob Swehn's small community and his homesickness for his "old Mecklenburg".

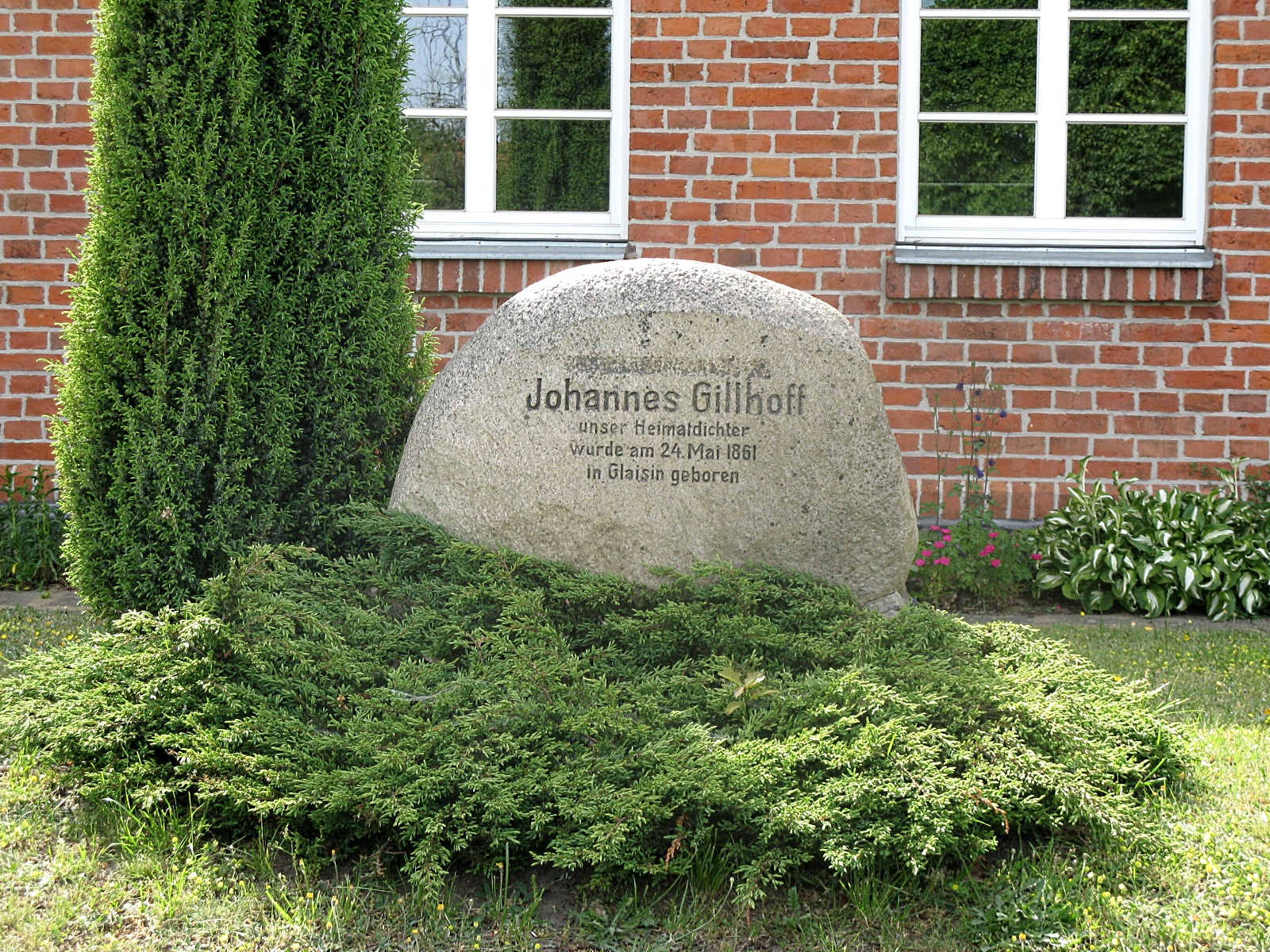
Gedenkstein commemorating Gillhoff in Glaisin.

The style of writing is rough and colloquial, such as would be found in personal correspondence, and the story line contains great degree of spontaneity, with many Mecklenburg proverbs thrown in, mostly in the Low German style. The main character is portrayed as an honest, hard working and modest man with a simple lifestyle. Elements of humor are interspersed throughout the book. The book, which was said to have an earthy charm, enjoyed some success in Germany around the time of its release, with over a million sold. In the year 2000 the book was translated into English and published in the United States, through the help of the University of Iowa.The book was often thought of as fiction, but in actuality it was an amalgam of real letters, detailing real experiences of multiple German (Mecklenburger) immigrants to America. These letters were written by former students of Gillhoff's father, and sent to him over the years. Insights about the experiences these people had, and the life they had lived in Mecklenburg can offer the reader some sharp insights. There are some suggestions that the book was solely or largely based on the experiences of one man named Carl Wiedow who left Glaisin for America in 1868 and died in Iowa in 1913.

== Commemoration ==
There is a small museum in Glaisin honoring the work of Gilhoff, and displaying artifacts surrounding the man and the letters that were sent to him.

== Gillhoff's Works ==
- 1892: Mecklenburgische Volksrätsel
- 1905: Bilder aus dem Dorfleben
- 1917: Jürnjakob Swehn, der Amerikafahrer
- 1925 through 1930: Mecklenburgische Monatshefte
