= Herrensee (Waren) =

Lake in Mecklenburg-Vorpommern, Germany

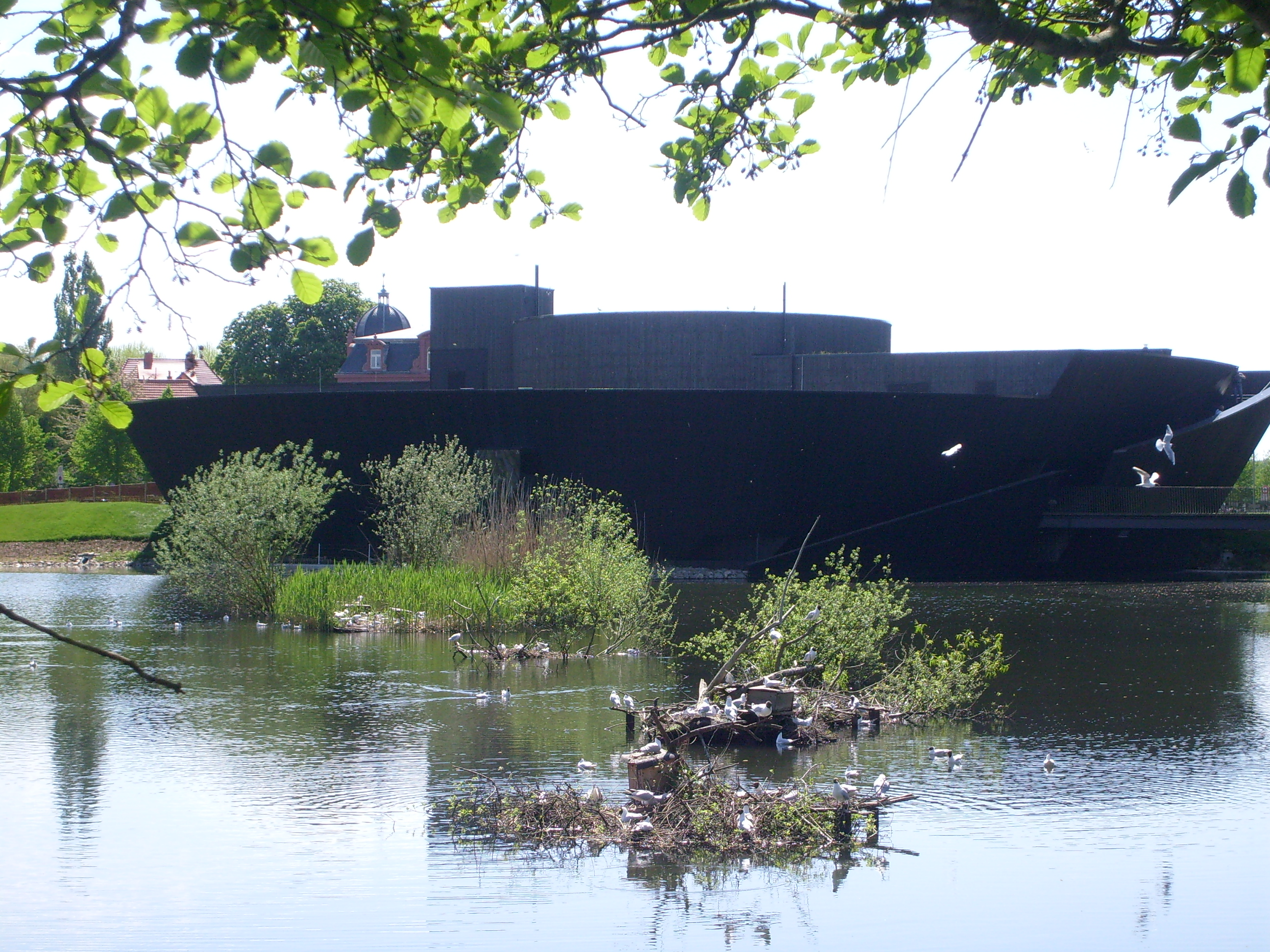
- View over the Herrensee to the Müritzeum

- Location within Mecklenburg-Vorpommern
- Location: Mecklenburgische Seenplatte district, Mecklenburg-Vorpommern
- Coordinates: 53°30′57″N 12°41′01″E
- Primary inflows: Beke from the Tiefwarensee
- Primary outflows: Beke to the Müritz
- Surface area: 0.015 km^{2} (0.0058 sq mi)
- Surface elevation: 62.5 m (205 ft)

The Herrensee is a small lake on the northwestern edge of the old town (Altstadt) of Waren (Müritz) in the district of Mecklenburgische Seenplatte in the German state of Mecklenburg-Western Pomerania.

The originally almost-circular lake was slightly enlarged on its southern shore during the construction of the Information and Nature Experience Centre of Müritzeum. It has an approximate area of 1.5 hectares and a diameter of 130 metres. The lake is filled from the east by the Beke that carries water from the Tiefwarensee, 230 metres away, and is also drained by the Beke to the southwest into the Binnenmüritz just 70 metres away. The lake contains several small bush-covered islets that are used as nesting sites by water fowl.

The Herrensee lies on the edge of a small park and there is a nature trail running around it. It gives its name to the bridge that divides the park, the Herrensee Bridge (Herrenseebrücke), which runs over the B 192 federal road and the Lloyd Railway and links the Old Town to the quarter of Waren-Nord.
