= Burgwall Island (Feisnecksee) =

- Burgwallinsel
- Waren (Müritz) - Feisnecksee
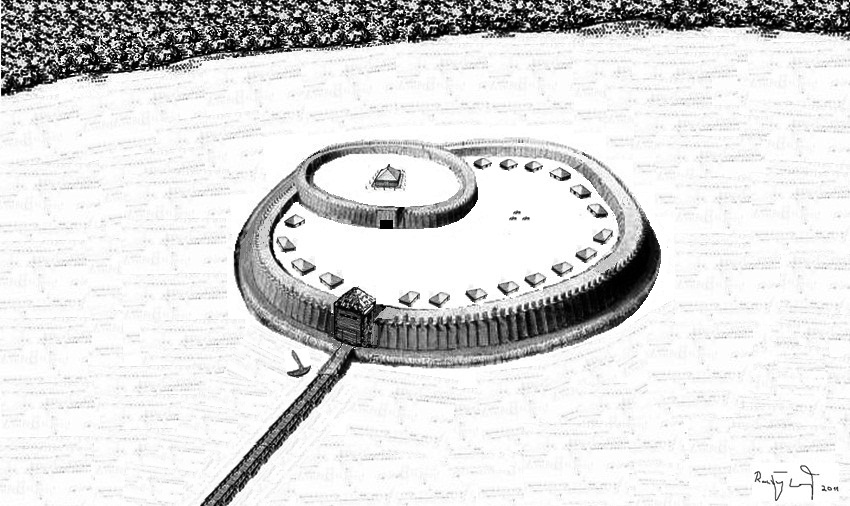
- Artist's reconstruction of Lowland castle

Site information
- Type: Lowland castle, island location
- Code: DE-MV
- Condition: Remnants of rampart

Location
- Coordinates: 53°29′39″N 12°42′26″E
- Height: 62 m above sea level (NN)

Site history
- Built: 7th to 8th century

Burgwall Island (German: Burgwallinsel) is an island in the Feisneck lake in the southeast part of the town of Waren (Müritz) in the German district of Mecklenburgische Seenplatte. The name means "castle mound" or "motte".

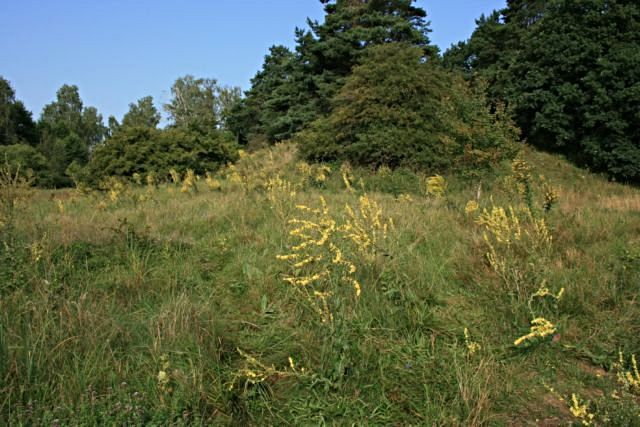

Burgwall Island lies in a small lake, which has an area of 1.94 km². Its name is derived from a castle on the island, only remnants of which remain. It was a typical island castle from the Slavic era. As finds of pottery have shown, the site was already settled during the Old Slavic period of the 7th and 8th centuries and continued to exist until the 12th century. Finds of early German pottery indicated that the island continued to be used after Christianity had been introduced in the Middle Ages. Whether the castle still existed then is not known. The castle site lay in the territory of the Müritz tribe that, during the 10th century, periodically belonged to the Lutici federation.

Today the remains of a rampart may still be made out in the southern part of the wooded island. It looks as if most of it was carried away in the preceding centuries.

== Sources ==
- Ulrich Schoknecht: Der Burgwall in der Feisneck. In: Müritz Almanach, pp. 78–79, 2001.
