= Tiefwarensee =

Lake in Germany

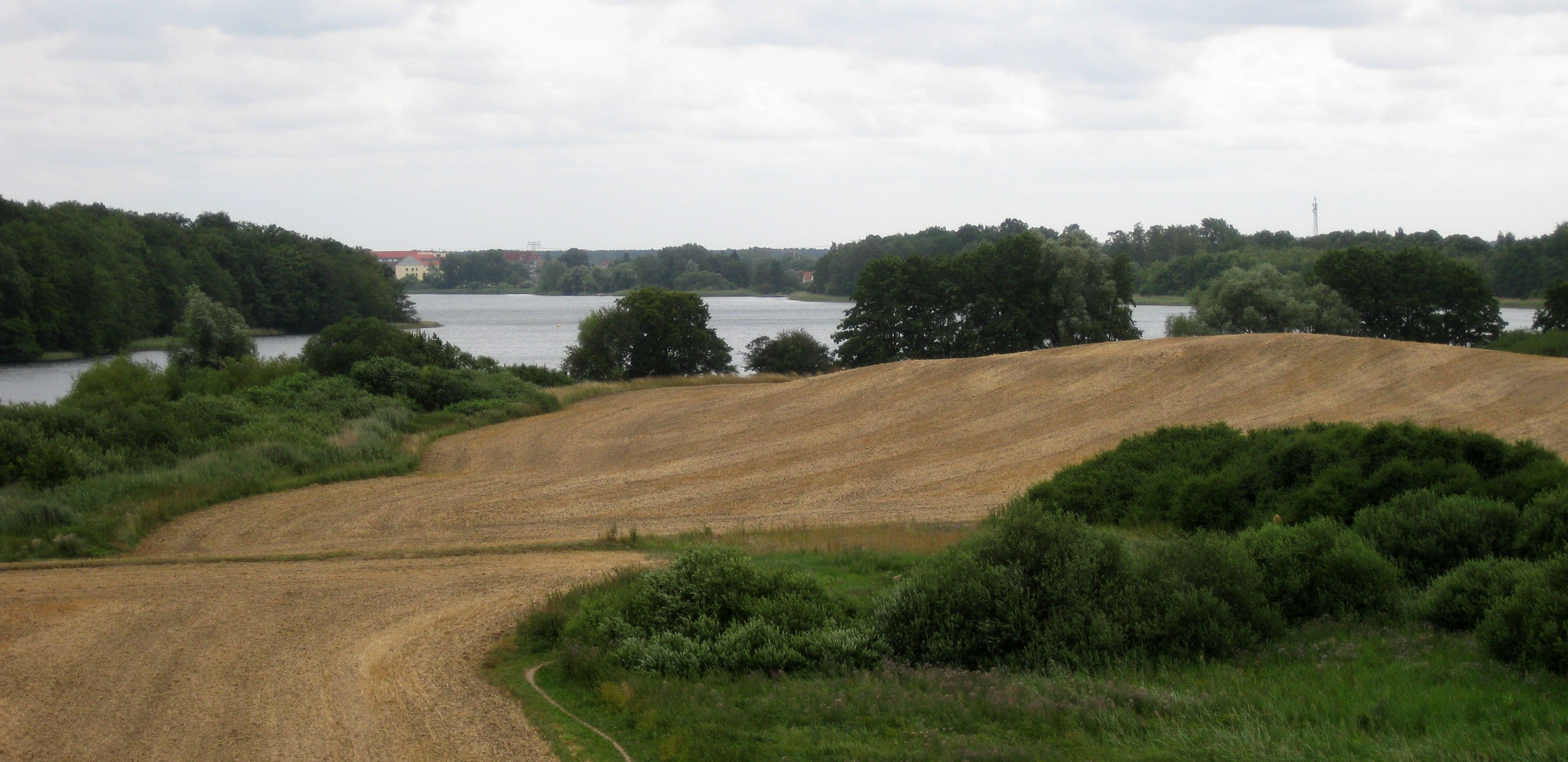

- Location within Mecklenburg-Vorpommern
- Location: Mecklenburgische Seenplatte district, eastern Germany
- Coordinates: 53°31′40″N 12°41′30″E
- Primary inflows: town ditch from the Falkenhäger See, Melzer See
- Primary outflows: Beke via the Herrensee to the Binnenmüritz
- Surface area: 1.41 km^{2} (0.54 sq mi)
- Average depth: 9.63 m (31.6 ft)
- Max. depth: 23.6 m (77 ft)
- Surface elevation: 63.0 m (206.7 ft)
- Settlements: Waren (Müritz)

The Tiefwarensee is a lake on the northeastern perimeter of the town of Waren (Müritz) in the district of Mecklenburgische Seenplatte in the German state of Mecklenburg-Western Pomerania. The lake is separated from the Binnenmüritz to the southwest by a 300 metre wide isthmus. The lake is a glacial tunnel valley lake nestling in an ice-age formed meltwater channel, that runs into Lake Müritz from the north. It has one sizeable bay on its southern shore. It is roughly 2,600 metres long and 780 metres wide. Waren's town centre lies on the southern shore of the lake. The lake thus plays a central role as a recreation area for Waren. For example, there is a canoe and boat hire service on the lake and fishing is also allowed. The Tiefwarensee belongs to the Torgelower See nature reserve, and its northeastern shore is part of the Ostufer Tiefwaren – Falkenhäger Bruch Nature Reserve. Power boats and windsurfing are not permitted. The ten-kilometre-long Tiefwarensee Ice Age Trail runs around the lake. It may be negotiated on foot or by bicycle..

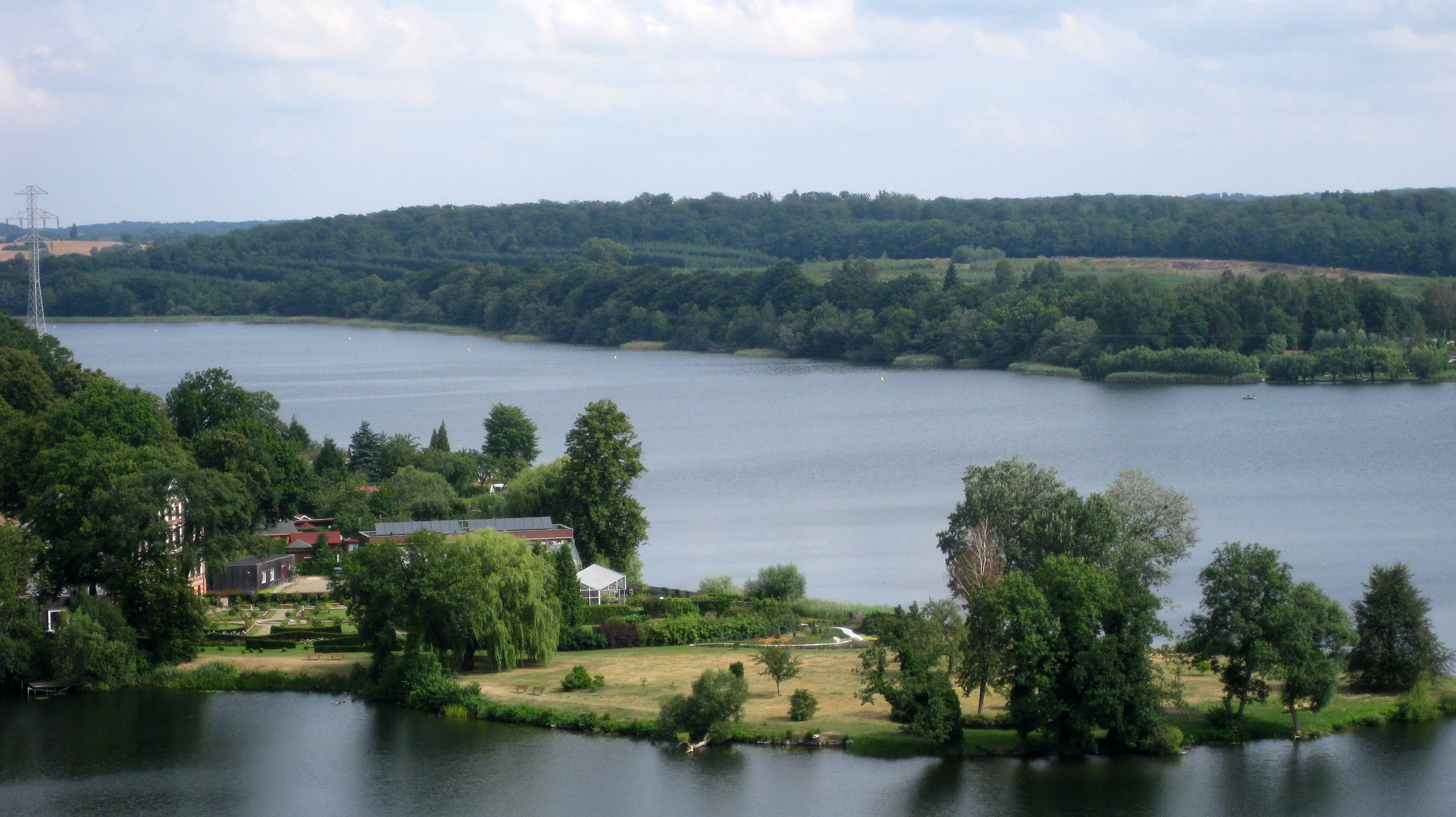
View of the Tiefwarensee from the tower of St. Mary's Church in Waren

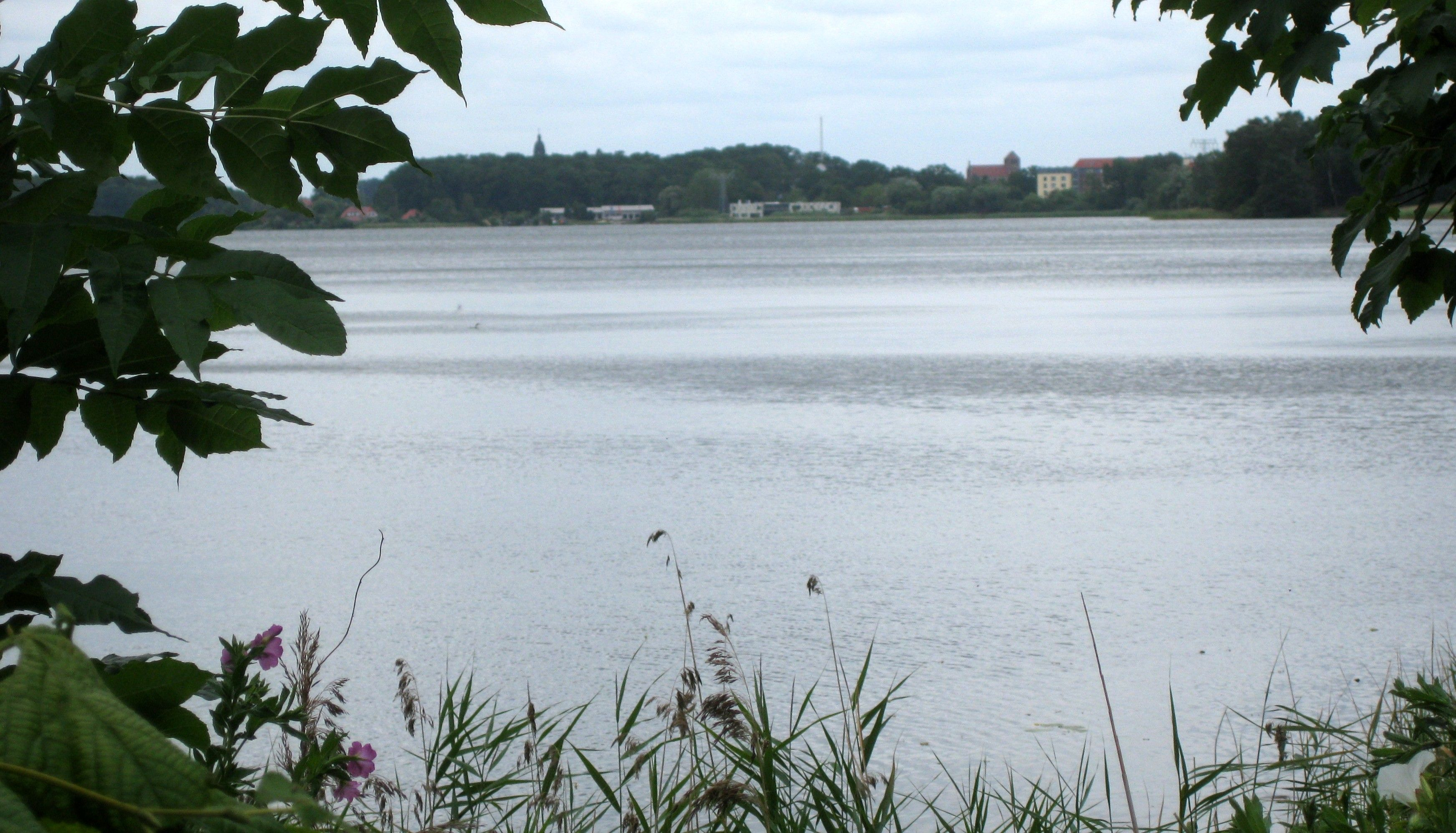
View over the Tiefwarensee to Waren from the Amsee Clinic northwest
