= Tiefwarensee Ice Age Trail =

The Tiefwarensee Ice Age Trail (German: Eiszeitlehrpfad Tiefwarensee) runs around the Tiefwarensee lake on the northeastern perimeter of the town of Waren (Müritz) in the district of Mecklenburgische Seenplatte in the German state of Mecklenburg-Western Pomerania. The ten-kilometre-long path may be negotiated on foot or by bicycle. It is element D8 of the Mecklenburg Ice Age Landscape Geopark (Geopark Mecklenburgische Eiszeitlandschaft).

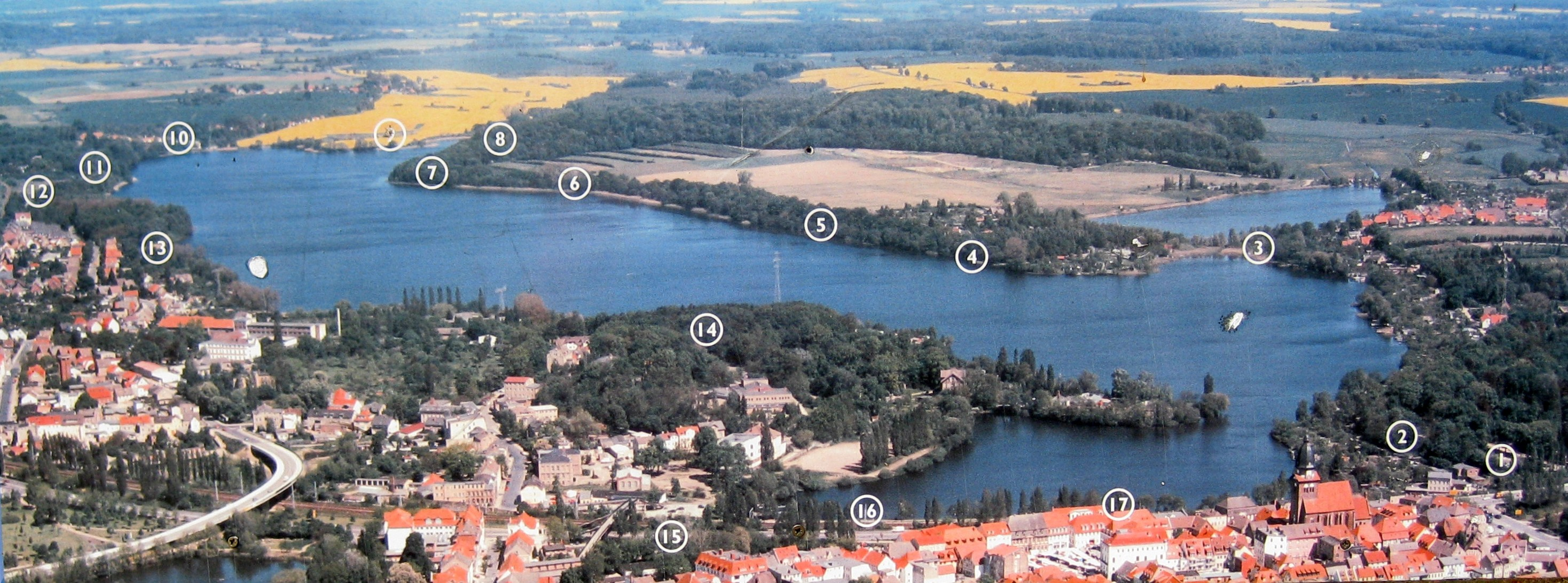
Overview of the Tiefwarensee Ice Age Trail

== Trail ==
Lake Müritz and the Tiefwarensee, like the rest of the Mecklenburg Lake District, were shaped by the last ice age. The various stages can be viewed here as if in a model of the region. "With the geopark project we want to make this natural geological heritage much more accessible to the public than hitherto and to make it a useful element of the region's touristic development", according to the Geopark's internet site.

== Stations on the trail ==
According to the overview map there are 17 stations with information boards:

1. The information boards begin at the cemetery (Friedhof) car park.
2. Stüde Ice House: Blocks of ice were sawn from the Tiefwarensee in winter, stored in an ice cellar and taken away during the course of the year for use in the fisheries and breweries. The roof of the cellar offers a view of the lake.
3. Hohlweg - Werderweg crosstracks: at this spot there was a pre-Roman Iron Age settlement. There are also traces of a sacrificial altar on which cattle were sacrificed. The bridge here runs over the meltwater tributary from the Melzer See to the Tiefwarensee.

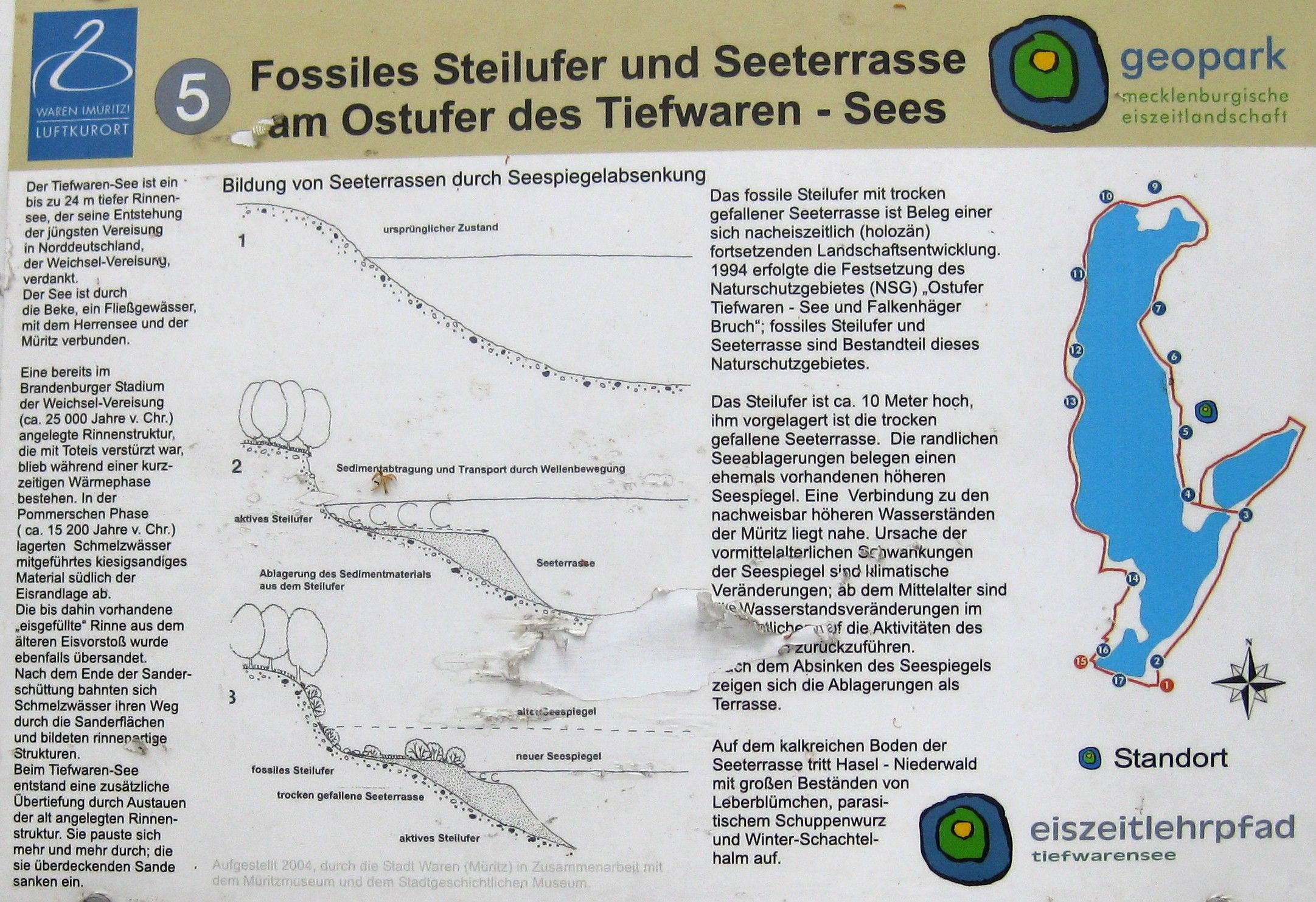
Information board about shore terraces

4. Lakeshore Terrace after the Werder-Siedlung: In this part of the Ostufer Tiefwaren – Falkenhäger Bruch Nature Reserve there are species-rich wet woodlands and a hazel coppice as well as a beech wood.

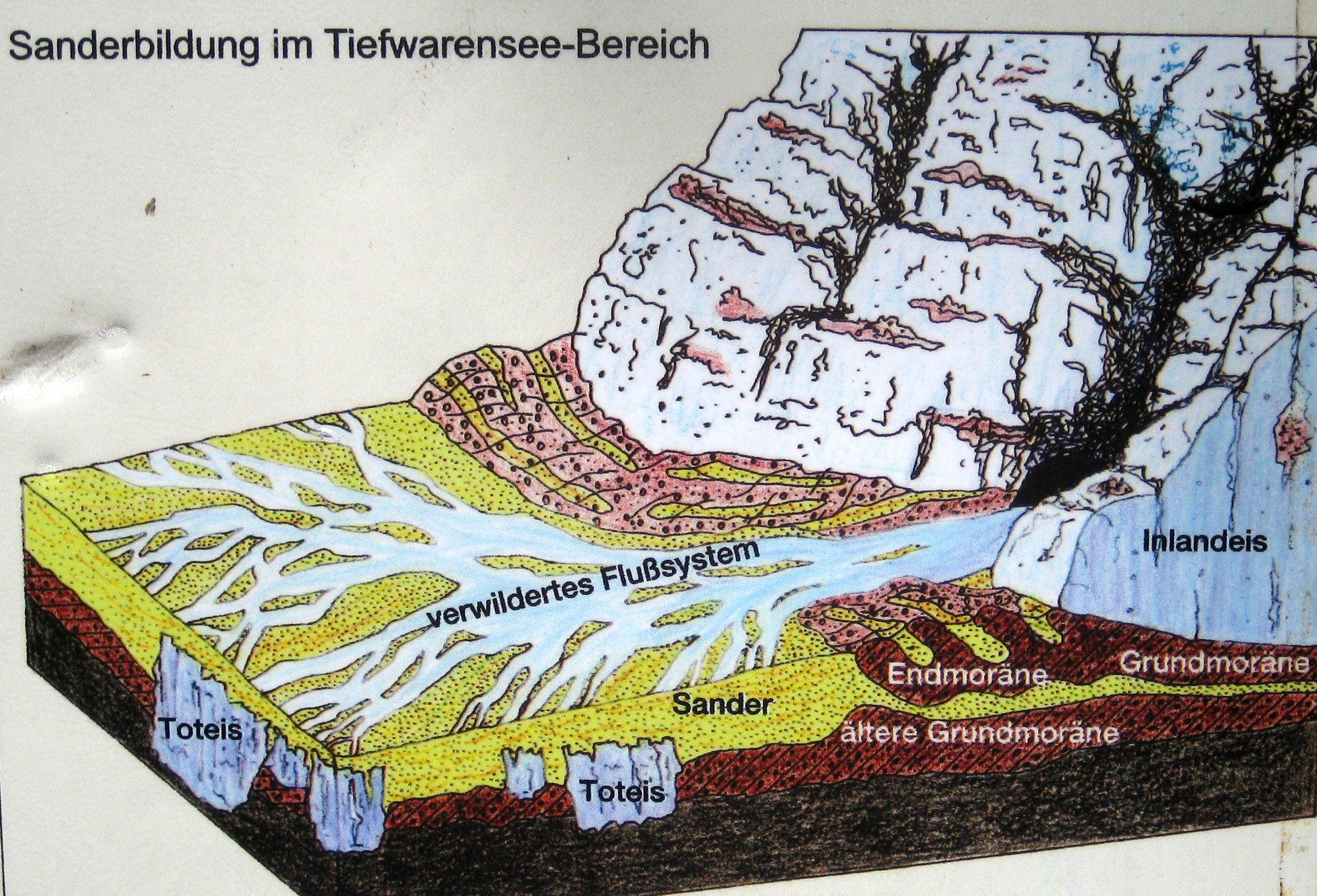
Information board on sandur formation

6. dead ice
7. sandur
8. glacial erratics

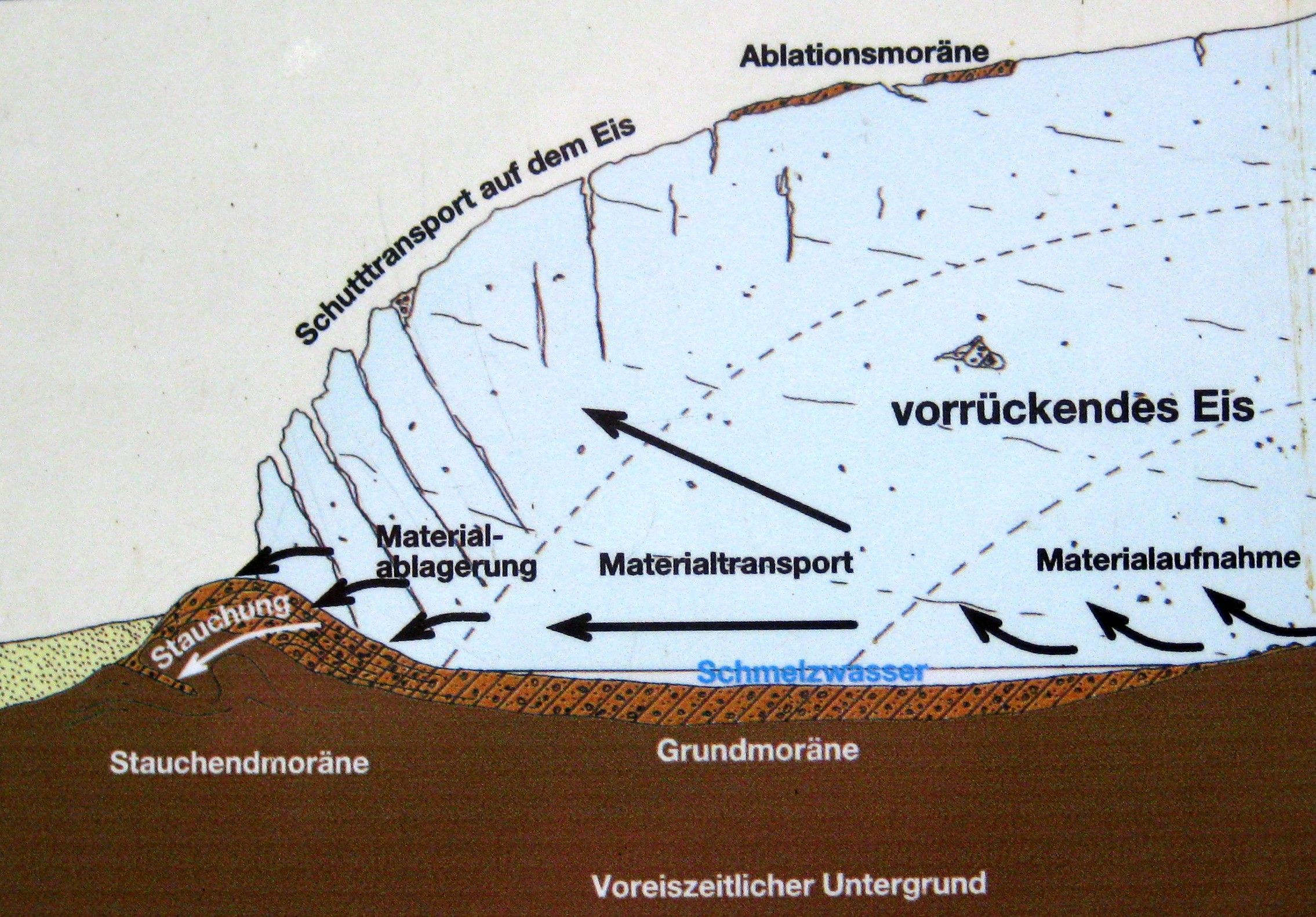
Information board on the formation of moraines in the Tiefwarensee region

7. glacial till
8. Geschiebemergel
9. silt
10. Schluff
11. ground moraine
12. Grundmoräne
13. ablation moraine
14. Ablationsmoräne
15. push moraine
16. Stauchendmoräne
17. recessional or deposited end moraines
18. Satzendmoräne
19. push moraines
20. Stauchendmoräne
21. Wolfsschlucht ("Wolf Gorge"): part of the ice age terminal moraine ridge with an imposing and species-rich beech wood. This is a Ratskamp (a plot of land whose income went to the Waren town council). The name Wolfsschlucht was probably coined during the Romantic period (19th century).

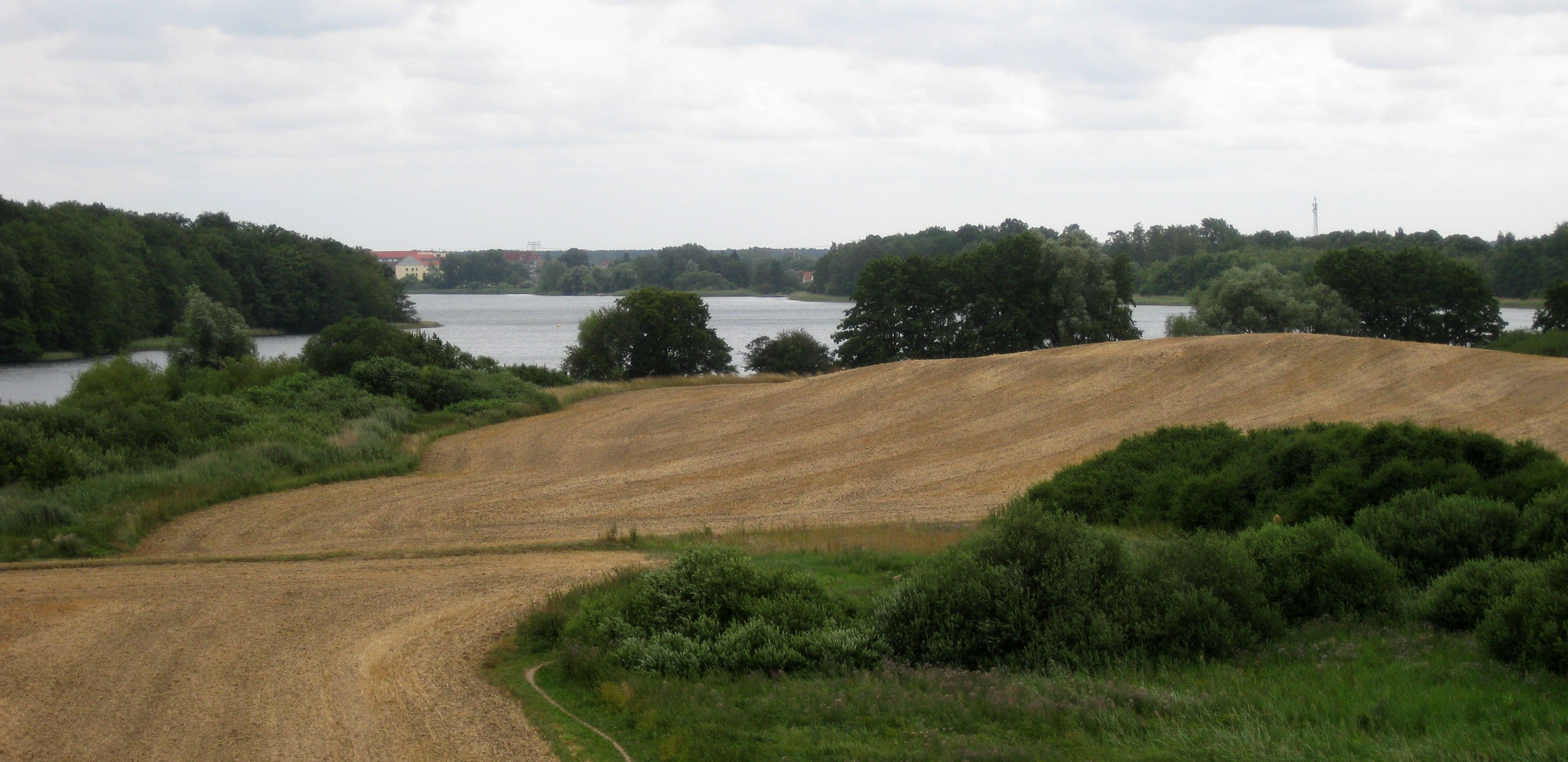
View from the observation tower over the moraine landscape to the Tiefwarensee

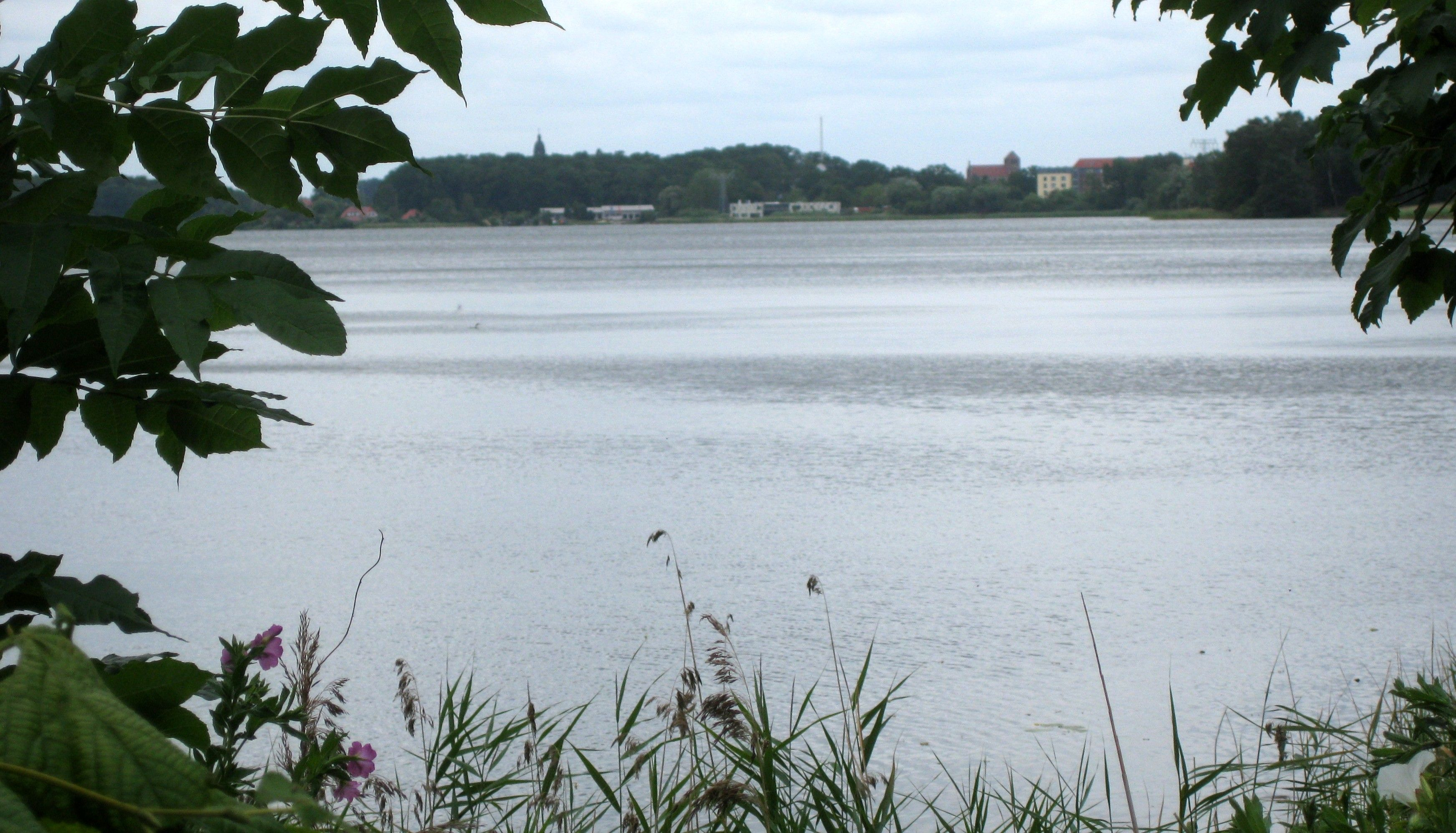
View of the lake from the Amsee Clinic looking towards Waren

10. Warener Buchen ("Waren Beeches"): The beech trees here are on a terminal moraine ridge on the edge of the Tiefwarensee.
11. Pommersche Wiese ("Pomeranian Meadow"): Here there are rare plants including orchids.
12. Bungenberg ("Bungen Hill"): fisherman used to dry their Bungen (= weirs made of wattle) on this hill .
13. Mühlenberg ("Mill Hill"): several windmills used to stand here, hence the name. Today it is the site of folk festivals and the open-air stage.
14. Kegelbahn car park: this is also a good place to leave the car and start the circular walk.
15. Boat hire: boats may be hired here for those who want to see the ice age landscape from the waters of the Tiefwarensee.
16. Promenade – southern shore of the Tiefwarensee: From the heights of the promenade there is a panoramic view from the south over the Tiefwarensee.

== Maps ==
- Geological map of the Mecklenburg Lake District Ice Age Route (pdf file; 2.1 MB)

== Literature ==
- On the internet site of the Ice Age Geopark there is a comprehensive list of current literature under the point "Publikationen"
