= Waupacksee =

Lake in Germany

- Location within Mecklenburg-Vorpommern
- Location: Mecklenburgische Seenplatte district, eastern Germany
- Coordinates: 53°30′20″N 12°42′55″E
- Primary outflows: ditch to the Feisneck
- Surface area: 0.068 km^{2} (0.026 sq mi)
- Surface elevation: 62.5 m (205 ft)

The Waupacksee is a lake on the southeastern edge of the town of Waren (Müritz) in the district of Mecklenburgische Seenplatte in the German state of Mecklenburg-Western Pomerania. The lake is 62.5 m above sea level (NHN), it has an area of 6.8 hectares and measures 300 metres by 270 metres. Its only headstream is a ditch from the meadows to the north, a ditch also carries its waters away to the Feisneck which in turn empties into the Müritz. The lake is mostly surrounded by meadows, only the eastern shore has a row of bushes. The shore is covered in reeds so the only access to the lake is from private land on the western shore. A high-tension power line crosses the northern part of the lake.
