= Nadine Julitz =

German politician (born 1990)

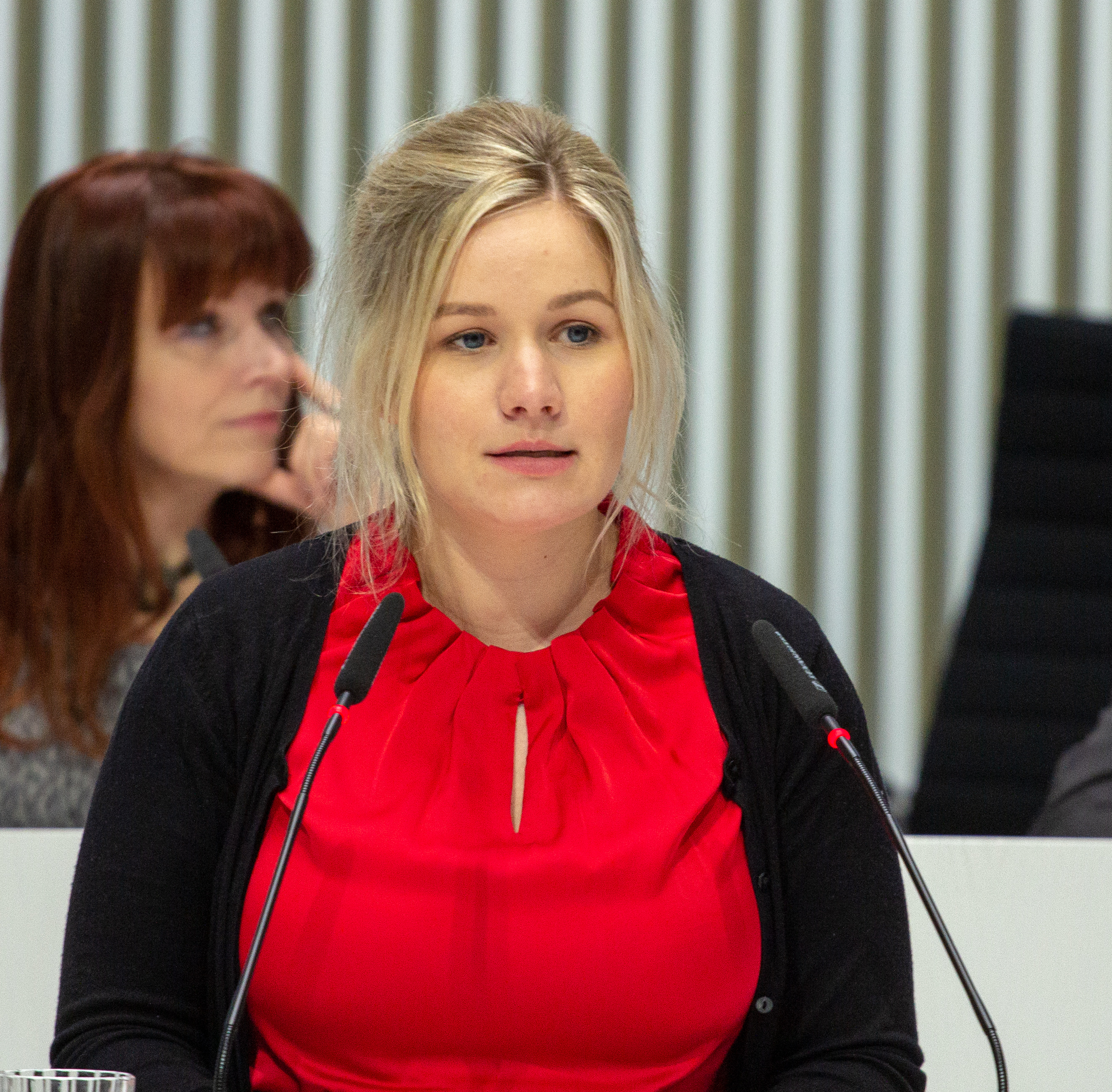
- Julitz in 2019

Member of the Landtag of Mecklenburg-Vorpommern
- Incumbent
- Assumed office 4 October 2016
- Preceded by: Rudolf Borchert
- Constituency: Mecklenburgische Seenplatte III

Personal details
- Born: 4 July 1990 (age 35) Waren (Müritz)
- Party: Social Democratic Party (since 2011)

Nadine Julitz (born 4 July 1990 in Waren) is a German politician serving as a member of the Landtag of Mecklenburg-Vorpommern since 2016. She has served as chairwoman of the Social Democratic Party in Waren since 2016.
