= Waren Town Hall =

Coordinates: 53°30′50″N 12°41′22″E

The New Town Hall in Waren was inaugurated in 1862. It is located in the town centre of Waren in Mecklenburg, Germany, on the market square (Marktplatz) near Sain Mary's Church.

== Chronology ==
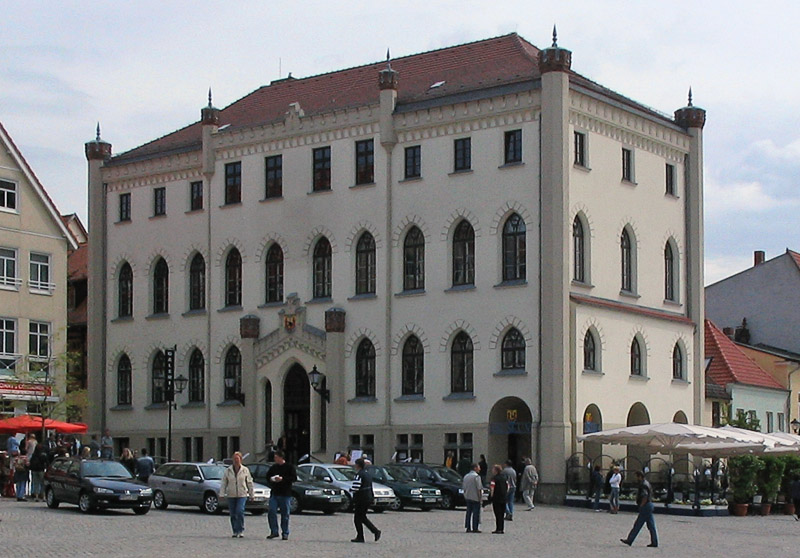
Waren: the New Town Hall

Originally the town was sited around Saint George's Church, built around 1273. From 1292, Waren is recorded as a civitas (which meant it had town rights) and from 1331 as an oppidum (small town).

The first town hall was on the old market square - today: Alter Markt 14 - from the early 15th century. The Old Town Hall was a two-storey brick building with arcades on its eastern gable, which acted as a Gerichtslaube.

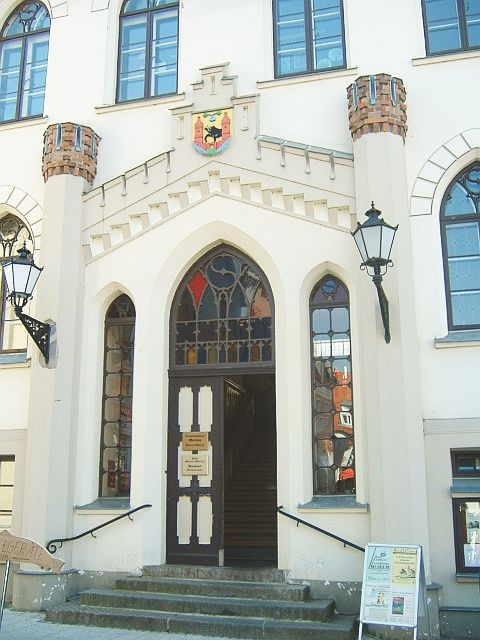
Town hall entrance with coat of arms

Shortly thereafter the New Town (Neustadt) was established which was united with the Old Town (Altstadt) around 1325. In the centre of the two settlements, on the new market square (Neuer Markt), which was now the central point, the second town hall was built.

In 1699, after the last town fire, the town had to be almost entirely rebuilt.

The third, three-storey, New Town Hall (Neues Rathaus) was built from 1791 to 1797 in a historicist tudor style. The corners of the plastered building were emphasised with slender, turret-like columns. The surrounding crenellations (Zinnenkranz) runs around the base of the hip roof and is interrupted on the longer sides of the building by two additional turrets. There is an open arcade on the right-hand side.

In 1857 there was a considerable extension of the town hall. When the town was bombarded in 1920 during the Kapp Putsch, the town hall was also hit. The shell hole on the rear of the building may still be seen today.

The New Town Hall was renovated around 1997 as part of a general urban regeneration project. The town council is located today on the western edge of the Old Town.

== Literature ==
- Hartmut Brun, Theodor Müller: Rathäuser in Mecklenburg-Vorpommern; Hinstorff-Verlag, Rostock, 2001, ISBN 3-356-00912-5
- Georg Dehio: Handbuch der deutschen Kunstdenkmäler - Mecklenburg; Deutscher Kunstverlag, Munich and Berlin, 1980
