= Melzer See (Waren) =

Lake in Mecklenburg-Vorpommern, Germany

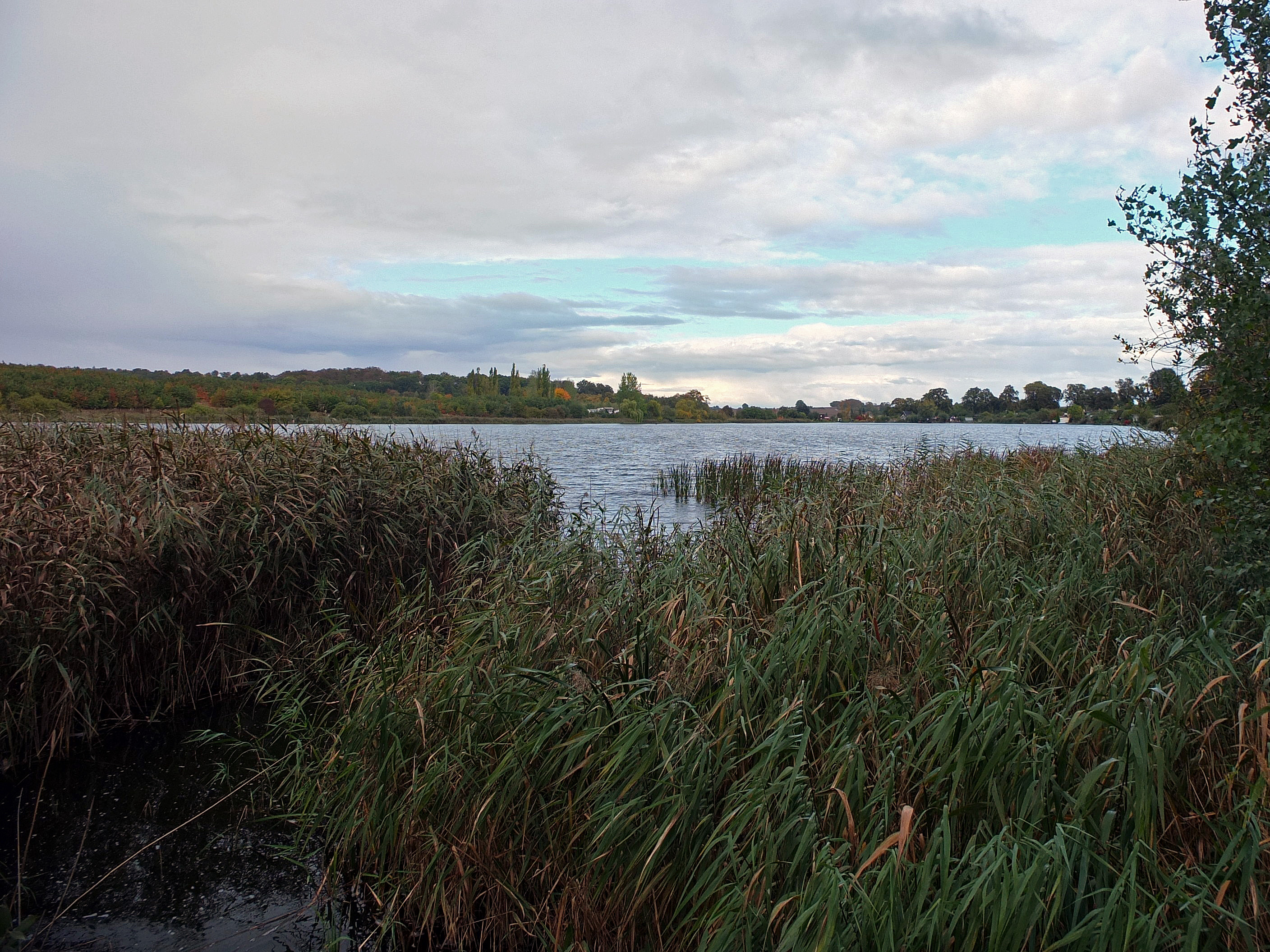

- Location within Mecklenburg-Vorpommern
- Location: Waren, Mecklenburgische Seenplatte, Mecklenburg-Vorpommern
- Coordinates: 53°31′38″N 12°42′12″E
- Basin countries: Germany
- Surface area: 0.129 km^{2} (0.050 sq mi)
- Surface elevation: 63 m (207 ft)
- Settlements: Waren (Müritz)

The Melzer See or Melzersee is a lake at Waren in Mecklenburgische Seenplatte, Mecklenburg-Vorpommern, Germany.

The Melzer See lies on the northeastern perimeter of the town of Waren (Müritz). It has an area of 12.9 hectares and lies at an elevation of 63 m above sea level (NHN). Its maximum dimensions are 670 by 260 metres. It is fed from the ditches of the nearby Lehmkuhlenbruch and its waters exit through a short ditch into the Tiefwarensee, from which it is only separated by a narrow isthmus and small road. The location between two lakes was the occasion for the origin of the name of the Waren quarter of Werdersiedlung.

Whilst small gardens are ranged along its southern shore, the Melzer See is bordered to the northwest by meadowland. It lies entirely within the protected area of the Torgelower See. Visitors can walk around the lake on a two-kilometre-long footpath. The Ice Age Trail along theTiefwarensee also runs past the Melzer See.
