= Melzer See (Melz) =

Lake in Germany

- Location within Mecklenburg-Vorpommern
- Location: Mecklenburgische Seenplatte, Mecklenburg-Vorpommern
- Coordinates: 53°18′06″N 12°37′24″E
- Primary inflows: Elde
- Primary outflows: Elde
- Basin countries: Germany
- Surface area: 0.291 km^{2} (0.112 sq mi)
- Surface elevation: 63.1 m (207 ft)

Melzer See is a lake in the Mecklenburgische Seenplatte district in Mecklenburg-Vorpommern, Germany. At an elevation of 63.1 m, its surface area is 0.291 km².
