= Torgelower See =

Lake in Mecklenburg-Vorpommern, Germany

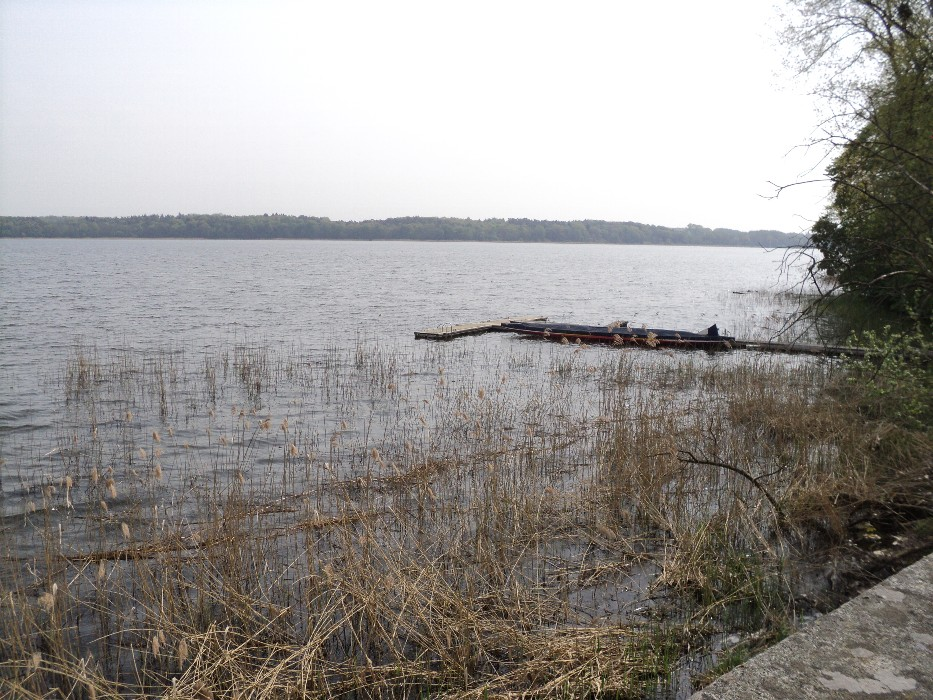

- Location within Mecklenburg-Vorpommern
- Location: Mecklenburgische Seenplatte, Mecklenburg-Vorpommern
- Coordinates: 53°33′47.35″N 12°47′12.17″E
- Primary inflows: Ostpeene
- Primary outflows: Ostpeene
- Basin countries: Germany
- Max. length: 3.1 km (1.9 mi)
- Max. width: 1.6 km (0.99 mi)
- Surface area: 3.57 km^{2} (1.38 sq mi)
- Max. depth: 8 m (26 ft)
- Surface elevation: 38.6 m (127 ft)

Torgelower See is a lake in the Mecklenburgische Seenplatte district in Mecklenburg-Vorpommern, Germany. At an elevation of 38.6m, its surface area is 3.57 km².
