= Waren (Müritz) =

Town in Mecklenburg-Vorpommern, Germany

- Town
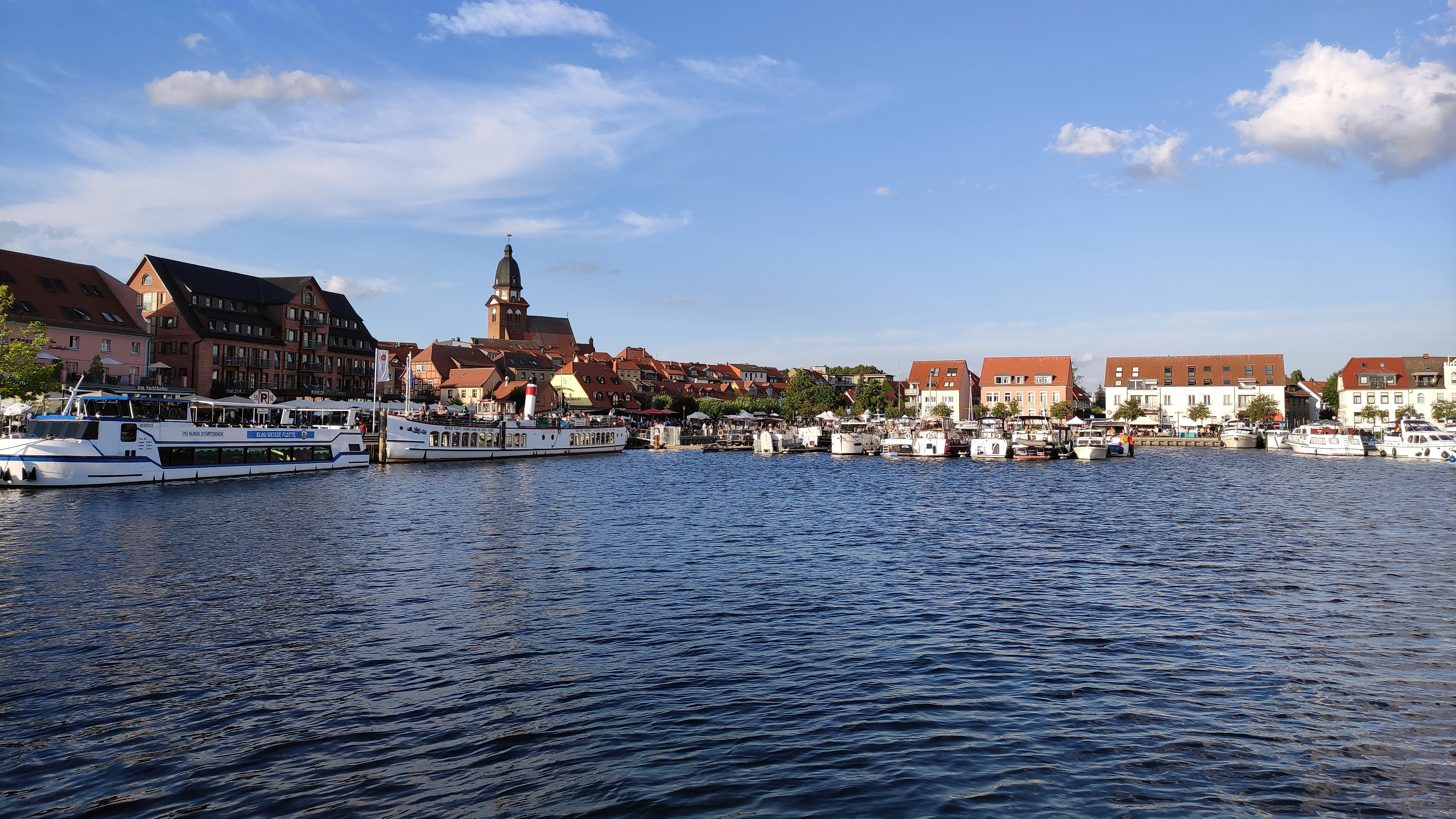
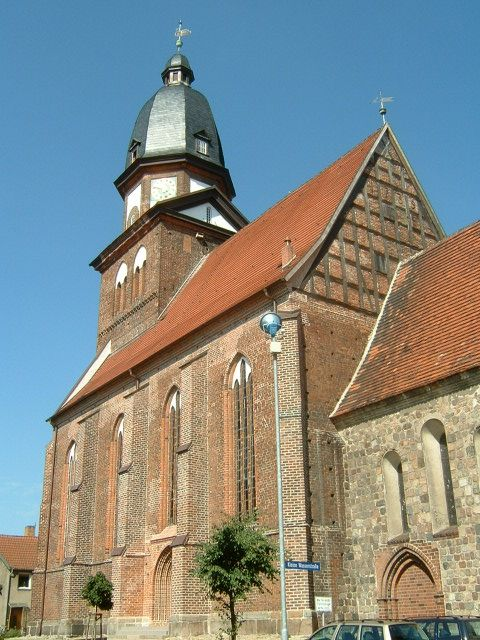
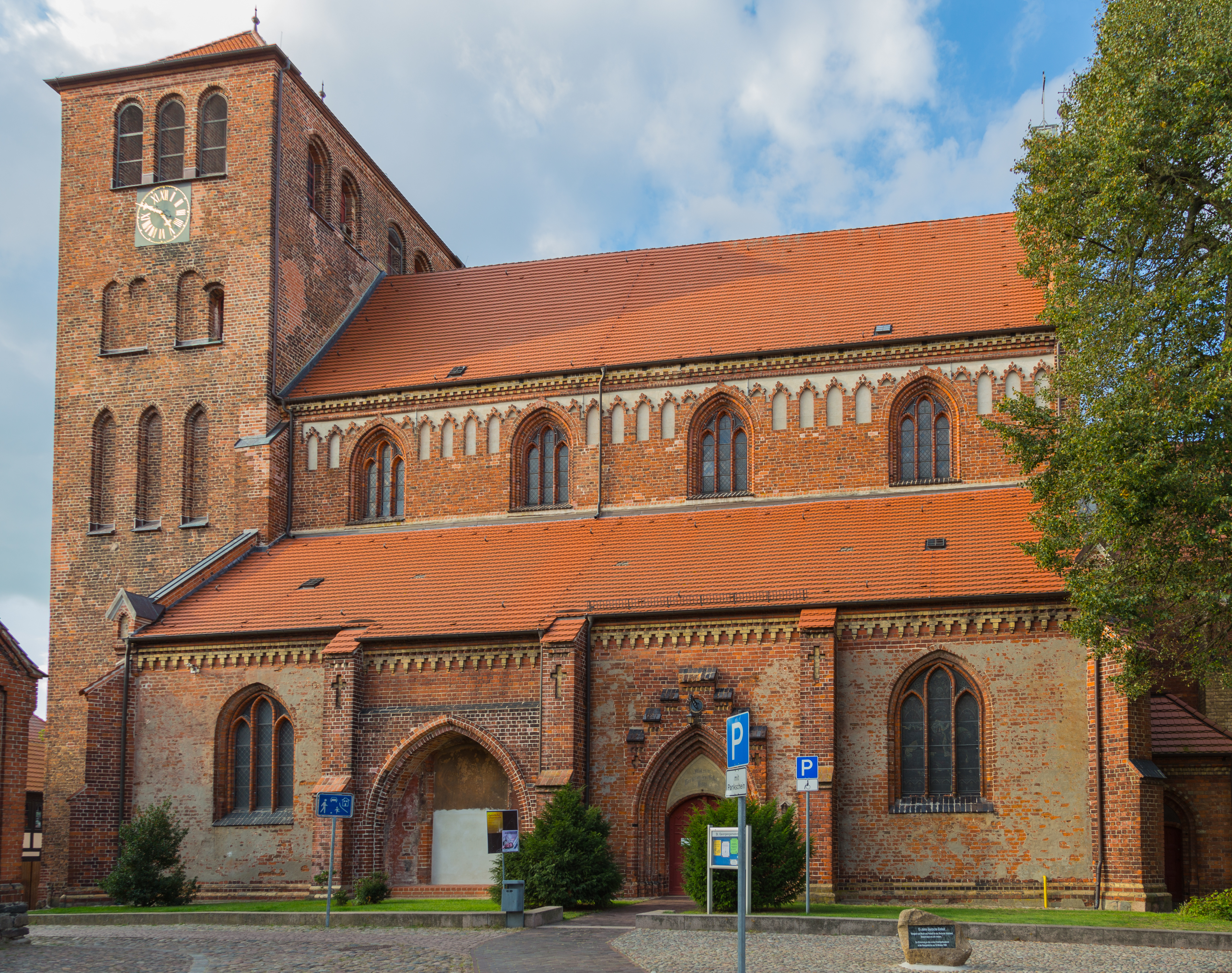
- Harbour St. Mary's Church St. George's Church

- Coat of arms

- Location of Waren within Mecklenburgische Seenplatte district
- Interactive map of Waren
- Location within Germany Location within Mecklenburg-Vorpommern
- Coordinates: 53°31′N 12°41′E
- Country: Germany
- State: Mecklenburg-Vorpommern
- District: Mecklenburgische Seenplatte

Government
  - Mayor: Norbert Möller (SPD)

Area
  - Total: 159.46 km^{2} (61.57 sq mi)
- Elevation: 73 m (240 ft)

Population (2025-12-31)
  - Total: 20,211
  - Density: 126.75/km^{2} (328.27/sq mi)
- Time zone: UTC+01:00 (CET)
  - Summer (DST): UTC+02:00 (CEST)
- Postal codes: 17192
- Dialling codes: 03991
- Vehicle registration: MSE, AT, DM, MC, MST, MÜR, NZ, RM, WRN
- Website: www.waren-mueritz.de

Waren (Müritz) (German pronunciation: [ˈvaːʁən]; also Waren an der Müritz) is a town and climatic spa in the state of Mecklenburg-Vorpommern, in north-eastern Germany. It was the capital of the former district of Müritz (Kreis Müritz) until the district reform of 2011. It is situated at the northern end of Lake Müritz, approximately 40 kilometres west of Neubrandenburg. Waren is home to the offices of the sub-district (Amt) of Seenlandschaft Waren, although the town itself is independent of any Amt. Its borough is the second largest in Mecklenburg-Vorpommern by area.

== Geography ==
Waren lies on Lake Müritz, the largest inland lake lying entirely within Germany, which has an area of 117 square kilometres (45 square miles). It also lies on the shores of several smaller lakes: the Kölpinsee, the Tiefwarensee, the Feisnecksee, the Melzer See and the Waupacksee. In the middle of the town is the Herrensee.

=== Subdivisions ===
The town's borough includes the town of Waren (Müritz) itself, as well as the villages of Warenshof, Alt Falkenhagen, Neu Falkenhagen, Jägerhof, Rügeband, Schwenzin, Eldenholz and Eldenburg.

The town is divided into the following quarters:

- Papenberg
- Altstadt
- Waren-Ost
- Waren-Nord
- Waren-West
- Nesselberg
- Ecktannen
- Kamerun
- Werdersiedlung

== History ==
=== First records and name ===
Waren (along with Gnoien, Bützow and several other settlements that cannot be placed) was mentioned as early as 150 A.D. by the Alexandrine geographer, Claudius Ptolemy, (as Virunum) and is thus one of the first places on the territory of the modern-day state of Mecklenburg-Western Pomerania to be recorded. As such, it is featured as a settlement of the Rugii in the historical strategy game Total War: Rome II (as Virunium).

The name of the town could be derived from the Slavic language and mean place of crows or ravens.

Its name may also come from the Germanic tribe of Warini. The name was formerly spelt Wahren, Warne or, in Latin, Warnae. In 1914 the place was given the official name Waren (Müritz) (Müritz, the name of the lake, comes from the Wend word Morcze = German: Meer = "sea").

=== Middle Ages ===
The medieval town was founded around 1260 on the trade route from Stargard Land to Wismar near a castle and a Slavic village by settlers from Westphalia. The original town sprang up around St. George's Church, on the Old Market (Alter Markt) in the Old Town (Altstadt). St. George's was first mentioned in 1273. On Alter Markt (today: Alter Markt 14) was the first town hall. A little later the New Town (Neustadt) was founded around St. Mary's Church, which was merged in 1325 with the Old Town. Its new centre was New Market (Neue Markt), which joined the Old and New Towns. A town wall ran around the town.

In 1292 Waren was described for the first time as civitas (which meant it now had town rights) and from 1331 as oppidum (small town). In 1306 the town was given fishing rights on Lake Müritz.

From 1347 to 1425 Waren was the Residenz of a branch of the House of Werle who were part of the Obodrites family. The Werle castle probably stood south of St. Mary's on Burgstraße.

=== Early modern period ===
As a result of major fires in 1568, 1637, 1671, 1673 and 1699 and the Thirty Years' War the town was frequently devastated.

The first town hall stood on the Alter Markt and then in the middle on the Neuer Markt. The present town hall on Neuer Markt was built from 1791 to 1797 and extended in 1857.

=== 19th century ===
In 1806 there was fighting in the town and surrounding area between Blücher and the French.

The canalisation of the River Elde (1798–1803 and 1831–1837) and the construction of the Bolter Canal (1831–1837) resulted in an economic boom in the town. In 1839 a vocational school was founded. In 1845 the first public baths opened on the Müritz. In 1862 the Birkenstädt Brewery was founded in present-day Müritzstraße by the town harbour; the brewery closed again in 1920. In 1869 the grammar school (Gymnasium) opened, initially as a progymnasium, (today it is the Richard Wossidlo Grammar School). In 1848–49 the country road (Chaussee) from Malchow via Waren to Neubrandenburg was built and, with its connexion to the Waren–Malchin railway in 1879, Waren developed into a transport hub. In 1885 the Mecklenburg Southern Railway from Parchim via Waren to Neubrandenburg was opened and, in 1886, the Lloyd Railway from Neustrelitz via Waren to Rostock followed suit.

Waren in the early 20th century

=== 1920s ===
In 1920 the cavalry captain, Rittmeister Stephan von le Fort (1884–1953) from Gut Boek, gathered a group of Freikorps fighters around him and imposed a state of siege on the town of Waren during the Kapp Putsch on 17 March 1920. On 18 March, he and his cousin, Reichswehr lieutenant Peter Alexander von le Fort, gave orders for a cannon and three machine guns to open fire on the town from Gallows Hill (Galgenberg), resulting in five deaths and eleven seriously wounded. After the putsch was suppressed, both men fled to Munich and Austria and the family seat was seized by the Free State of Mecklenburg-Strelitz. At the back of Waren Town Hall, a bullet hole can still be seen today as reminder of the affair.

In 1920 the town began raising a spa tax. On 3 December 1920 Waren became the county town of the county of Waren. On 11 November 1925 the sub-district (Amt) of Röbel was incorporated into the Amt of Waren. In 1925 the first electric lights were lit. In the same year Waren Harbour reached its economic peak – 188 ships arrived and 208 departed handling a total of 22,330 tonnes of goods.

In 1927 the following big firms were operating in the town: the Naschkatze dairy, the Piechatzek engineering works and iron foundry (today Mecklenburger Metallguss), the Steinborn steam-powered sawmill and the Thiele und Buggisch mill. There was also a milk exporting concern, Natura, a potato factory, the Strubelt steam-powered sawmill, a gas works and a fish-processing plant.

There were 14 construction businesses, a roofing felt company, five mills, two cement factories and the Rosengarten Fishery.

The Roman Catholic Church was consecrated on 15 September 1929.

=== Nazi era ===
At the district elections on 1 November 1931, the Nazis were the largest party. They filled the post of district chief executive (Amtshauptmann) on 1 April 1932 and mayor in December 1932. During the Nazi era, Jewish townsfolk were persecuted, expelled and murdered in concentration camps. The Jewish community, which had numbered 150 in the middle of the 19th century, had dwindled by April 1938 to nine. The old synagogue was sold in 1936 to a private owner, so that it was not destroyed by the Nazis. However, the Jewish cemetery was desecrated and destroyed in the November Pogrom of 1938. Since 1961 a memorial has commemorated it. In 1942 there were no Jews left in Waren.

Memorial to murdered prisoners of the Retzow-Waren camp

From 1936 the Dürener Metallwerke (suppliers to the military aircraft industry) established a plant in Waren, the Mecklenburgische Metallwarenfabrik Waren or Memefa, which belonged to the Quandt Group. Several thousand POWs, as well as men and women from the countries occupied by Germany, were used as forced labourers there, working sometimes in inhumane conditions.

To provide works housing for the German workforce, from 1936 to 1941, a new residential area, the Westsiedlung, was built. For this the Berlin architect, Günther Paul (1898–1976), designed multi-family houses (in Thomas-Mann-Straße, Friedrich-Engels-Platz and Clara Zetkin-Straße), semi-detached houses and the so-called foremen's homes. As a result, the population grew by more than 4,000. In Warenshof, a naval base (Marinenlager) was established as hutted camp for training the intelligence service of the Navy.

During the Second World War a naval hospital was set up in the Müritzhöhe spa centre. In addition, during the final months of the war, the primary school (Volksschule) on Denkmalstraße, the grammar school and the Warener Hof hotel became emergency wards. On 25 February 1945, the German-organised march of French prisoners of war from the Oflag II-B camp arrived in Waren, and afterwards some stayed until the capture of the town by Red Army. On 1 May 1945 the Red Army occupied the town without a fight.

=== Post-1945 ===
In October, Friedrich Dethloff (KPD) became the new mayor, by order of the Soviet military commander. The Soviet NKVD centre at Kietzstraße 10, the "House of Horrors", was known for its tough interrogation and torture. By the end of the year, over 6,000 refugees from the eastern territories had entered the town. By the spring of 1946, there was a typhus epidemic that claimed many victims. The facilities of the "Memefa" and the steam mill and Thiele Buggisch were dismantled as war reparations and sent to the Soviet Union. The Rostock to Neustrelitz railway and the sections of line from Malchow to Karow and Möllenhagen to Neubrandenburg were closed and the track removed.

In the 1970s, large parts of the historic old town were demolished; sacrificed for a large-scale new traffic system. This devastation resulted in a raising of awareness in Waren among many of the residents, especially for the preservation of the remaining, often centuries-old buildings of the Old Town. A citizen's movement "Save the Old Town" was established long before the Berlin Wall fell and the border re-opened and their work has contributed greatly to the charm of the town centre today.

A public meeting with East German Prime Minister Hans Modrow in Waren in 1990

During the Cold War, Waren was home to one of the four central nuclear missile depots of the Group of Soviet Forces in Germany.

In 1991, after German reunification, the historic town centre between Lake Müritz and the Tiefwarensee lake was renovated as part of an urban development programme. The town with its two churches, town hall, old and new markets and the stores has been improved. Since 1 May 1999 the town has been able to call itself a "state-approved health resort", but its target is to become a recognised saltwater health spa.

=== Population growth ===
(as a 31 December in each case)

Historical population

Year	Pop.	±% p.a.
1810	3,022	—
1850	5,258	+1.39%
1900	8,848	+1.05%
1910	9,182	+0.37%
1919	9,203	+0.03%
1925	10,363	+2.00%

Year	Pop.	±% p.a.
1933	11,622	+1.44%
1937	14,236	+5.20%
1939	15,538	+4.47%
1945^{*}	19,218	+3.61%
1950	20,594	+1.39%
1970	21,332	+0.18%

Year	Pop.	±% p.a.
1977	23,057	+1.12%
1983	24,101	+0.74%
1987	24,300	+0.21%
2004	21,637	−0.68%
2006	21,236	−0.93%
2013	20,940	−0.20%

^{*} 1 December

== Climate ==
Climate data for Waren (Müritz) (1991–2020 normals)
Month	Jan	Feb	Mar	Apr	May	Jun	Jul	Aug	Sep	Oct	Nov	Dec	Year
Mean daily maximum °C (°F)	2.8 (37.0)	4.4 (39.9)	8.1 (46.6)	14.2 (57.6)	18.9 (66.0)	22.2 (72.0)	24.3 (75.7)	23.9 (75.0)	19.6 (67.3)	13.5 (56.3)	7.8 (46.0)	4.3 (39.7)	13.7 (56.7)
Daily mean °C (°F)	0.8 (33.4)	1.5 (34.7)	4.1 (39.4)	9.1 (48.4)	13.6 (56.5)	16.8 (62.2)	19.0 (66.2)	18.6 (65.5)	14.9 (58.8)	9.8 (49.6)	5.3 (41.5)	2.4 (36.3)	9.7 (49.5)
Mean daily minimum °C (°F)	−1.7 (28.9)	−1.2 (29.8)	0.4 (32.7)	4.1 (39.4)	8.2 (46.8)	11.8 (53.2)	14.1 (57.4)	14.0 (57.2)	10.6 (51.1)	6.7 (44.1)	3.3 (37.9)	0.3 (32.5)	6.0 (42.8)
Average precipitation mm (inches)	53.0 (2.09)	35.0 (1.38)	39.3 (1.55)	28.1 (1.11)	45.9 (1.81)	63.0 (2.48)	76.7 (3.02)	56.7 (2.23)	49.6 (1.95)	51.0 (2.01)	43.2 (1.70)	46.5 (1.83)	601.7 (23.69)
Average precipitation days (≥ 1.0 mm)	18.3	14.6	13.9	11.4	13.1	13.6	14.4	14.6	12.9	15.4	16.5	18.7	177.6
Average relative humidity (%)	89.3	85.0	79.5	70.6	70.2	71.6	71.4	73.6	77.7	85.7	90.3	90.2	79.6
Mean monthly sunshine hours	44.2	73.3	135.2	213.3	238.1	244.7	237.6	218.3	177.7	106.8	54.0	35.0	1,782.7
Source: World Meteorological Organization

== Culture and places of interest ==
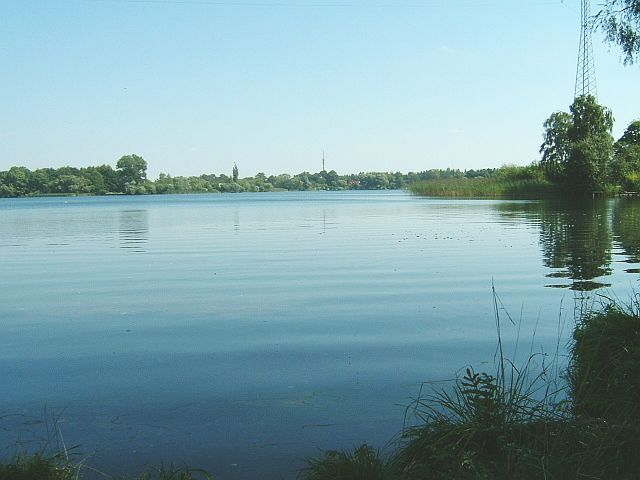
View across the Tiefwarensee

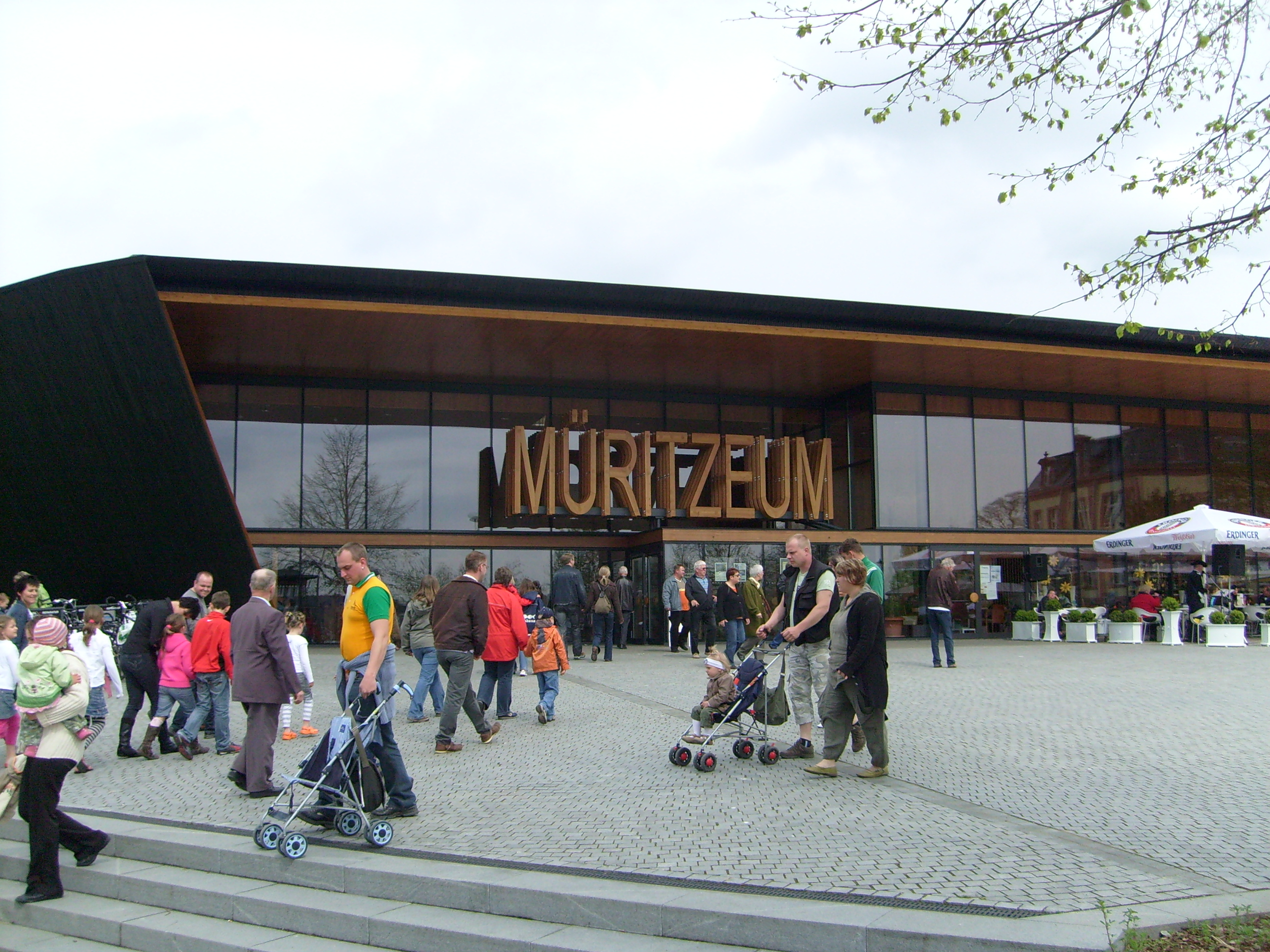
The Müritzeum on the Herrensee lake in Waren (Müritz)

There is a number of official parks around Waren, such as the Nossentiner/Schwinzer Heath Nature Park or the Müritz National Park. On the Damerower Werder, which belongs to the parish of Jabel, there is an enclosure of European Bison which is open to visitors.

In the historic town centre of Waren (Müritz) are many restaurants, cafés, bars and several shopping streets.

=== Müritzeum ===
The Müritzeum is the biggest freshwater aquarium for native fish species in Germany and has an interactive, multimedia exhibition of the attractions and features of the Müritz region and Müritz National Park. At the same time the Müritzeum acts as an information- and nature experience centre for the Mecklenburg Lake District as a whole. Over 40 species of fish from Mecklenburg-Western Pomerania may be seen.

=== Churches ===
Saint George Church

St. Mary Church

St. George's

St. George's Church dates to the early 14th century and is a three-aisled basilica with a four-bayed nave, that is covered by a cross-ribbed vaulted ceiling. The building is made of brick. The square West Tower is from 1414. In 1699 it was ravaged by fire, and was not rebuilt until the mid-19th century. The altar, pulpit and double rood loft (Doppelempore) were fashioned in the neogothic style. The altar portrays a crucifixion group with Mary, Mary Magdalene and John. It was carved by a Tyrolean carver. The parish of St. George has about 2,300 members.

St. Mary's

St. Mary's Church is a rectangular, single-aisled, brick building in the east of the Old Town. The so-called New Town (Neustadt) was founded around it. The West Tower with its very striking upper section was built in the early 14th century, the upper part itself dating to 1790–1972. The rectangular fieldstone chancel is made from the remains of the former castle chapel of Waren Castle which no longer exists but stood on what is now Große Burgstraße. This is dated to the beginning of the 13th century. The windows of the sacristy, in Romanesque style, have survived.

=== Other buildings ===
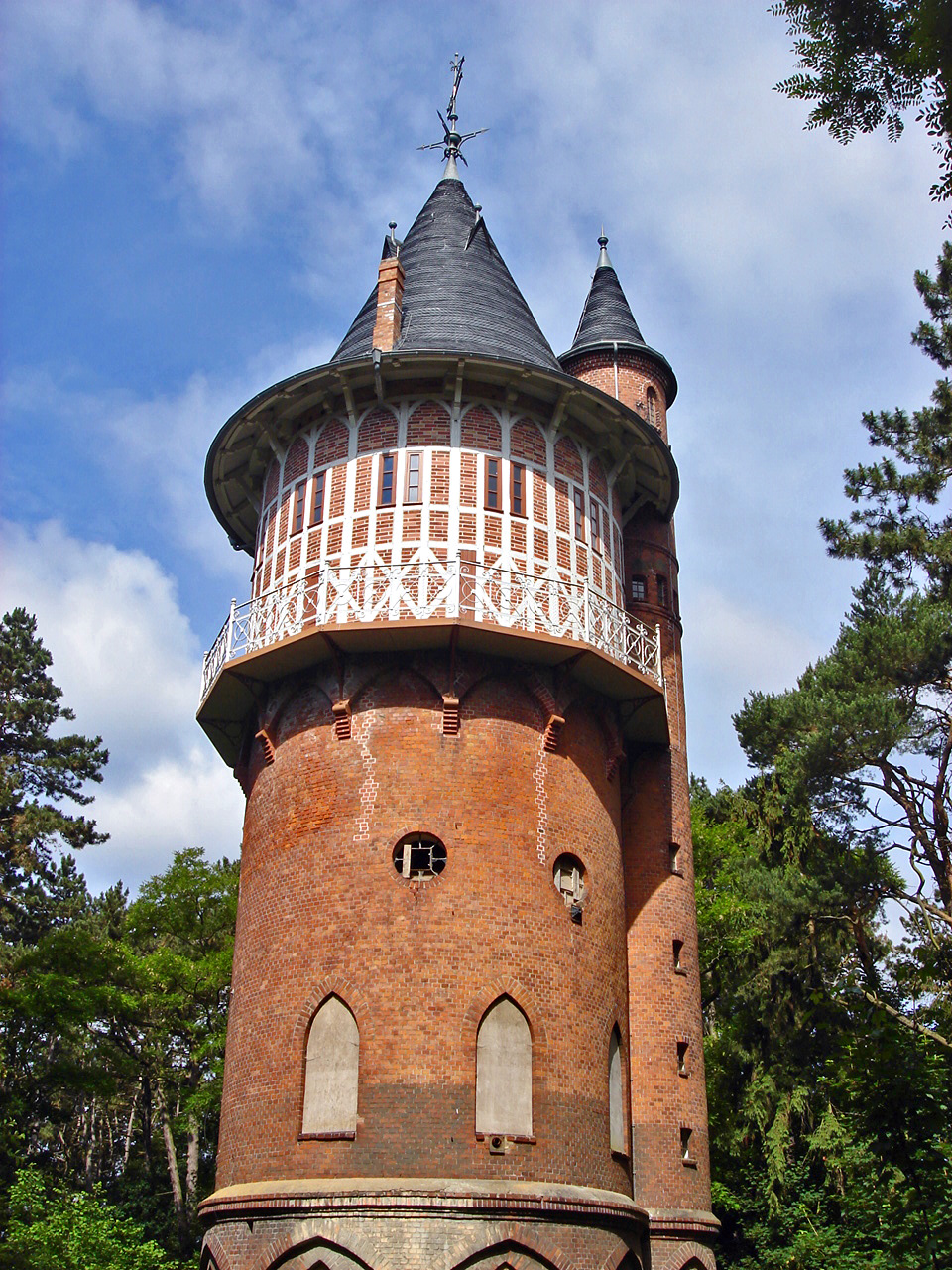
Water tower on the Nesselberg

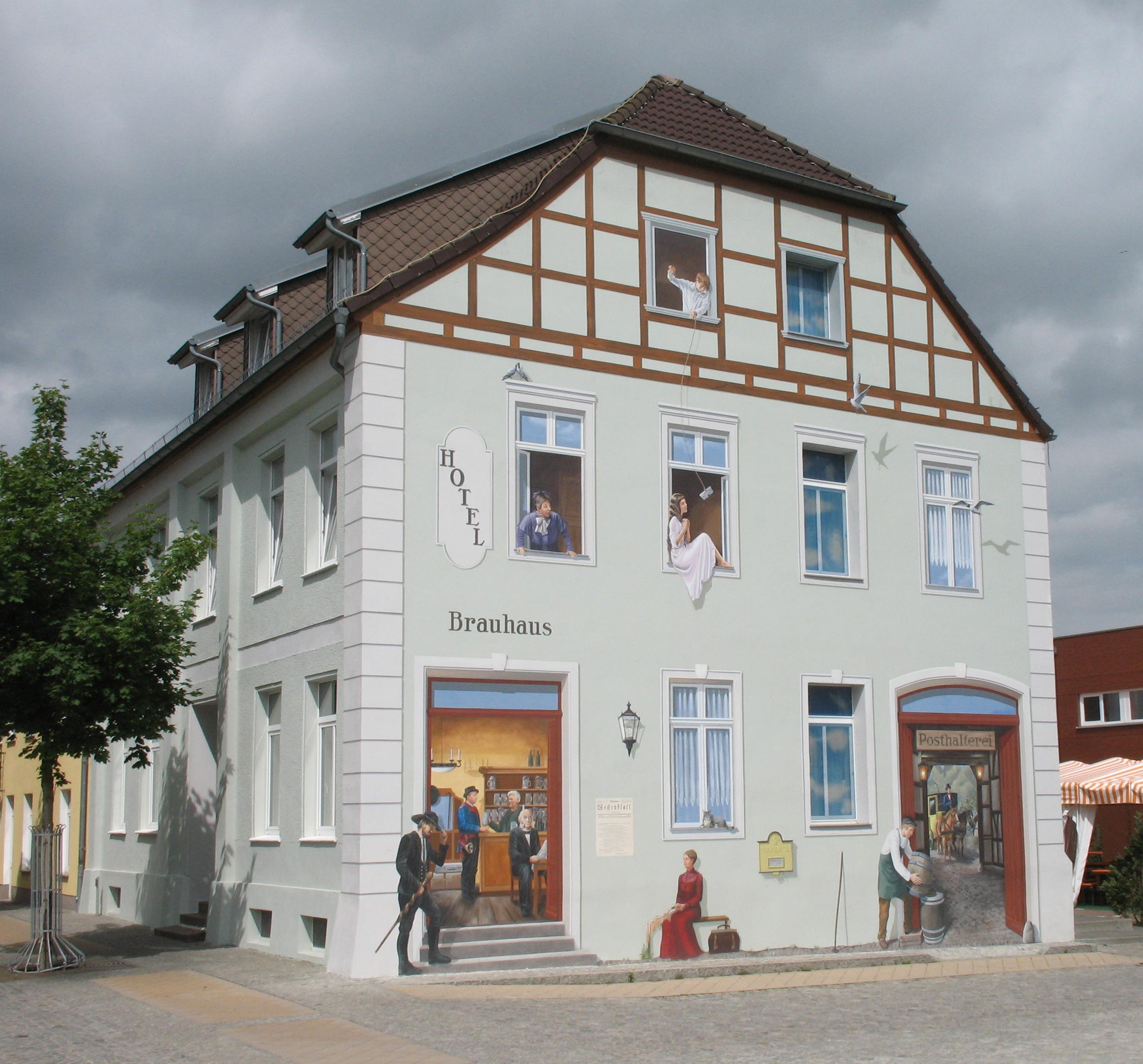
Former coaching inn

- Old Town Hall (Altes Rathaus) (Two-storey, brick building with arcades - former Gerichtslaube - on the East Gable, 15th century) by Alter Markt
- Old Fire Station (Single-storey, brick building, 19th century) by Alter Markt
- New Town Hall (Neues Rathaus) (Tudor-Gothic style, mid-19th century) with bullet hole from the Kapp Putsch of 1920 by Neuer Markt
- Lion Chemist's (Löwenapotheke) (two-storey, timber-framed building, around 1800, with the Haus des Gastes), Neuer Markt 21
- Town harbour (Stadthafen) with its old harbour warehouses (Hafenspeichern)
- Kietzspeicher
- Müritzeum, Germany's largest aquarium for native, freshwater fish.
- Main building of the Richard Wossidlo Grammar School (Richard-Wossidlo-Gymnasium)
- Weinberg House, a villa grandly called a Schloss
- Community and Administrative Centre (Bürger- und Verwaltungszentrum)
- Müritz Brewery

=== Historic monuments ===
- Memorial tablet on the Volksbank (Kiezstraße) to those tortured by the Soviets post-1945
- Monument in the cemetery (on the B 192 road) to wartime refugees from the German eastern territories
- Memorial tablet put up in 1994 at the head office of the European Academy of Mecklenburg-Western Pomerania (Europäische Akademie Mecklenburg-Vorpommern) to forced labourers and prisoners of war from eight European countries who had to work in the Memefa armaments factory
- Monument put up in 1945 on the cemetery by the graves of Soviet soldiers and forced labourers
- Memorial stie established in 1947 and 1950 at Am Kietz for 224 female concentration camp inmates who were victims of forced labour
- Memorial tablet from the 1960s on the house at Feldstraße 19 to the Communist resistance fighter, Hermann Gatzke, who was given a long prison sentence for his resistance
- Memorial tablet from the 1960er in Papenbergstraße 12 to the Communist town councillor, Paul Rachow, who was murdered in 1945 in Neuengamme concentration camp
- Memorial site with wooden sculpture from the year 1994 by sculptor, Sven Domann, on the corner of Geschwister-Scholl-Straße and Dietrich-Bonhoeffer-Straße to commemorate the Christian resistance of the White Rose movement
- Memorial site and tablet on the Papenberg hill on the road to Neubrandenburg to the Jewish cemetery that was desecrated by the Nazis in 1938. On the enclosing wall is a travertine stele by sculptor, Walter Preik, to the Jewish victims of Fascism
- Monument on the southern shore of the Tiefwarensee lake to the Waren synagogue

=== Regular events ===
- Since 2002 the Müritz Sail event has taken place every May, in which inland and offshore sailors take part and which attracts over 50,000 visitors
- On the last weekend in July the Mecklenburg-Vorpommern triathlon takes place.
- The Müritz Swim (Müritz-Schwimmen) has taken place annually for over 40 years over a 1,950 metre long course in the northern part of the Müritz. Several hundred swimmers take part.
- Since 2001 the Müritz Run (Müritz-Lauf) has become part of the sporting scene. Every year in August national and international sportsmen and women take part in the various competitions around the Müritz. The Müritz Run is the biggest event in the region in terms of numbers of participants

== Transport ==
=== Public transport ===
Waren (Müritz) station offers fast rail connections to Rostock at the Baltic Sea, Berlin, Leipzig and Munich. Within the town a network of buses is available. Several regional buses connect the town to almost every village in the district and the towns in the surroundings.

=== Boat connections ===
There are also boat connections to Klink, Röbel, Malchow, Plau and Land Fleesensee via the lakes of the lake district.

== Twin towns – sister cities ==
Waren is twinned with:

- Gorna Oryahovitsa, Bulgaria
- Magione, Italy
- Rokkasho, Japan
- Schleswig, Germany
- Springe, Germany
- Suwałki, Poland

== Notable people ==
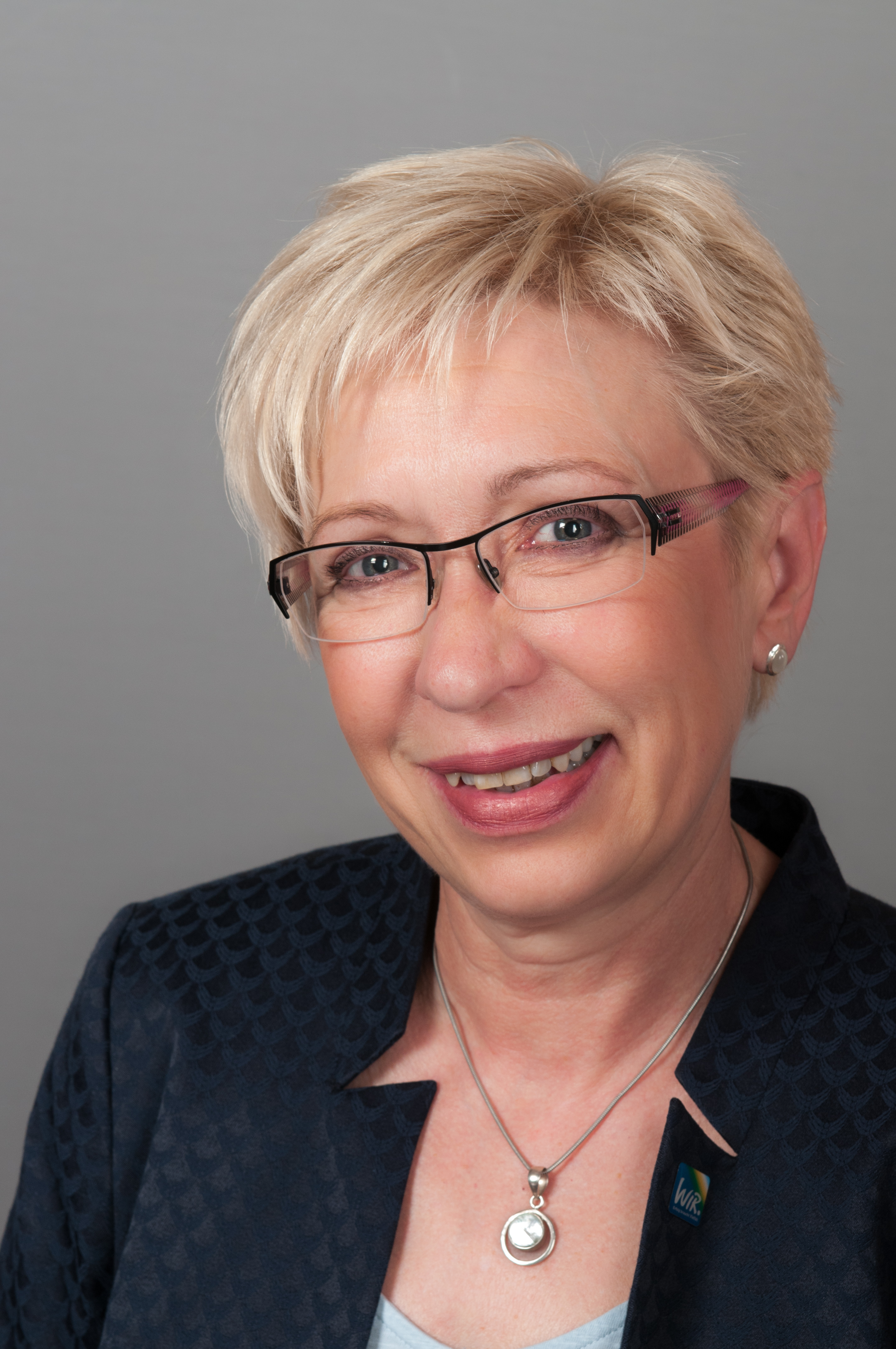
Sylvia Bretschneider, 2017

- Johann Albrecht II, (DE Wiki) (1590–1636), Duke of Mecklenburg
- Carl Henrich Dreyer, (DE Wiki) (1723–1802), jurist and politician
- Otto Christian Blandow (1778–1810), apothecary and botanist, specializing in the field of bryology.
- Henriette von Bissing, (DE Wiki) (1798–1879), novelist
- Victor Schlegel (1843–1905), geometer and author, local teacher 1869/1881
- Richard Wossidlo (1859–1939), folklorist, died locally
- Martha Fontane, (DE Wiki) (1860–1917), publisher and daughter of Theodor Fontane, died locally
- Heinz Sarkowski, (DE Wiki) (1925–2006), publisher and author
- Heinz Penzlin, (DE Wiki) (born 1932), zoologist and animal physiologist
- Jürgen Seidel, (DE Wiki) (born 1948), politician, vice state prime minister of Mecklenburg-Vorpommern
- Sylvia Bretschneider (1960–2019), politician, member and speaker of the local state assembly (Landtag)
- Rudolf Borchert, (DE Wiki) (1952–2019), politician
- David Timm (born 1969), pianist, organist, choral conductor and jazz musician.
- Katrin Borchert (born 1969), East German-born Australian sprint canoeist and 1992 Summer Olympics silver medallist
- Katrin Rutschow-Stomporowski (born 1975), rower and two-time Olympic gold medalist at the 1996 and 2004 Summer Olympics
- Nadine Julitz (born 1990), politician
