= Richard Wossidlo =

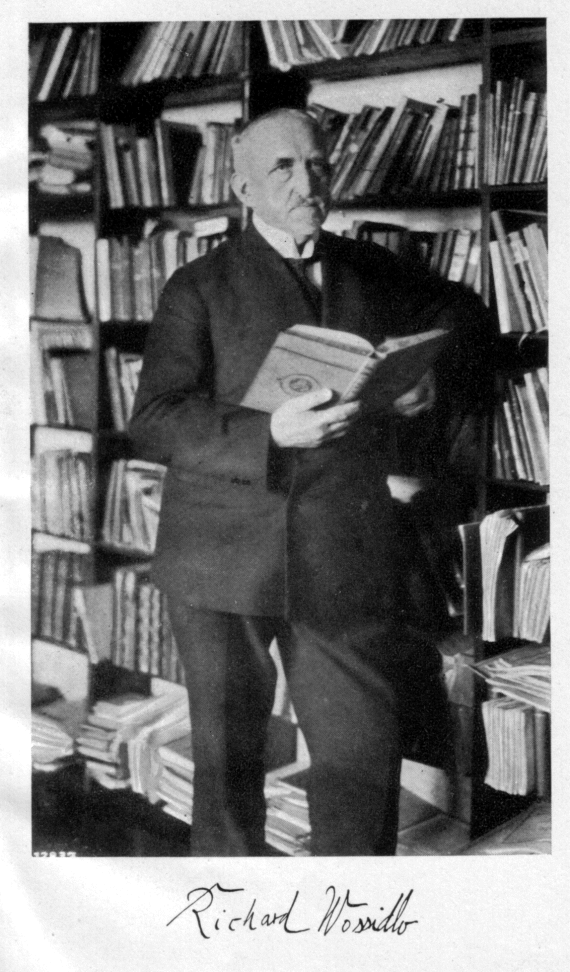
Richard Wossidlo

Richard Carl Theodor August Wossidlo (26 January 1859, in Friedrichshof – May 1939, in Waren an der Müritz) was a German schoolteacher and folklorist.

From 1876 to 1883 he studied classical and German philology at the universities of Rostock, Leipzig and Berlin. From 1886 to 1922 he taught classes in Greek, Latin and German at the gymnasium in Waren.

Beginning in 1886, he travelled throughout Mecklenburg, collecting and writing down legends, fairy tales, anecdotes and folk traditions that were compiled during interviews with local inhabitants. His interviewees included farmers, craftsmen, labourers and sailors. From 1897 to 1931 he published a well-received, four-volume on Mecklenburg folk traditions, titled Mecklenburgische Volksüberlieferungen. Today, the " Wossidlo-Archiv" of about two million documents is preserved at the University of Rostock.

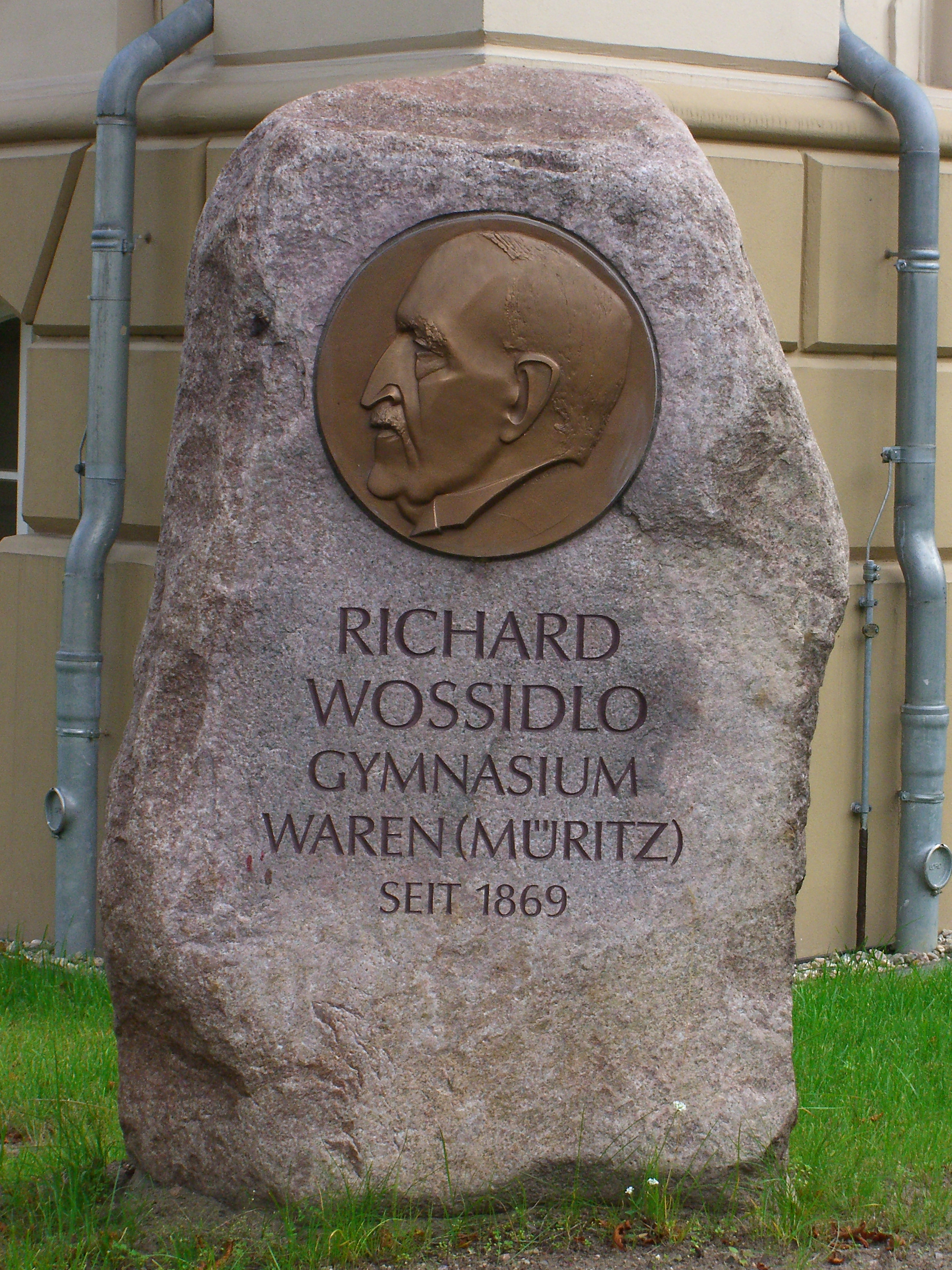
Monument commemorating Wossidlo in Waren

== Published works ==
- Imperative Bildungen im Niederdeutschen, 1890 – Essential training in Low German.
- Mecklenburgische Volksüberlieferungen, (4 volumes, 1897–1931) – Mecklenburg folk traditions.
  - Rätsel (1897) – Riddles.
  - Die Tiere im Munde des Volkes (1899) – Folklore about animals.
  - Kinderwartung und Kinderzucht (1906) – On child rearing.
  - Kinderreime (1931) – Nursery rhymes.
- Ein Winterabend in einem mecklenburgischen Bauernhause, (1901, 2nd edition 1906) – A winter evening in a Mecklenburg farmhouse.
- Über die Technik des Sammelns, 1906 – On the art of collecting.
- Über die Erforschung der Rethrasagen, 1908 – Study of Rethra sayings.
- Aus dem Lande Fritz Reuters, 1910 – From the land of Fritz Reuter.

With Hermann Teuchert, he created a Mecklenburg dictionary, Wossidlo-Teuchert Mecklenburgisches Wörterbuch.
