= Binnenmüritz =

Lake in Mecklenburg-Vorpommern, Germany

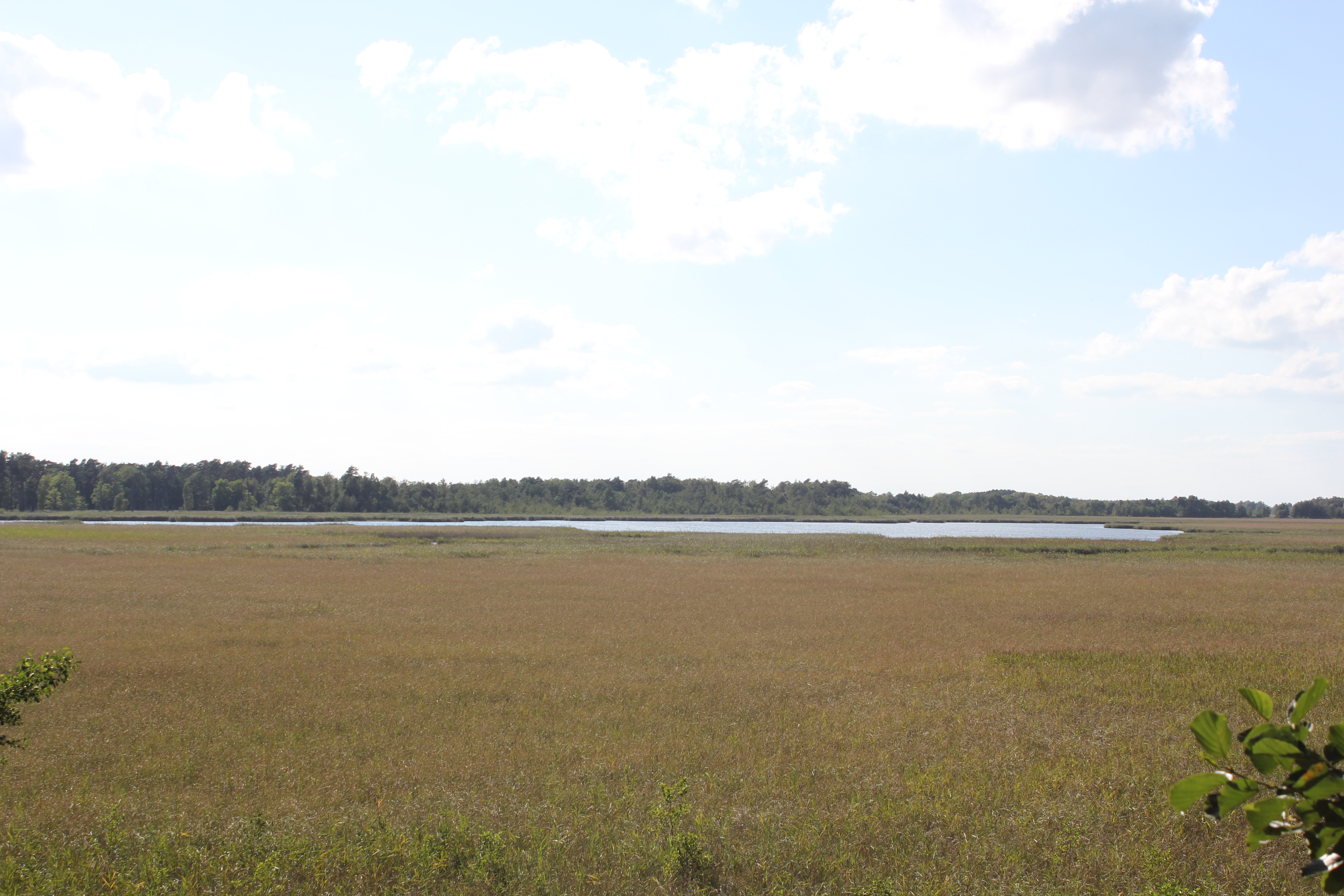
- 2012 Binnenmueritz Schwarzenhof

- Location within Mecklenburg-Vorpommern
- Location: Müritz National Park, Mecklenburg-Vorpommern
- Coordinates: 53°25′57″N 12°46′37″E
- Basin countries: Germany
- Max. length: 0.79 km (0.49 mi)
- Max. width: 0.45 km (0.28 mi)
- Surface area: 0.184 km^{2} (0.071 sq mi)
- Surface elevation: 62.4 m (205 ft)

The Binnenmüritz is a lake in the Müritz National Park, Mecklenburg-Vorpommern, Germany. At an elevation of 62.4 m, its surface area is 0.184 km^{2}. It is really a bay of Germany's largest inland lake, Lake Müritz.
