= Lärz =

- Municipality
- Location of Lärz within Mecklenburgische Seenplatte district
- Interactive map of Lärz
- Location within Germany Location within Mecklenburg-Vorpommern
- Coordinates: 53°17′23″N 12°45′00″E
- Country: Germany
- State: Mecklenburg-Vorpommern
- District: Mecklenburgische Seenplatte
- Municipal assoc.: Röbel-Müritz

Government
  - Mayor: Hartmut Lehmann

Area
  - Total: 43.07 km^{2} (16.63 sq mi)
- Elevation: 66 m (217 ft)

Population (2025-12-31)
  - Total: 478
  - Density: 11.1/km^{2} (28.7/sq mi)
- Time zone: UTC+01:00 (CET)
  - Summer (DST): UTC+02:00 (CEST)
- Postal codes: 17248
- Dialling codes: 039833
- Vehicle registration: MÜR
- Website: www.amt-roebel- mueritz.de

Lärz is a municipality in the Mecklenburgische Seenplatte district, in Mecklenburg-Vorpommern, Germany. It is governed by the Röbel-Müritz amt based in the city of Röbel.

== Geography ==
Lärz is located south of lake Müritz – in the Mecklenburg Lake District – between the towns of Rechlin and Mirow. The Mirow canal leads from Mirow to Vietzen, through the municipality of Lärz, and is part of the Müritz-Havel waterway. The west and south of the wooded district of Lärz is rich in lakes, such as lake Thüren, lake Tralow, lake Nebel, lake Müritzsee and lake Müritzarm; lake Sumpfsee and lake Kleine Müritz are also nearby. The upper Elde flows into lake Müritzsee, which is connected to lake Müritz via lake Müritzarm. The slightly hilly terrain around Lärz reaches a maximum of 89 m above sea level (NHN). The town of Mirow is five kilometers away, the town of Röbel about 15 kilometers away.

Lärz is surrounded by the neighboring communities of Rechlin in the north, Mirow in the east, Schwarz in the south, Wittstock/Dosse in the south-west, Buchholz and Priborn in the west and Südmüritz in the north-west.

The districts of Alt Gaarz, Gaarzer Mühle, Ichlim, Krümmel, Neu Gaarz and Troja belong to Lärz.

== History ==
In 1237, the originally Slavic settlement appeared as Lositz in a document from Prince Nikolaus von Werle. In 1257, Loziz was mentioned as a property of the Dobbertin Monastery. The old Polish place name was originally *Losica and was formed from the noun *los, "elk". It can be translated as the "location of the elk".

In contrast to the lawlessness of the farmworkers in the neighboring communities, the farmers in Lärz had enforced their own "village rules", a regulation of leasing to the farmers, in 1859 through trials against the Dobbertin monastery, which was progressive given the conditions in Mecklenburg at the time.

From 1914 to 1993, together with the neighboring municipality of Rechlin, Lärz was a military base. In 1941, the stationing of various test squadrons and the formation of a test command began in Lärz. Tests with the world's first jet aircraft, Heinkel He 178, took place at the Lärz airfield.

The railway connection built in 1922 from Mirow, Starsow branch, to Ellerholz and Rechlin led via Lärz. In 1967 the passenger traffic was stopped, the route was mainly used for military transport. It was planned to reactivate the railway line for tourist use, but it was dismantled in 2007. From 1934 to 1935, the road from Mirow via Lärz to Vietzen was built. From 1934 to 1936 the Müritz-Havel Canal was built from Mirow via Lärz to Vietzen.

Because of the military facilities in the area, Lärz was also the target of heavy bombardments in 1944 and 1945. On 21 May 1944, the first deep attack by American fighter-bombers took place on the airfield. On 24 May 1944, thirteen US bombers dropped further bombs and on 10 April 1945, 105 US bombers dropped 232 tons of bombs on the Lärz airfield.

On 2 May 1945, the area was occupied by the Red Army, which continued to use the airfield. In the 1980s, for example, up to 2 000 members of the Soviet armed forces were stationed in Lärz, such as fighter-bomber and helicopter squadrons. In March 1993, the troops now called the CIS armed forces withdrew from Lärz.

The airfield has been used as a civil airfield by the operating company Müritzflugplatz Rechlin-Lärz since 1994. The Rechlin-Lärz aviation museum is located on the airfield. In addition to an exhibition about the Rechlin test site, it also houses several aircraft that can be viewed, such as Mi-8, MiG-21 and Bréguet Atlantic.

In November 2018, a referendum took place in Lärz and Schwarz on an area change agreement, according to which the two municipalities would have merged with Rechlin. Both in Lärz and in Schwarz, however, a majority voted against a merger. In Lärz, of the 439 eligible voters, 252 voted against and 75 for a merger. The turnout was around 74 percent.

== Politics ==
The municipality has no officially approved emblem, neither a coat of arms nor a flag. The official seal is the small state seal with the coat of arms of the state of Mecklenburg. It shows a bull's head and the inscription "GEMEINDE LÄRZ".

== Culture ==
In Lärz, the annual Fusion Festival and the biennial at.tension theater festival are hosted by the Kulturkosmos Müritz registered association.

== Sights ==
- In the village church of Lärz, built in 1724, there is a pulpit altar and remains of baroque ceiling paintings. The organ comes from the Silesian organ building company Schlag & Söhne. It was built in 1895 and is the only completely preserved instrument from this company in Mecklenburg.
- The wood-paneled village church Alt Gaarz from 1854/55 houses a Buchholz organ. The church was built by the court architect Friedrich Wilhelm Buttel.
- The aviation museum at the Müritz Airpark airfield shows aircraft and a helicopters on 800 m² of exhibition space. The Fusion Festival takes place every year in June at the airfield.

== Traffic ==
Lärz is located on the road from Mirow to Rechlin, which, in contrast to federal highway 198, passes south of Lärz airfield. To the south there is a road connection to Rheinsberg in Brandenburg. The Röbel motorway junction on the A 19 motorway is around 21 km away. The next train station is in nearby Mirow, serving the railway line to Neustrelitz.
