= Müritz Airpark =

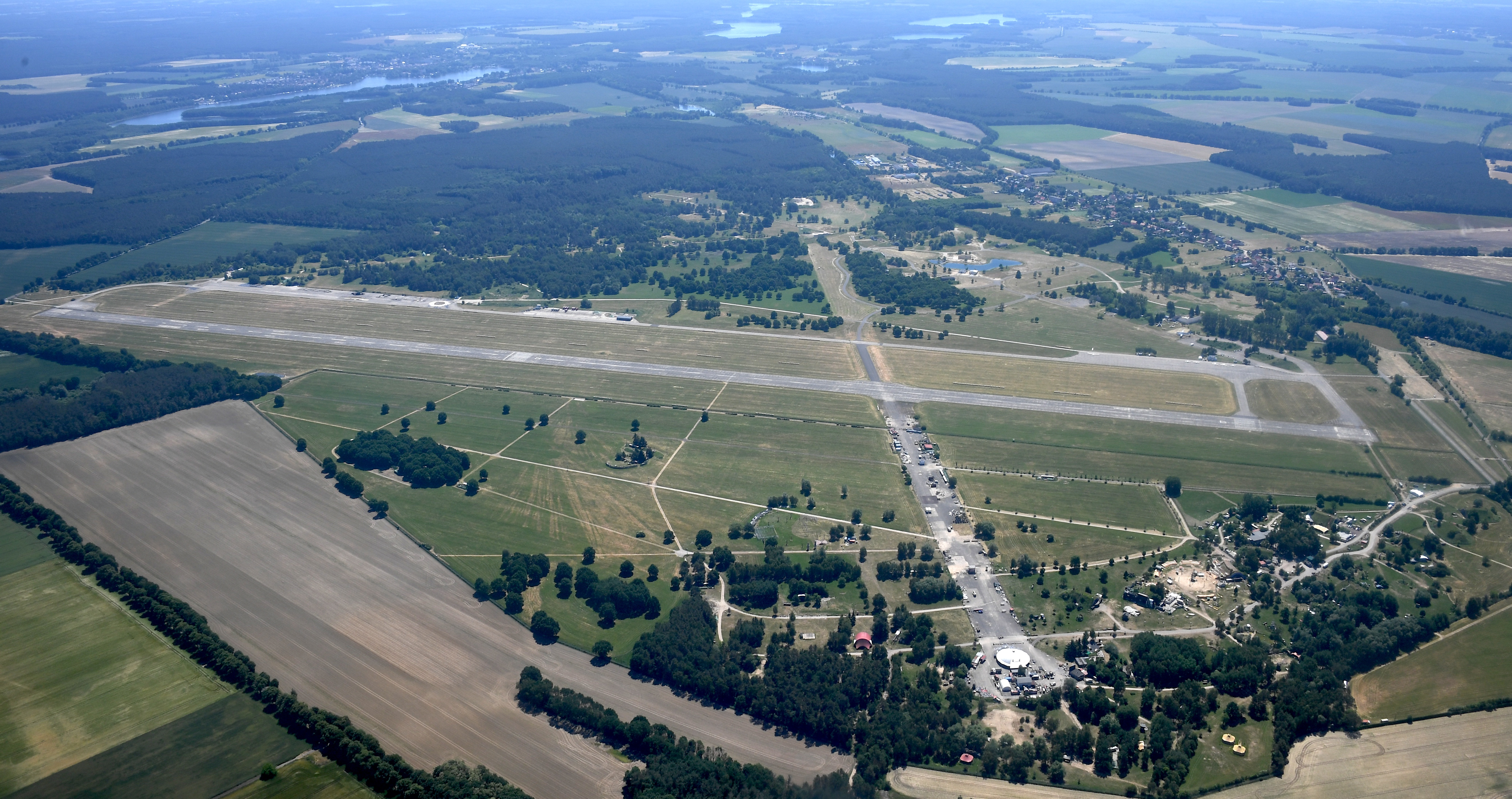
- IATA: REB; ICAO: EDAX

Summary
- Airport type: Public
- Operator: Entwicklungs-und Betriebsgesellschaft Müritzflugplatz Rechlin-Lärz mbH
- Location: Rechlin, Germany
- Elevation AMSL: 220 ft / 67 m
- Coordinates: 53°18′23″N 012°45′11″E
- Website: mueritz-airpark.de
- Interactive map of Müritz Airpark

Runways
Direction	Length		Surface
Direction	ft	m	Surface
07/25	7,808	2,380	Concrete
14/32	6,170	1,880	Concrete disused

Müritz Airpark (IATA: REB, ICAO: EDAX), previously known as Rechlin–Lärz Airfield, is an airfield in the village of Rechlin, Mecklenburg-Western Pomerania, Germany.

The airport was once part of the Third Reich era's Luftwaffe main testing ground, or Erprobungsstelle for new aircraft designs, which was centered on two large turf areas some 4.5 km (2.8 mi) due north (at 53°20′48.11″N 12°44′23.25″E) of the 21st century era paved-runway airport facility.

The modern airport is not used for scheduled traffic but is still open for general aviation. It is also home to other leisure activities such as the Fusion Festival.

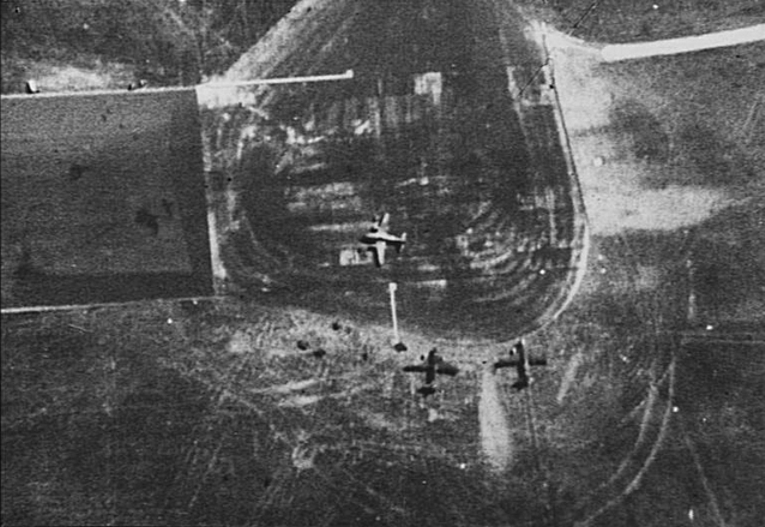
Me 262A jet fighters in 1944 at the southerly Lärz facility, today the main Rechlin-Lärz location.

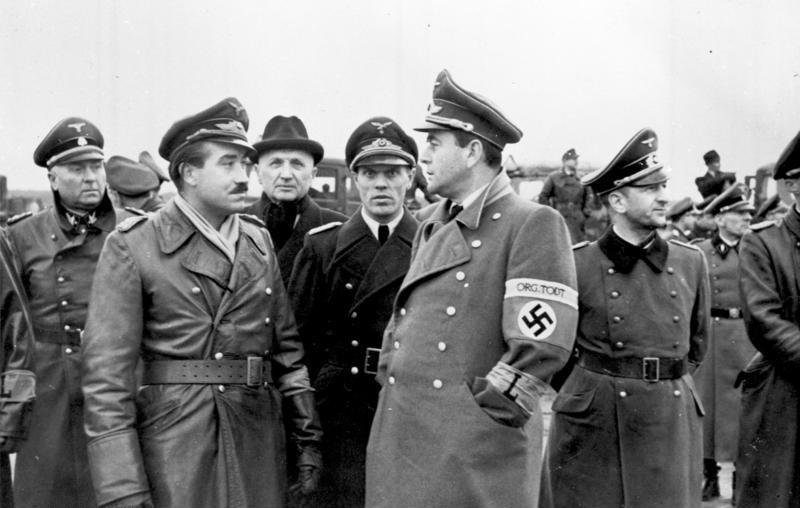
Adolf Galland left center and Albert Speer right center at Rechlin during a defense meeting, 5–7 September 1943.

== History ==
=== Construction ===
Construction of an airfield at Rechlin started in 1916, and it was officially opened on 29 August 1918. After the end of World War I, the airfield was closed again and many of its installations dismantled.

During the 1920s, the airfield was reopened as a civilian airbase, but was soon back in use as a testing ground for secret German air force experiments under the Treaty of Rapallo. The site was probably chosen for its remote location in an almost uninhabited area.

=== Official Luftwaffe testing ground ===
On February 26, 1936, on the order of Wehrmacht Generalfeldmarschall Werner von Blomberg, the Rechlin airfield was designated as the official central testing ground (Erprobungsstelle or E-Stelle) of the Luftwaffe.

The facility took the form of a typical pre-World War II aerodrome, with no clearly defined "runways", being bounded by a roughly hexagonal-layout perimeter road defining an area approximately 1,700 meters (5,600 feet) across within it of about 234.3 hectares, or 578.9 acres. This perimeter road still exists.

The turf-surfaced site was expanded by constructing two more airfields: a second, smaller turf-surfaced field just east of the main site in nearby Roggentin and just south of the main site at Lärz, the latter of which became the modern airfield. Construction work on the airfields and the accompanying barracks was partly carried out by forced labor from nearby concentration camp Ravensbrück.

=== Testing Prototype and Enemy Aircraft ===
Many of the Luftwaffe's new combat aircraft prototypes were test flown from Reclin's main turf-field facilities.

The special operations combat wing of the Luftwaffe, KG 200, with its array of captured planes also used the airfields. However, after several Allied attacks on the primary turf-surfaced airfield, and the satellite Roggentin airfield in 1944, testing of late-war planes was shifted to the other satellite airfield at Lärz.

The Rechlin data sheets on Luftwaffe and captured Allied aircraft are considered by many aviation historians to be among the most reliable sources for aircraft performance data from the World War II era.

=== Destruction ===
On April 10, 1945, a final bomber attack by 11 B-17s and 159 B-24s of the US Eighth Air Force, which was targeting airfields used by German jet fighters, almost completely destroyed the airfields. What was left was blown up by the German garrison before Soviet troops arrived at Rechlin on May 2.

=== Post War ===
From 1946, the Soviet Air Force had an airbase at Rechlin. The 19th Guards fighter-bomber regiment of the 16th Air Army and a helicopter squadron were stationed at Lärz, and the airfield at Rechlin was used by the National People's Army (NVA).

In West German, Rechlin's role was taken over by the Bundeswehr military aviation installation at Manching, as Rechlin was well inside the borders of East Germany.

=== Civilian Use ===
Military usage of the airfields continued until 1993, when the last Russian air force units returned to Russia. The airfield was reopened for civilian use in 1994, and today is also the site of the annual Fusion music festival.

== See also ==
- Erprobungsstelle Tarnewitz, one of the coastal Erprobungsstellen on the Baltic Sea under control from the Rechlin HQ facility
- Luftfahrtforschungsanstalt, the largest (and most secretive) aviation research facility of the Third Reich (1935–45) near Völkenrode, but without an airfield of its own.
- Peenemünde Airfield, coastal facility under control from the Rechlin HQ
- Edgar Petersen, the World War II Luftwaffe colonel (Oberst) who commanded both the Rechlin facility, and was the "KdE" (Kommandeur der Erprobungstellen), or commander for the entire Luftwaffe test department late in the war.
- Hanna Reitsch
- Oslo Report, which divulged the Erprobungstelle facility very early in the war to the British
