= Oberbek =

River in Germany

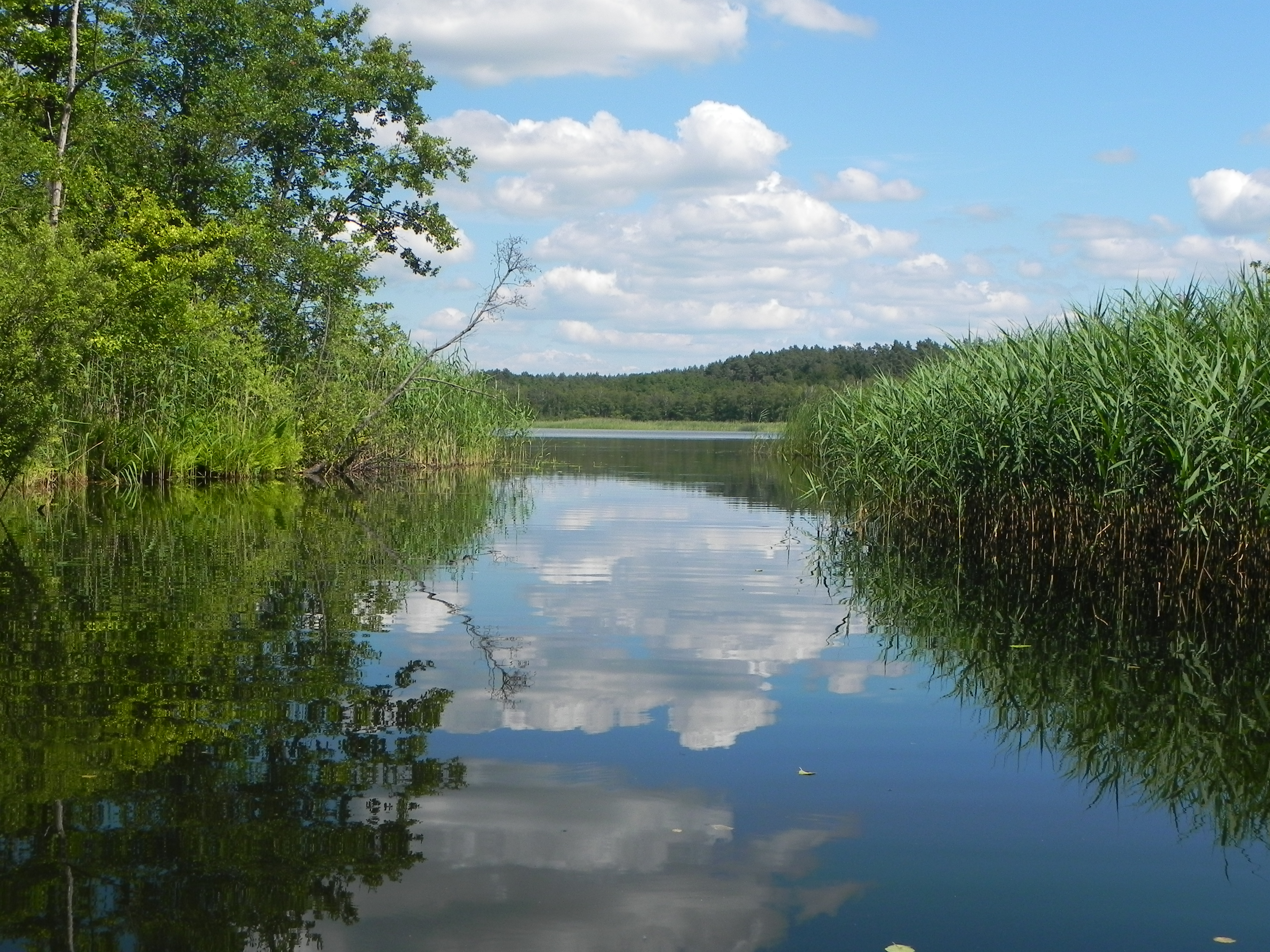

Location
- Country: Germany
- States: Mecklenburg-Vorpommern

Physical characteristics
- Source
  - location: Vilzsee
- Mouth
  - location: Rätzsee
  - coordinates: 53.2247°N 12.8669°E

Basin features
- Progression: Drosedower Bek→ Dollbek→ Müritz-Havel-Wasserstraße→ Havel→ Elbe→ North Sea

Oberbek is a river of Mecklenburg-Vorpommern, Germany. It connects the Vilzsee with the Rätzsee. The Oberbek is a stream approximately 2 km long. The course of the river is interrupted at the weir at Fleether Mühle, which is why it is only partially navigable.

== Geography ==
Geographically, the Oberbek is situated within the typical lake and woodland landscape of the Mecklenburg Lake District. The area was shaped by the last Ice Age and consists of numerous lakes, canals and gentle slopes. The river flows through a very flat landscape, which means it flows slowly and calmly and is closely integrated into the regional water system.

== See also ==
- List of rivers of Mecklenburg-Vorpommern
