= Wilhelm von Giesebrecht =

German historian

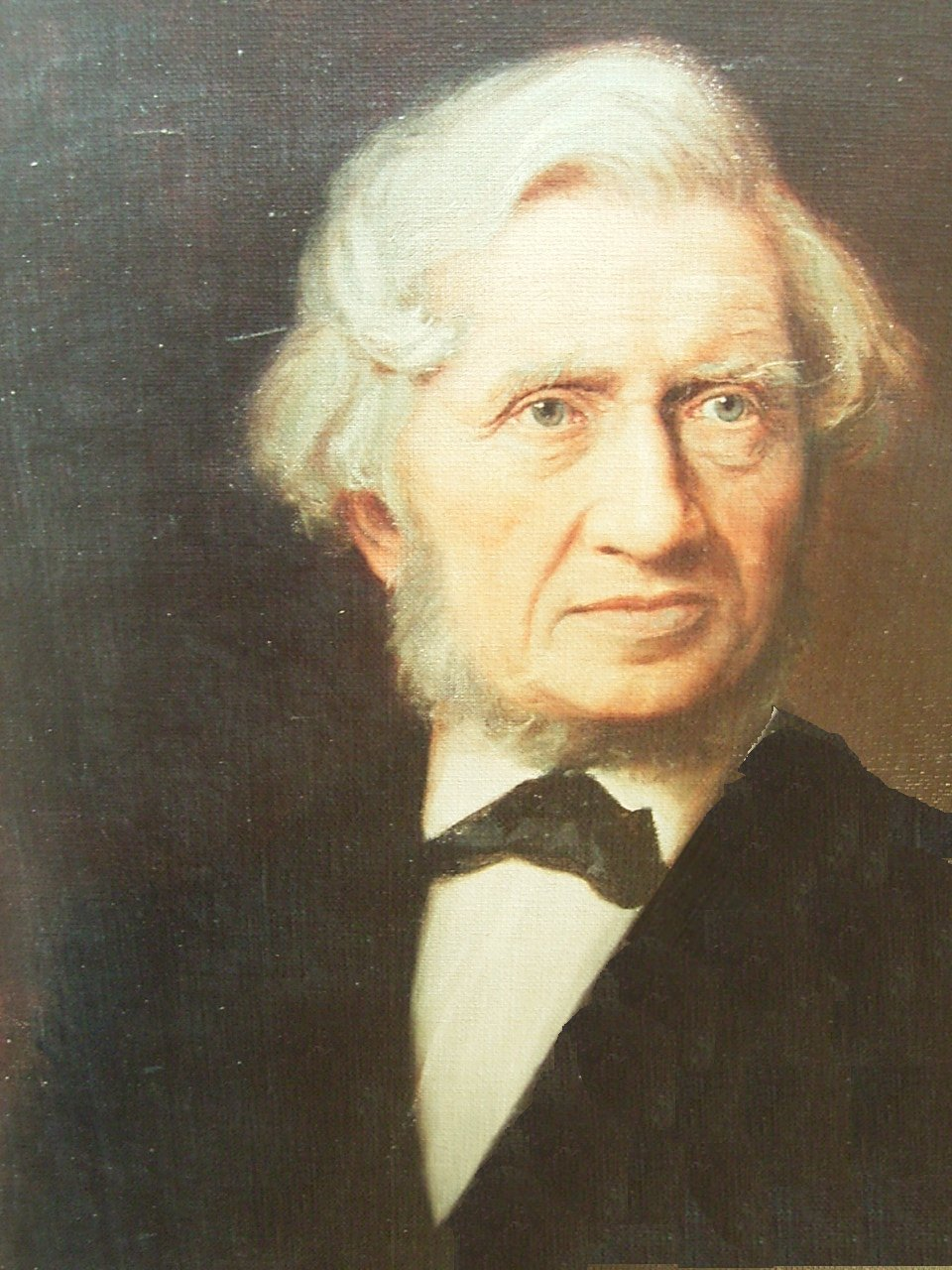
Friedrich Wilhelm von Giesebrecht

Friedrich Wilhelm von Giesebrecht (5 March 1814 – 17 December 1889) was a German historian.

He was born in Berlin, the son of Karl Giesebrecht (died 1832), and a nephew of the poet Ludwig Giesebrecht (1792–1873).

He studied under Leopold von Ranke, and his first important work, Geschichte Ottos II., was contributed to Ranke's Jahrbücher des deutschen Reichs unter dem sächsischen Hause (Berlin, 1837–1840). In 1841, he published his Jahrbücher des Klosters Altaich, a reconstruction of the lost Annales Altahenses, a medieval source of which fragments only were known to be extant, and these were obscured in other chronicles. The brilliance of this performance was shown in 1867, when a copy of the original chronicle was found, and it was seen that Giesebrecht's text was substantially correct.

In the meantime he had been appointed Oberlehrer in the Joachimsthaler Gymnasium in Berlin; had paid a visit to Italy, and as a result of his researches there had published De litterarum studiis apud halos primis mediiaevi seculis (Berlin, 1845), a study upon the survival of culture in Italian cities during the Middle Ages, and also several critical essays upon the sources for the early history of the popes. In 1851 appeared his translation of the Historiae of Gregory of Tours, which is the standard German translation.

Four years later appeared the first volume of his great work, Geschichte der deutschen Kaiserzeit, the fifth volume of which was published in 1888. This work was the first in which the results of the scientific methods of research were thrown open to the world at large. Largeness of style and brilliance of portrayal were joined to an absolute mastery of the sources in a way hitherto unachieved by any German historian.

Giesebrecht's history appeared when the new German empire was in the making, and became popular owing both to its patriotic tone and its intrinsic merits. In 1857, he went to Königsberg as professor ordinarius, and in 1862 succeeded Heinrich von Sybel as professor of history at the Ludwig-Maximilians-Universität München (LMU). The Bavarian government honoured him in various ways, and he died in Munich on 17 December 1889.

In addition to the works already mentioned, Giesebrecht published a good monograph on Arnold of Brescia (Munich, 1873), a collection of essays under the title Deutsche Reden (Munich, 1881), and was an active member of the group of scholars who took over the direction of the Monumenta Germaniae historica in 1875. In 1895 Bernhard von Simson added a sixth volume to the Geschichte der deutschen Kaiserzeit, thus bringing the work down to the death of Emperor Frederick I in 1190.
