= Larz =

Larz may refer to:

- Lärz, a municipality in Germany
- Larz, a given name; people with the name include:
  - Larz Anderson (1866–1937), American diplomat
  - Larz Bourne (1916–1993), American cartoon writer
