= Fusion Festival =

Music festival

Fusion Festival Фузион
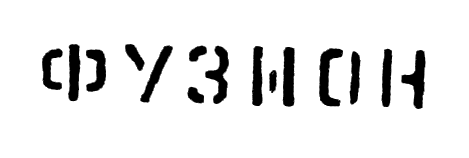
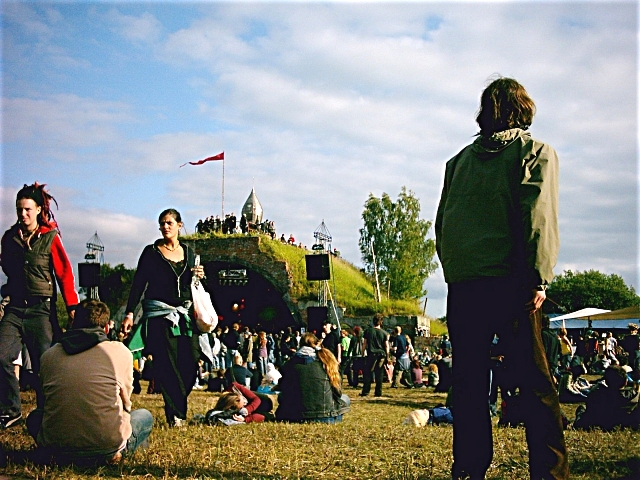
- Fusion Festival area at Müritz Airpark in Lärz near Mirow, Mecklenburg, Germany
- Genre: Techno, Electronic, Trance, Dance, Hip Hop, Reggae
- Dates: last weekend of June or first weekend of July
- Locations: Lärz, Mecklenburg-Vorpommern, Germany
- Years active: 1997–present
- Website: fusion-festival.de

The Fusion Festival is a music and arts festival with a countercultural character. It takes place at a former military airport called Müritz Airpark in Lärz, Mecklenburg-Vorpommern, in northeastern Germany. The festival name is often depicted in Cyrillic letters as Фузион, but pronounced like the English word fusion ['fjuʒən]. The annual festival was started by the Kulturkosmos organisation in 1997 and is described by the organizers as a place to practice "Holiday Communism" (Ferienkommunismus). It lasts four to six days, usually at the end of June. In 2016, the Fusion Festival event took place from 29 June to 3 July and which has attracted some 70,000 attendees for each year's festival, since the 2013 event, which the comparable American Burning Man event only matched in 2015.

Different musical styles are represented at the festival, but the line up is not released beforehand. Mostly electronic music is present, but there is no stylistic restriction for the various live music acts, and the festival attendees may bring their own instruments. The festival also holds its own film festival and features different scales of art installations. Attendees may bring their own art and appear in artistic costumes. Only vegetarian food is sold at the festival grounds.

The festival aims to create a Temporary Autonomous Zone and a transformational environment. Due to its avantgardistic attitude and the variety of art, the Fusion Festival has been described as a "European Burning Man".

== Concept ==
The Fusion Festival combines all styles of the underground electronic music scene and various other styles, sometimes depending on the attendees who choose to play their own music. It is described as a space people go to free their minds from their everyday lives, jobs, studies and other responsibilities. It is the result of the search for an alternative through music, to the system "people are forced to live in". People go to the Fusion to experience a different way of socializing and living, where experiencing one another freely, sharing love for music and art connects different scenes and minds. Art installations include performance arts, static artworks, sculptures, art cars and various other forms.

== Festival site ==
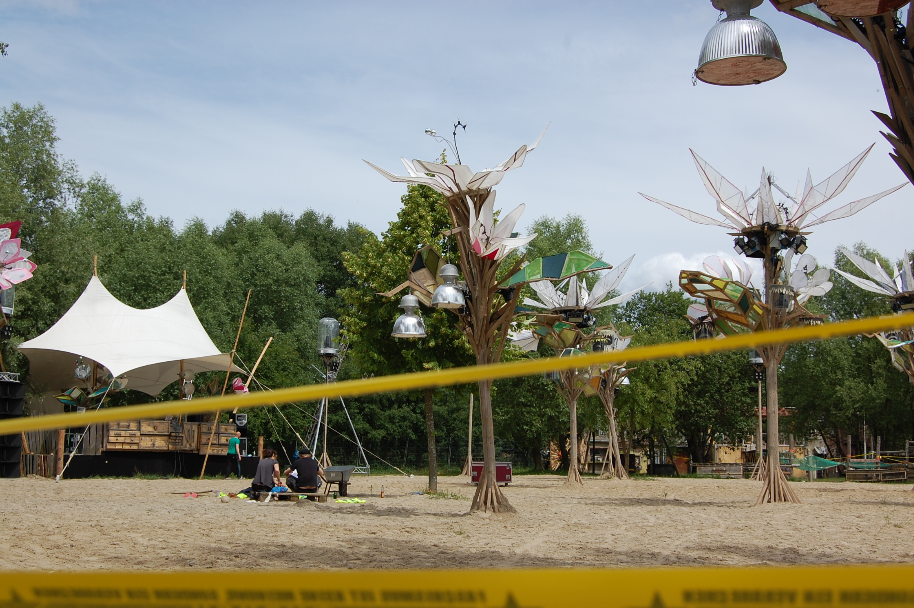
Dancing Desert installation at Fusion Festival 2014

Fusion Festival began in 1997 near the city of Lärz in north-eastern Germany, about 160 km (100 mi) from Berlin and 230 km (140 mi) from Hamburg.

The location is on the original grass-covered grounds of the disused Erprobungsstelle Rechlin Third Reich-era central military experimental airfield (at 53°20′48.11″N 12°44′23.25″E for the 234-hectare (580-acre) area central field) about 4.5 km (2.8 mi) due north of the modern Rechlin-Lärz Airfield facility. The site was first acquired by the German Empire in 1916 as an aviation research and training ground, opening the facility for use by the Luftstreitkräfte in August 1918. After the establishment of the Luftwaffe in 1935, the field served as the Erprobungsstelle Rechlin central military aircraft test facility of the Third Reich through early 1945, and it was captured by the Soviet Red Army on 2 May 1945, for use by the VVS. There are grass-covered concrete hangars (actual bunkers) from that time that were used for Soviet fighter aircraft (hence the Cyrillic transliteration of the festival name and various stages, as many Cyrillic inscriptions were still present on the site). The airfield was reopened for civilian use in 1994 and sold to the Müritz Airpark Group in 2010.

== See also ==
- Boom Festival
- Burning Man
- List of electronic music festivals
