= Rätzsee =

Lake in Germany

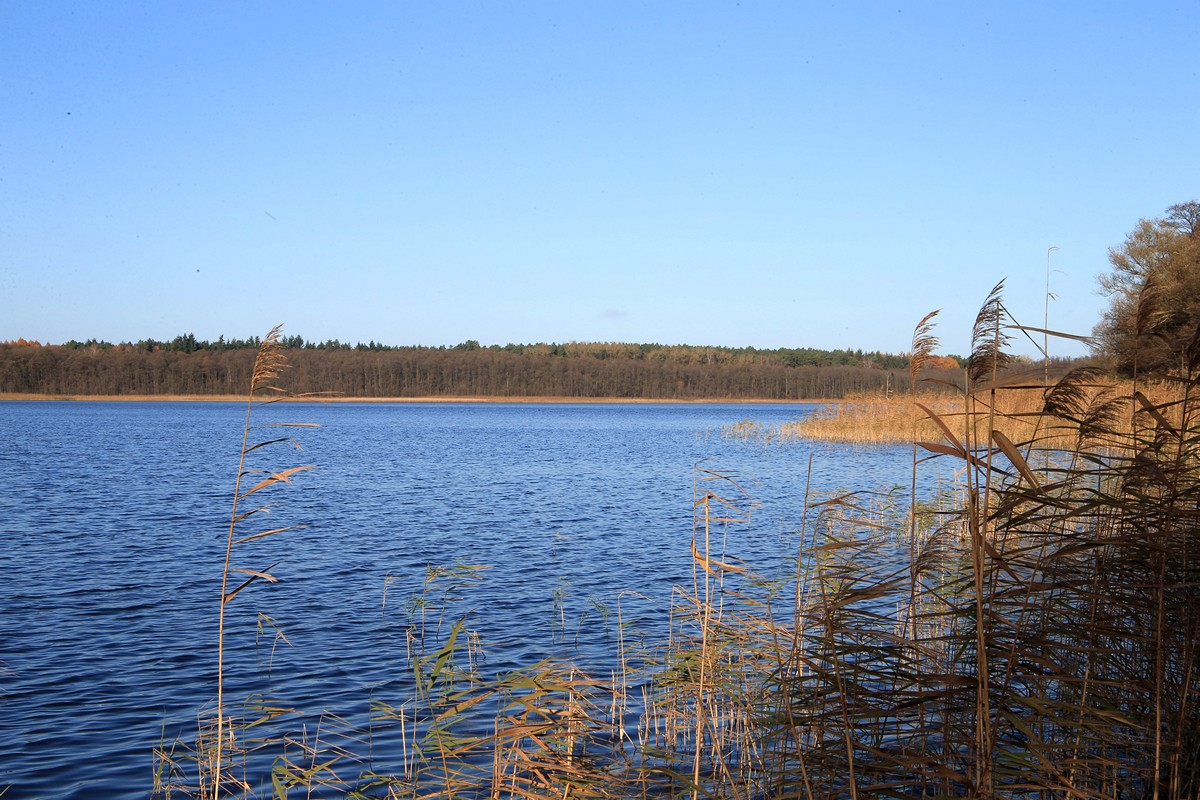

- Location within Mecklenburg-Vorpommern
- Location: Mecklenburgische Seenplatte, Mecklenburg-Vorpommern
- Coordinates: 53°14′30″N 12°53′13″E
- Primary inflows: Müritz–Havel–Wasserstraße über die Oberbek
- Primary outflows: Drosedower Bek
- Basin countries: Germany
- Surface area: 2.92 km^{2} (1.13 sq mi)
- Max. depth: 20 m (66 ft)
- Surface elevation: 57.5 m (189 ft)

Rätzsee is a lake in the Mecklenburgische Seenplatte district in Mecklenburg-Vorpommern, Germany. At an elevation of 57.5 m, its surface area is 2.92 km^{2}.

There is a nudist campsite that hosts a rainbow camping event and as of 2025, a nudist hiking trail.
