= Drosedower Bek =

River in Germany

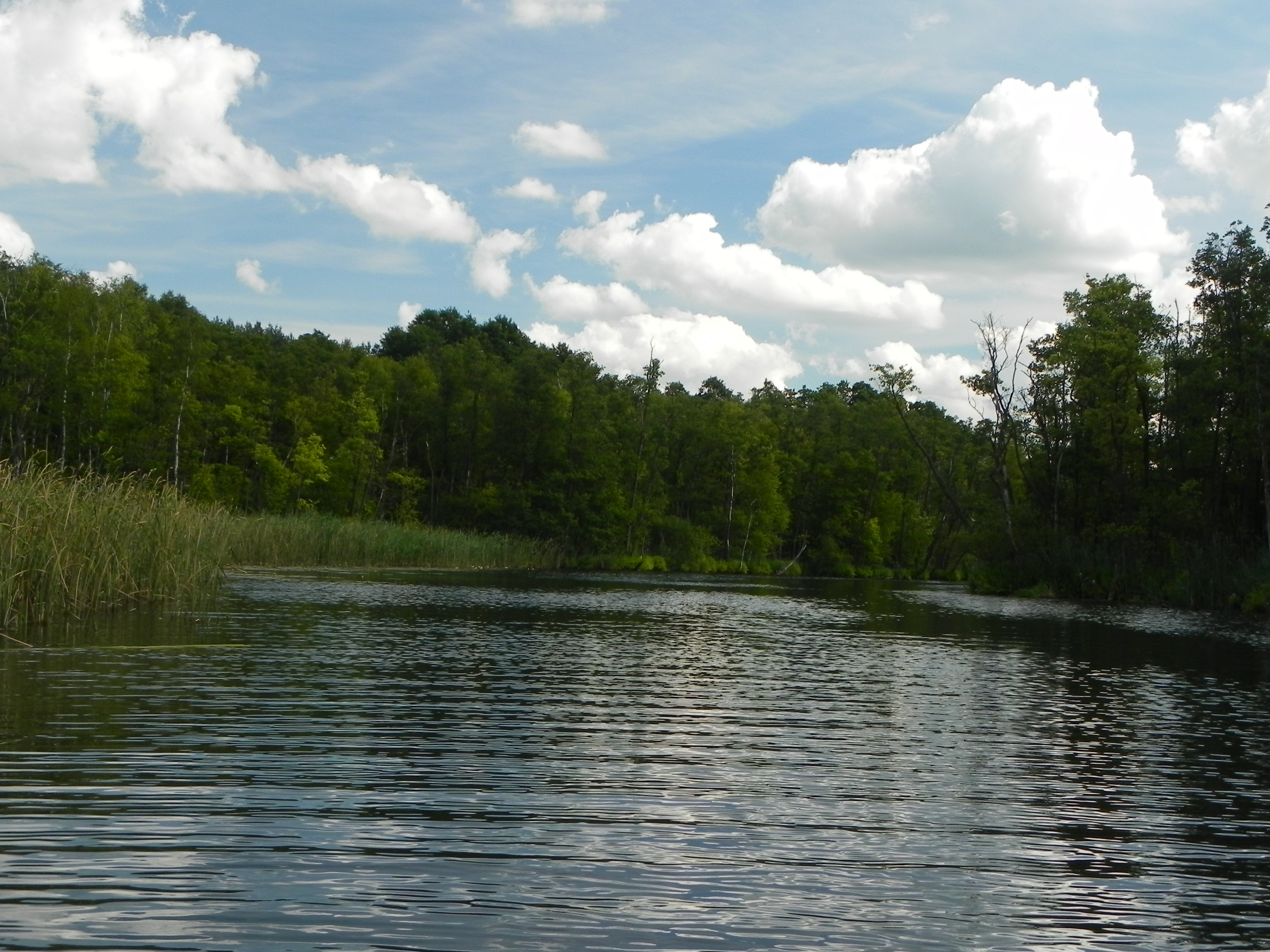

Location
- Country: Germany
- State: Mecklenburg-Vorpommern

Physical characteristics
- Source
  - location: Rätzsee
- Mouth
  - location: Gobenowsee
  - coordinates: 53.2317°N 12.9127°E

Basin features
- Progression: Dollbek→ Müritz-Havel-Wasserstraße→ Havel→ Elbe→ North Sea

Drosedower Bek is a river of Mecklenburg-Vorpommern, Germany. It connects the Rätzsee with the Gobenowsee.

Drosedower Bek is a river of Mecklenburg-Vorpommern, Germany. It connects the Rätzsee with the Gobenowsee. The stream is approximately 2.5 km (1.6 mi) long, with an elevation difference of less than 10 centimetres (4 in) along its entire course, meaning its flow is extremely gentle and barely noticeable. It flows through alder carr woodland and marshland, passing the village of Drosedow, from which it takes its name. The river is closed to motorized boats, and a wooden footbridge crosses it at approximately the midpoint of its course.

== See also ==
- List of rivers of Mecklenburg-Vorpommern
