= Gobenowsee =

Lake in Mecklenburg-Vorpommern, Germany

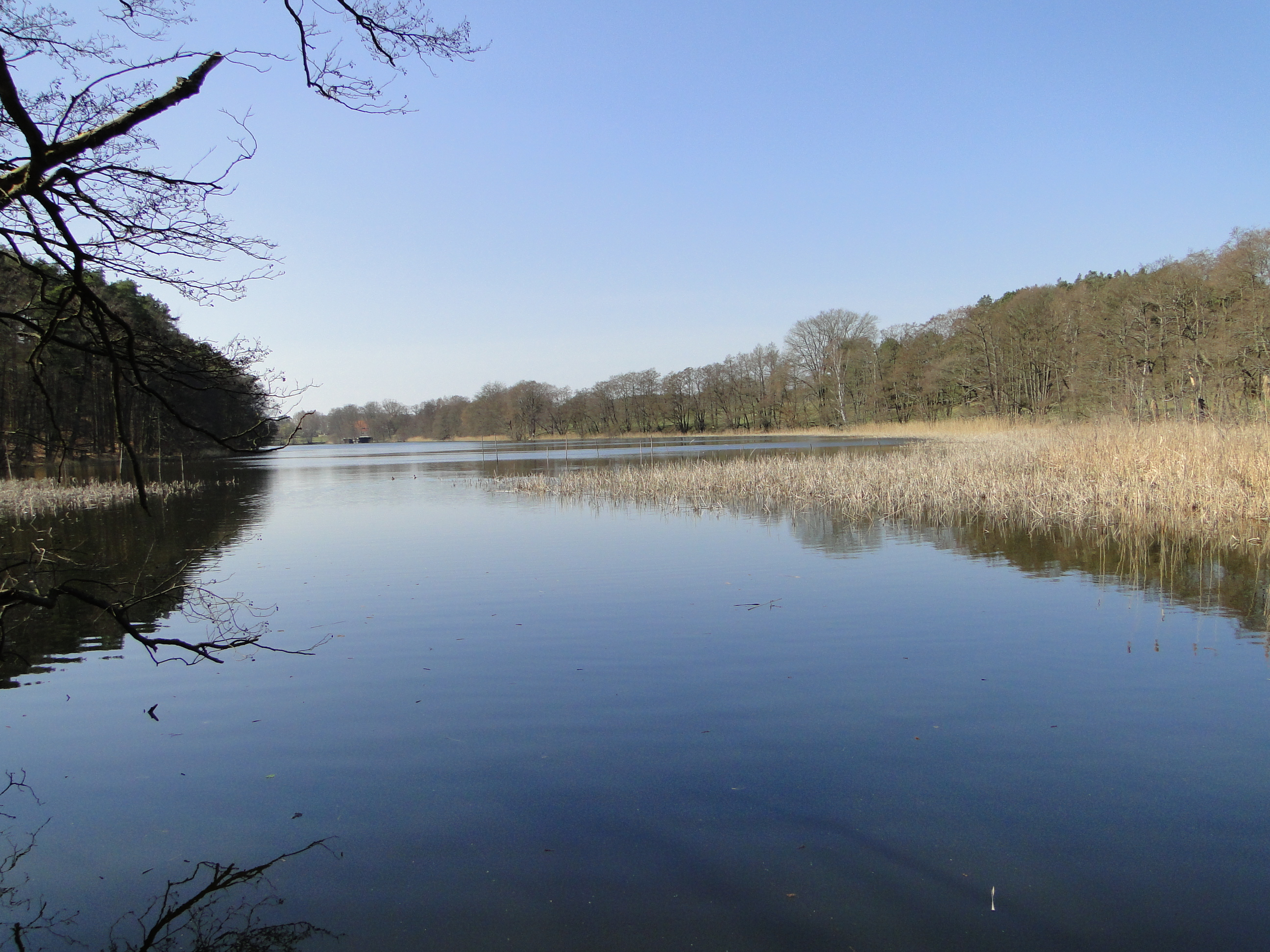

- Location within Mecklenburg-Vorpommern
- Location: Mecklenburgische Seenplatte, Mecklenburg-Vorpommern
- Coordinates: 53°13′28.7″N 12°54′58.74″E
- Primary inflows: Drosedower Bek
- Primary outflows: Dollbek
- Basin countries: Germany
- Surface area: 1.35 km^{2} (0.52 sq mi)
- Surface elevation: 57.5 m (189 ft)

Gobenowsee is a lake in the Mecklenburgische Seenplatte district in Mecklenburg-Vorpommern, Germany. It is at an elevation of 57.5 m, and its surface area is 1.35 km^{2}.
