= Bundeswehr Technical and Airworthiness Center for Aircraft =

Coordinates: 48°42′09″N 11°32′01″E

Bundeswehr Technical and Airworthiness Center for Aircraft (Wehrtechnische Dienststelle für Luftfahrzeuge – Musterprüfwesen für Luftfahrtgerät der Bundeswehr) or (Wehrtechnische Dienststelle 61 (WTD 61))
- Active: 1957 – present
- Country: Federal Republic of Germany
- Branch: Federal Office of Bundeswehr Equipment, Information Technology and In-Service Support
- Role: Flight testing, evaluation, type approval
- Garrison/HQ: Manching Air Base

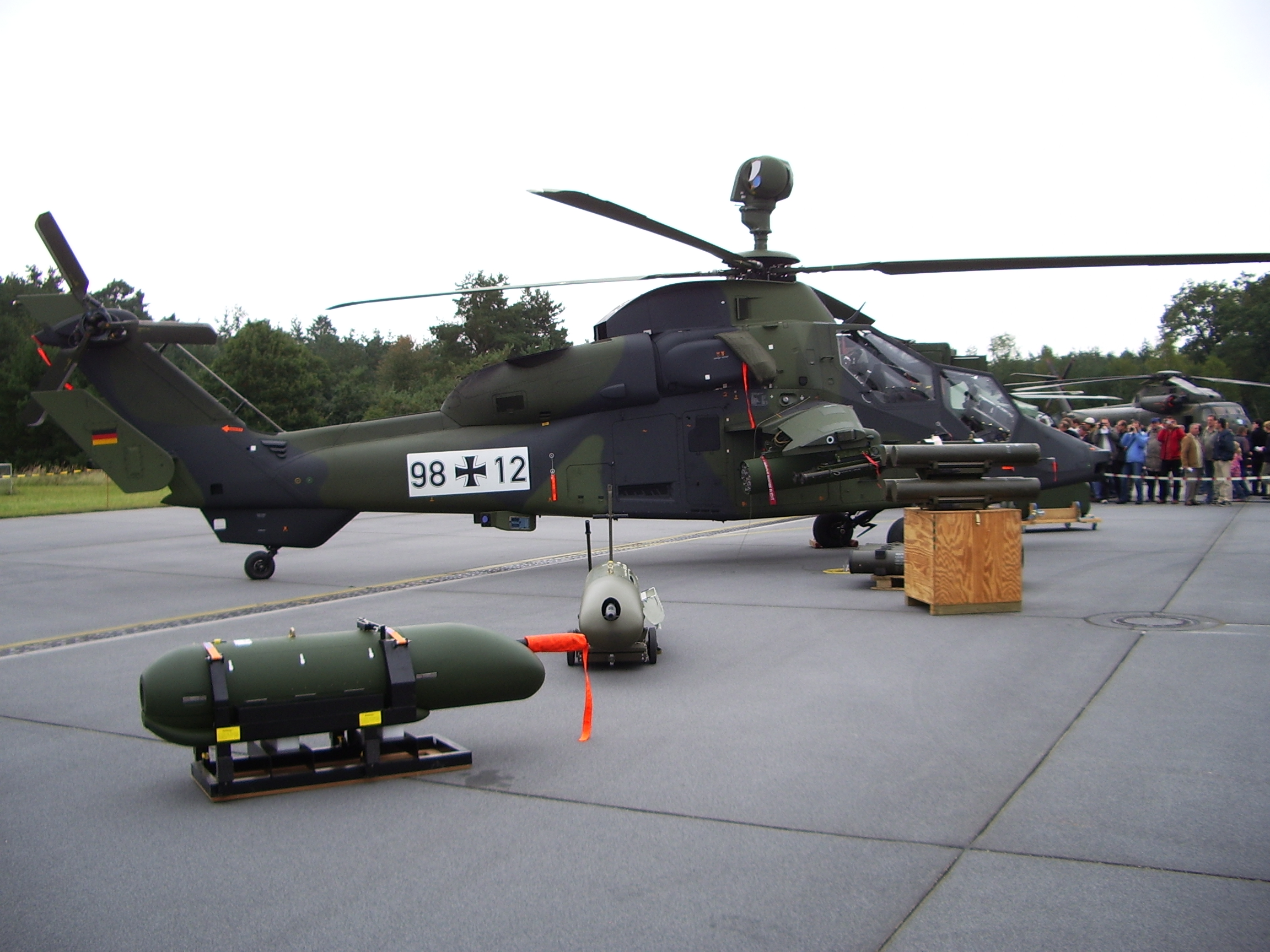
Eurocopter Tiger

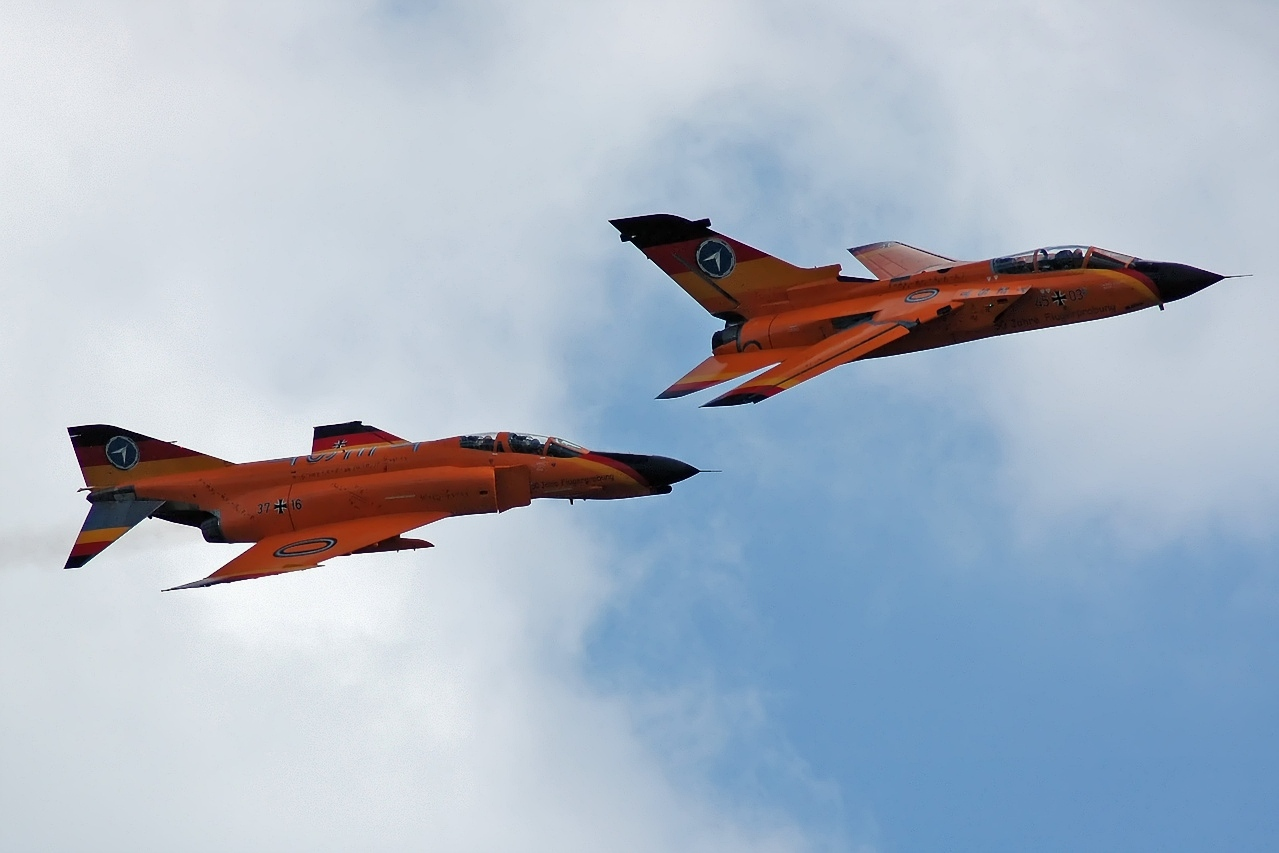
Panavia Tornado and F-4 Phantom

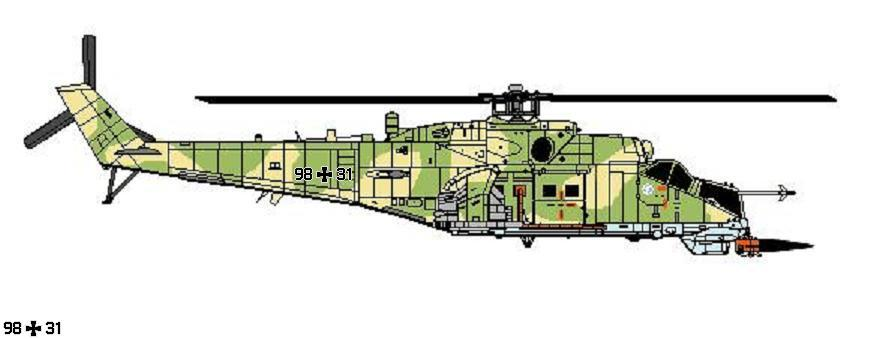
Mil Mi 24

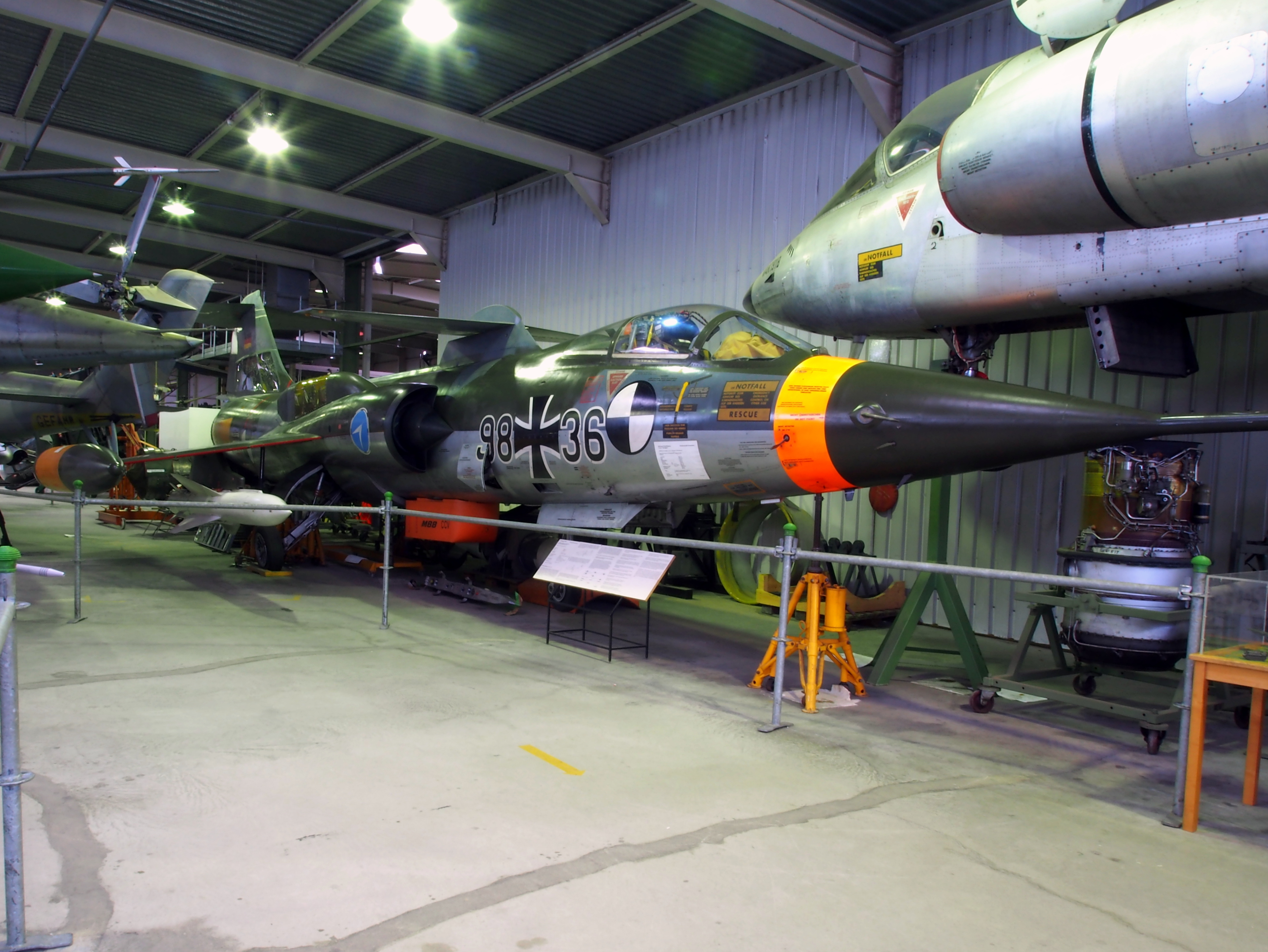
F-104 Starfighter

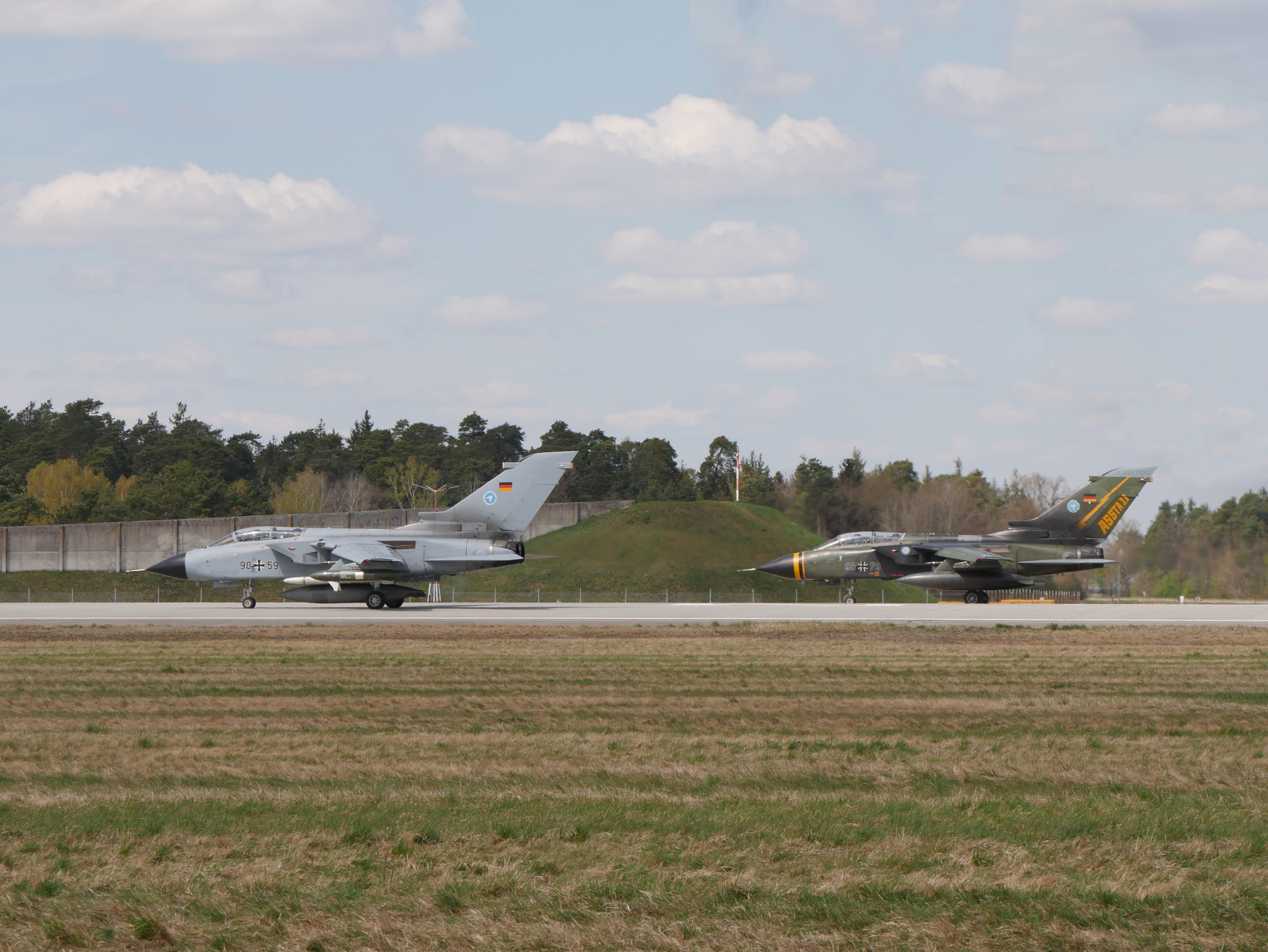
Panavia Tornado ECR and IDS of WTD 61 in Manching

The Bundeswehr Technical and Airworthiness Center for Aircraft (German: Wehrtechnische Dienststelle für Luftfahrzeuge – Musterprüfwesen für Luftfahrtgerät der Bundeswehr) or (German: Wehrtechnische Dienststelle 61 (WTD 61)) is one of several testing centres of the German Armed Forces. Its tasks are the testing and evaluating of military aircraft and aerial weapon systems. The centre is also responsible for certifications and inspections of modifications made on aircraft already in service with the German Armed Forces. The Bundeswehr Technical and Airworthiness Center for Aircraft is not integrated into the command structure of the military branches of the German Armed Forces but is a branch of Federal Office of Bundeswehr Equipment, Information Technology and In-Service Support (Bundesamt für Ausrüstung, Informationstechnik und Nutzung der Bundeswehr (BAAINBw)) which is directly subordinate to the Federal Ministry of Defence. Founded in 1957, the centre is based at Manching Air Base. The unit has a strength of about 650 personnel, 50 of which are members of the armed forces, the rest are civilian.

== Tasks ==
The responsibility of the Bundeswehr Technical and Airworthiness Center for Aircraft is to ensure that only safe, effective and efficient weapon systems are introduced into service with the German Armed Forces and to evaluate if the systems tested fulfil the requirements expected. The centre also carries out trials on and evaluations of weapon systems which are not planned to become part of the German Armed Forces inventory. Notably, this happened after the German reunification in 1990, when a large variety of former East German aircraft from the National People's Army became available.

The specific tasks of Bundeswehr Technical and Airworthiness Center for Aircraft are defined as:

- Processing of research and technology proposals
- Testing and evaluation
- Sample inspection and approval
- Technical processing and consultancy of project and usage management
- Operating of Manching Air Base including its own air space
- Operating of measuring instruments and installations including data analysis
- Operating of instrumented test carriers accompanied by test crews and flight trial engineers
- Basic and advanced training

== Structure ==
The Bundeswehr Technical and Airworthiness Center for Aircraft has a number of subdivisions. Each subdivision is assigned a specialist task. Within each subdivision there are further specialised departments.

- Staff department
- Occupational health and safety practitioner
- Prototype and flight approval office
- Technical operations service division
- Prototype inspection division
- Flight testing division
- Specialised technical department overall systems and engines
- Specialised technical department mission systems and avionics
- Administrative services unit

== History ==
As the earlier Erprobungsstelle Rechlin central military aviation test facility of the defunct Third Reich was well inside East German borders after 1945, following the foundation of the modern German Armed Forces (Bundeswehr) in November 1955, the need for a new institution to test military aircraft became apparent. In 1957 the Testing Centre for Military Aerial Equipment (Erprobungsstelle für militärisches Luftgerät) was founded, the predecessor of the Bundeswehr Technical and Airworthiness Center for Aircraft. The centre was based at Oberpfaffenhofen Airfield. Initially, the tasks of this new centre were to create the structure and procedures for the testing centre. Once this was completed, the centre was operational and began the testing and evaluation procedure of aerial military equipment selected for possible procurement by the German Armed Forces. Parts of the testing centre were relocated to Manching Air Base in 1967. The fact that Manching Air Base was also used by Reconnaissance Wing 51 at that time, restricted the testing of new aircraft. Consequently, in 1968, a new airfield was selected, Giebelstadt Airport, to house the units previously based at Manching Air Base. In 1969, all units of the testing centre were concentrated at Manching Air Base. In 1987, the centre was renamed Wehrtechnische Dienststelle für Luftfahrzeuge – Musterprüfwesen für Luftfahrtgerät der Bundeswehr (Wehrtechnische Dienstelle 61 (WTD 61)).

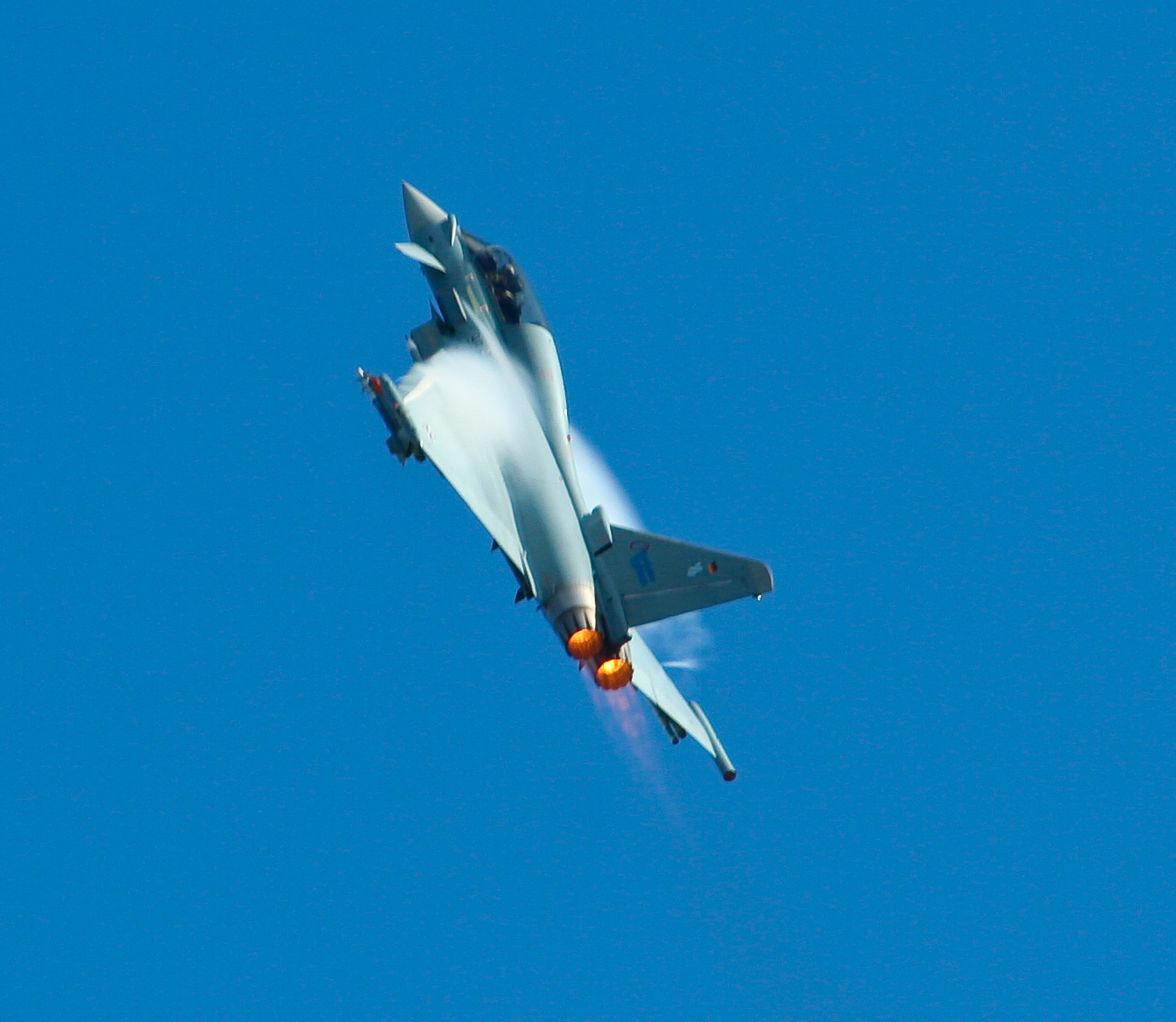
Eurofighter Typhoon, being tested by WTD 61

== Current projects ==
Amongst other projects, the Bundeswehr Technical and Airworthiness Center for Aircraft is currently engaged in testing, evaluating and developing the following systems:

- Eurofighter Typhoon, Multirole combat aircraft
- Eurocopter Tiger, attack helicopter
- Airbus A400M Atlas, turboprop military transport aircraft
- European Technology Acquisition Programm (ETAP), technology programme for the development of a future fighter jet; WTD 61 is responsible for the engine
- NHIndustries NH90, multirole helicopter
- Integrated Helmet System (IHS) for helicopter pilots on NH90 and Tiger
- Eurojet EJ200, turbofan used in Eurofighter Typhoon
- MTR MTR390, turboshaft used in Eurocopter Tiger
- Unmanned aerial vehicles, research and development of reconnaissance drones, attack drones and target drones
- Airbus A310 MRTT, aerial refuelling tanker aircraft

== See also ==
- Rechlin-Lärz Airfield, location of the predecessor Erprobungstelle Rechlin central aviation test facility of the Luftwaffe
- US Air Force Test Center
- RAF Air Warfare Centre
