= Mirower See =

Lake in Germany

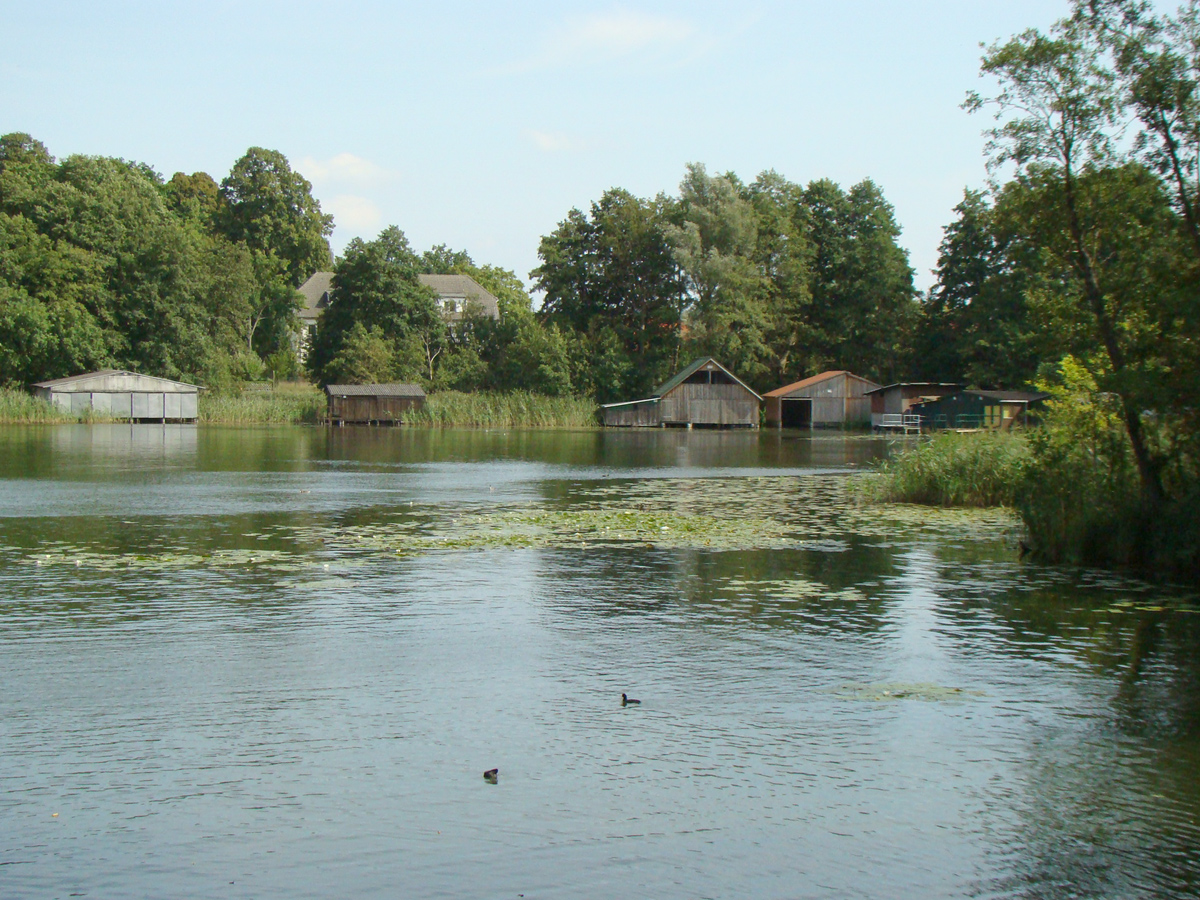

- Location within Mecklenburg-Vorpommern
- Location: Mecklenburgische Seenplatte, Mecklenburg-Vorpommern
- Coordinates: 53°16′53″N 12°48′26″E
- Primary inflows: Granzower Möschen
- Basin countries: Germany
- Surface area: 1.02 km^{2} (0.39 mi^{2})
- Max. depth: 7 m (23 ft)
- Surface elevation: 58.6 m (192 ft)
- Settlements: Mirow

Mirower See is a lake in the Mecklenburgische Seenplatte district in Mecklenburg-Vorpommern, Germany. At an elevation of 58.6 metres (192 ft), its surface area is 1.02 square kilometres (0.39 mi^{2}).
