= Walter Gotsmann =

German teacher and painter (1891–1961)

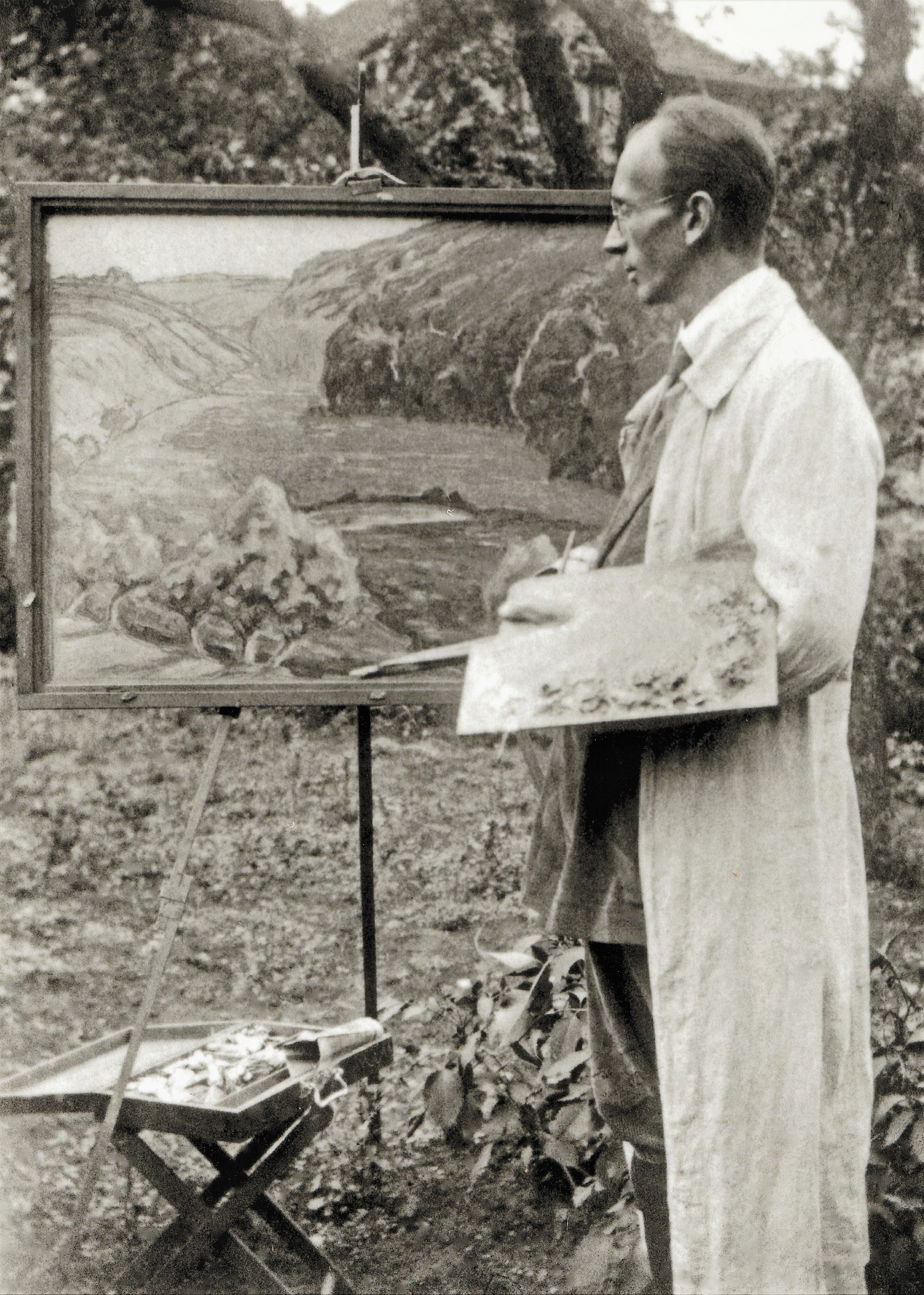
- Walter Gotsmann at his easel
- Born: October 29, 1891; Granzow (Mirow), German Empire
- Died: July 18, 1961 (aged 69); Neustrelitz, East Germany
- Occupations: Painter; art teacher; conservationist

Walter Gotsmann (8 January 1891 – 18 July 1961) was a German painter, art teacher, and conservationist.

== Life ==
Born the son of a teacher, Wilhelm Gotsmann, in Granzow, Mirow, Walter Gotsmann attended the Mirow teacher's training college from 1905 to 1910, where he received training as a primary school teacher. In 1910 he began teaching in Neucanow. He was appointed lecturer for art history at the Neustrelitz Adult Education Center during the Second World War.

Walter Gotsmann was appointed honorary district commissioner for nature conservation in 1947.

In honor of the achievements of Walter Gotsmann, the city of Neubrandenburg named a street Walter-Gotsmann-Weg. The city of Mirow also has a street named Walter-Gotsmann-Straße, in the Granzow district where Gotsmann was born. There is a Walter Gotsmann memorial stone on the Hellberge mountain near Wendfeld. There is a Walter Gotsmann nature trail in Serrahn.

The children of Walter Gotsmann have handed over his entire artistic and written legacy to the city of Neustrelitz, which has been kept and looked after since 2016 in the Karbe Wagner Archive and museum of the city's cultural association, Kulturquartier Mecklenburg-Strelitz.

== Works ==
Illustrated Books

- Picturesque Strelitzer Land. Hinstorff, o. O. 1996, ISBN 3-356-00673-8
