= Kleine Müritz =

Lake in Mecklenburg-Vorpommern, Germany

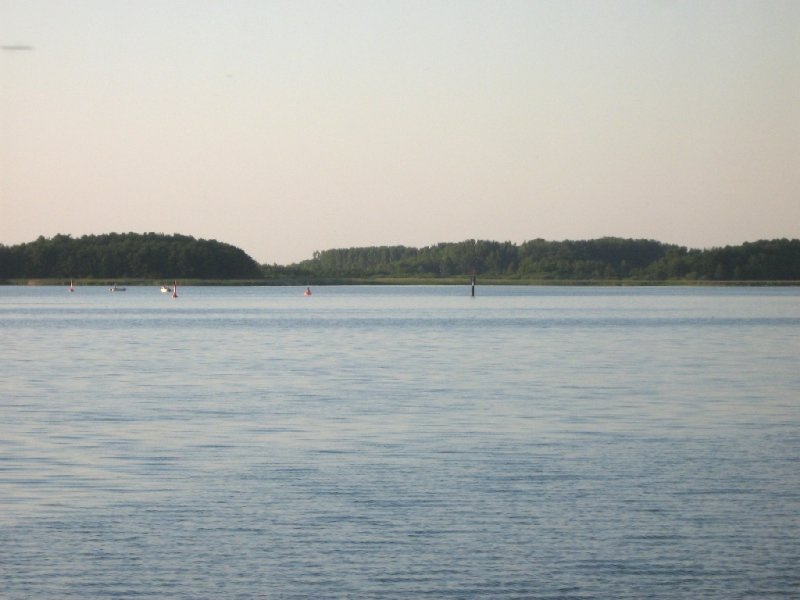

- Location within Mecklenburg-Vorpommern
- Location: Mecklenburg-Vorpommern
- Coordinates: 53°19′50″N 12°42′20″E
- Primary inflows: Müritz
- Primary outflows: Elde
- Basin countries: Germany
- Surface area: 4 km^{2} (1.5 sq mi)
- Surface elevation: 62.1 m (204 ft)
- Settlements: Rechlin, Vipperow

Kleine Müritz is a lake in Mecklenburg-Vorpommern, Germany. At an elevation of 62.1 m, its surface area is 4 km^{2}.
