= Vilzsee =

Lake in Germany

- Location within Mecklenburg-Vorpommern
- Location: Mecklenburgische Seenplatte, Mecklenburg-Vorpommern
- Coordinates: 53°12′39.5″N 12°50′0″E
- Primary inflows: Müritz–Havel–Wasserstraße
- Primary outflows: Oberbek
- Basin countries: Germany
- Surface area: 2.2 km^{2} (0.85 mi^{2})
- Surface elevation: 58.5 m (192 ft)

Vilzsee is a lake in the Mecklenburgische Seenplatte district in Mecklenburg-Vorpommern, Germany. At an elevation of 58.5 metres (192 ft), its surface covers 2.2 square kilometres (0.85 mi^{2}).
