= Roggentin (Mirow) =

- Ortsteil of Mirow
- Interactive map of Roggentin
- Location within Germany Location within Mecklenburg-Vorpommern
- Coordinates: 53°19′N 12°53′E
- Country: Germany
- State: Mecklenburg-Vorpommern
- District: Mecklenburgische Seenplatte
- Town: Mirow

Area
  - Total: 72.29 km^{2} (27.91 sq mi)
- Elevation: 77 m (253 ft)

Population (2012-12-31)
  - Total: 618
  - Density: 8.55/km^{2} (22.1/sq mi)
- Time zone: UTC+01:00 (CET)
  - Summer (DST): UTC+02:00 (CEST)
- Postal codes: 17252
- Dialling codes: 039829, 039833
- Vehicle registration: MST

Roggentin is a village and a former municipality in the Mecklenburgische Seenplatte district, in Mecklenburg-Vorpommern, Germany. Since 25 May 2014, it is part of the town Mirow.
