= Mirow =

Town in Mecklenburg-Vorpommern, Germany

- Town
- Coat of arms

- Location of Mirow within Mecklenburgische Seenplatte district
- Interactive map of Mirow
- Location within Germany Location within Mecklenburg-Vorpommern
- Coordinates: 53°16′N 12°48′E
- Country: Germany
- State: Mecklenburg-Vorpommern
- District: Mecklenburgische Seenplatte
- Municipal assoc.: Mecklenburgische Kleinseenplatte

Government
  - Mayor: Henry Tesch (CDU)

Area
  - Total: 158.32 km^{2} (61.13 sq mi)
- Elevation: 63 m (207 ft)

Population (2025-12-31)
  - Total: 3,671
  - Density: 23.19/km^{2} (60.05/sq mi)
- Time zone: UTC+01:00 (CET)
  - Summer (DST): UTC+02:00 (CEST)
- Postal codes: 17252
- Dialling codes: 039833
- Vehicle registration: MST
- Website: www.amt-mecklenburgische-kleinseenplatte.de/

Mirow (German pronunciation: [ˈmiːʁoː]) is a town in the district of Mecklenburgische Seenplatte in southern Mecklenburg-Vorpommern, Germany.

== Etymology ==
"Mir" in Slavonic languages means "peace" or "glory". The name "Mirow" was derived from "villa mirowe", translating as "location of peace".

== Geography ==
Mirow lies in the middle of the Mecklenburg Lake District (Mecklenburgische Seenplatte) on the southern shore of Lake Mirow, which is connected to the Müritz and the Havel by a system of lakes, rivers, and canals. There are several more lakes on the territory of this municipality. The neighboring towns of Diemitz, Fleeth, Granzow, Peetsch, and Starsow were incorporated into the town in 2004 and are now part of the municipality.

=== Town division ===
The following districts belong to the town of Mirow:

- Mirow
- Babke
- Blankenförde
- Diemitz
- Fleeth
- Granzow
- Leussow
- Peetsch
- Qualzow
- Roggentin
- Schillersdorf
- Starsow

In addition, the residential areas of Mirowdorf, Blankenfelde, Hohenfelde, Birkenhof, Holm, Forsthof, Weinberg, Niemannslust, Diemitzer Schleuse, Fleether Mühle, Kakeldütt, Schillersdorfer Teerofen and Hohe Brücke are parts of the town of Mirow.

== History ==
In 1227, the Order of Saint John founded a commandry on the shore of Lake Mirow after Lord Borwin II had given them land there; the first quarter of the coat-of-arms of the town still displays the cross of the Johanniterorden (the Order of Saint John) in commemoration of that gift. In 1701, the town became part of the duchy of Mecklenburg-Strelitz. In 1919, it gained town privileges. Mirow is the birthplace of Charlotte of Mecklenburg-Strelitz, Queen consort of George III of the United Kingdom.

The baroque palace, under construction from 1749 to 1760, was designed by Christoph Julius Löwe. It is notable for a ballroom with stucco decoration, and for the Red Salon lined with silk Chinese-style wallpaper. The English-style park of the palace includes the burial place of the last reigning Grand Duke of Mecklenburg-Strelitz, who died in 1918. The grand-ducal tomb is situated in the Gothic Church of Saint John, which was rebuilt after its complete destruction in 1945.

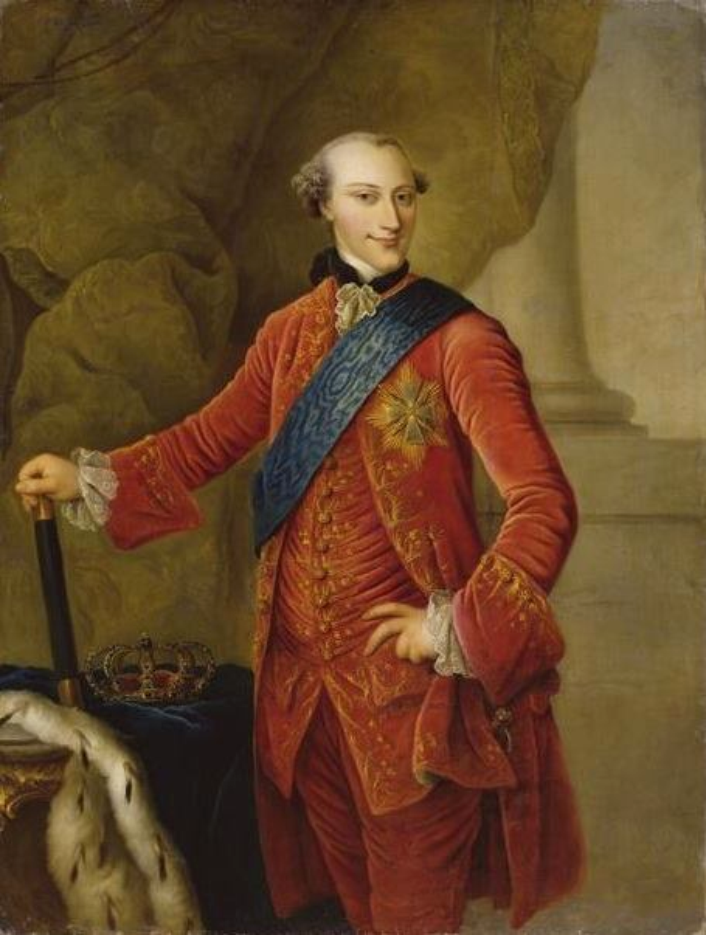
Duke Adolphus Frederick IV of Mecklenburg-Strelitz

== Notable people ==
- Ludwig Giesebrecht (1792–1873), a German poet and historian.
- Walter Gotsmann (1891–1961), a German painter, art teacher and conservationist.

=== Aristocracy ===
- Adolphus Frederick IV (1738–1794), Duke of Mecklenburg-Strelitz from 1752 to 1794.
- Charles II, Grand Duke of Mecklenburg-Strelitz (1741–1816), duke & grand duke of Mecklenburg-Strelitz from 1794 to 1816.
- Charlotte of Mecklenburg-Strelitz (1744–1818), Queen of Great Britain and Ireland, wife of King George III
- Duke George Augustus of Mecklenburg (1748–1785), a German nobleman, sailor and soldier.

== Gallery ==
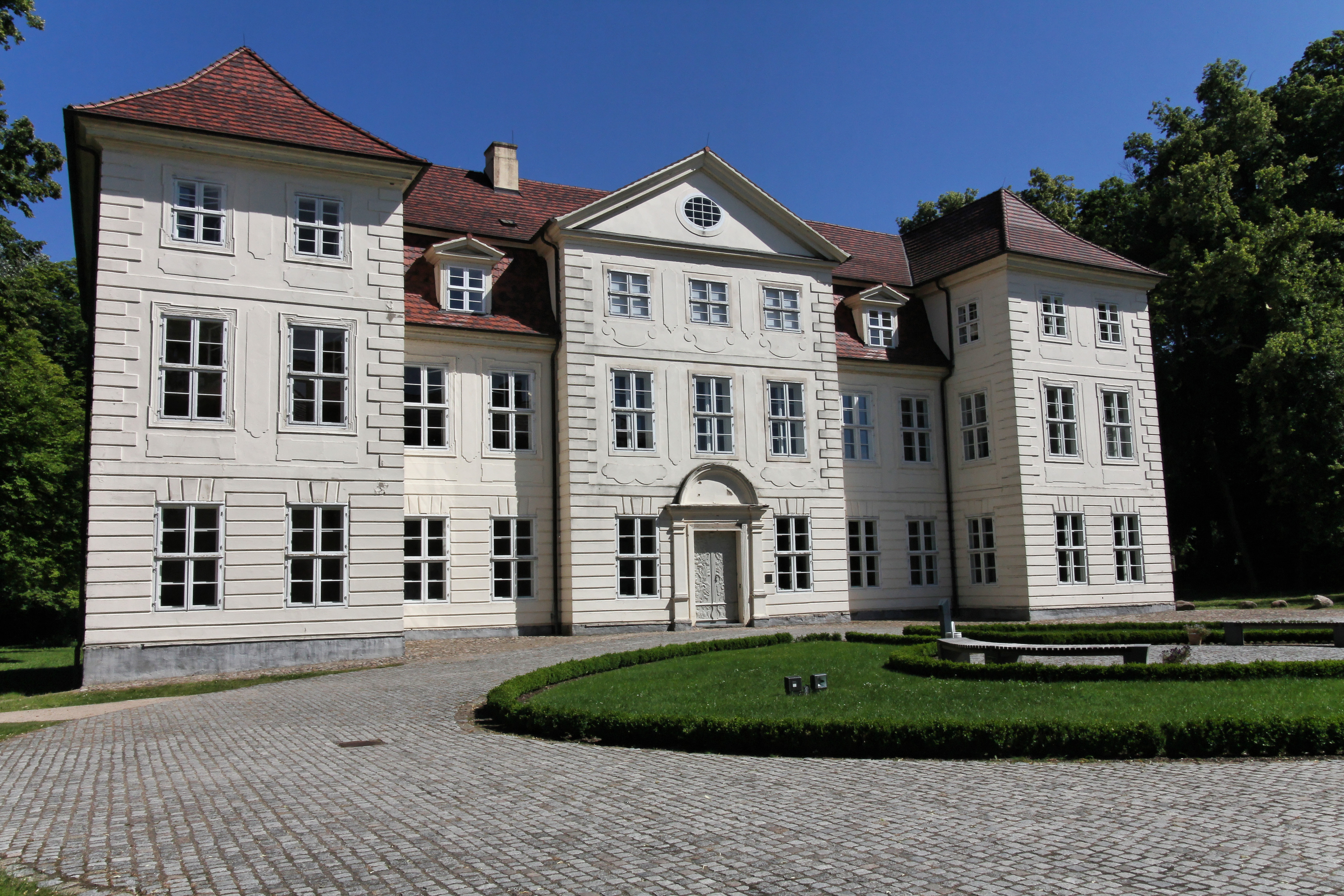
Baroque and early Classicist Mirow Castle, standing on the Castle Island inside the lake Mirower See

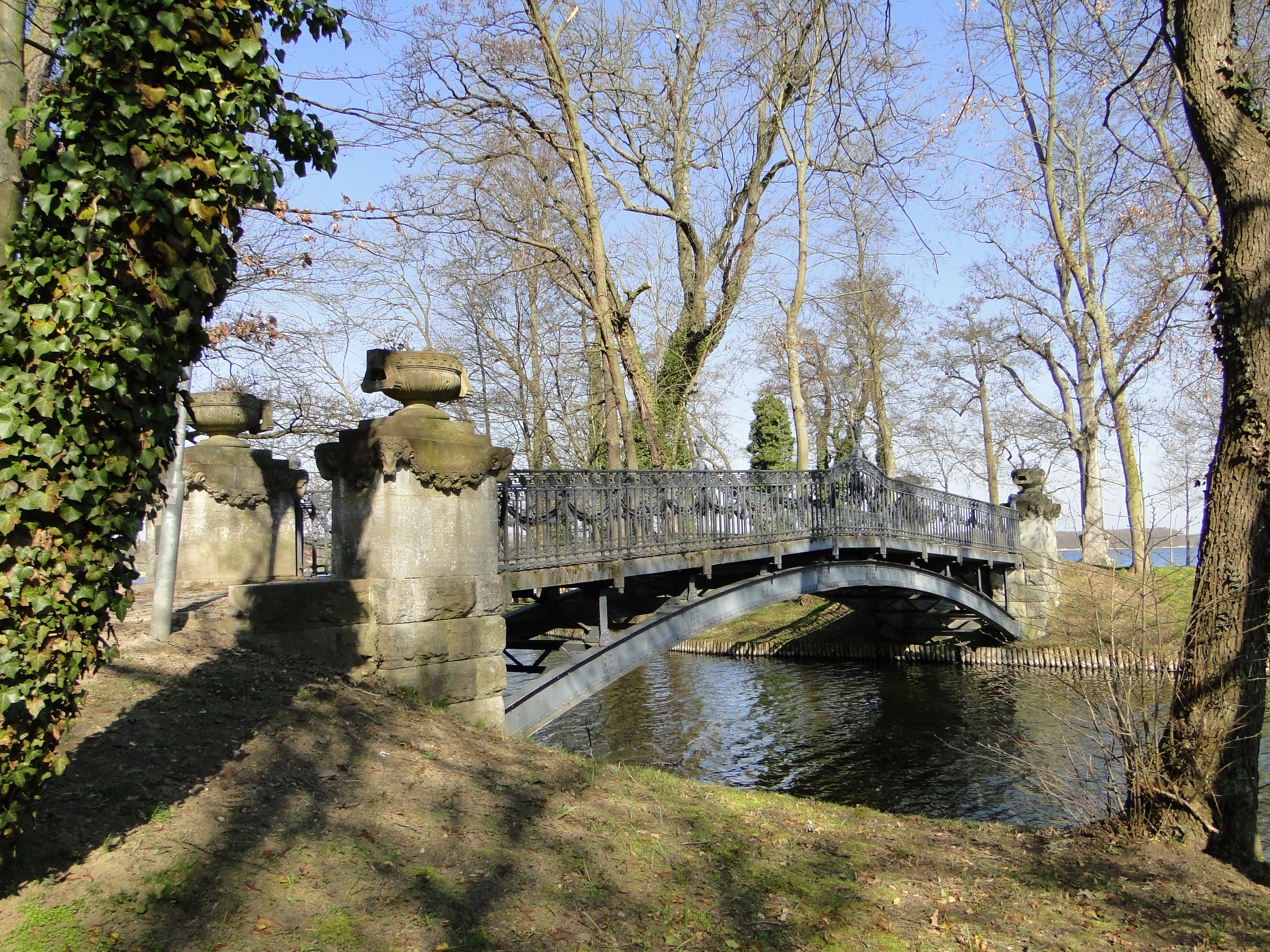
Bridge connecting Mirow's Castle Island to Love Island

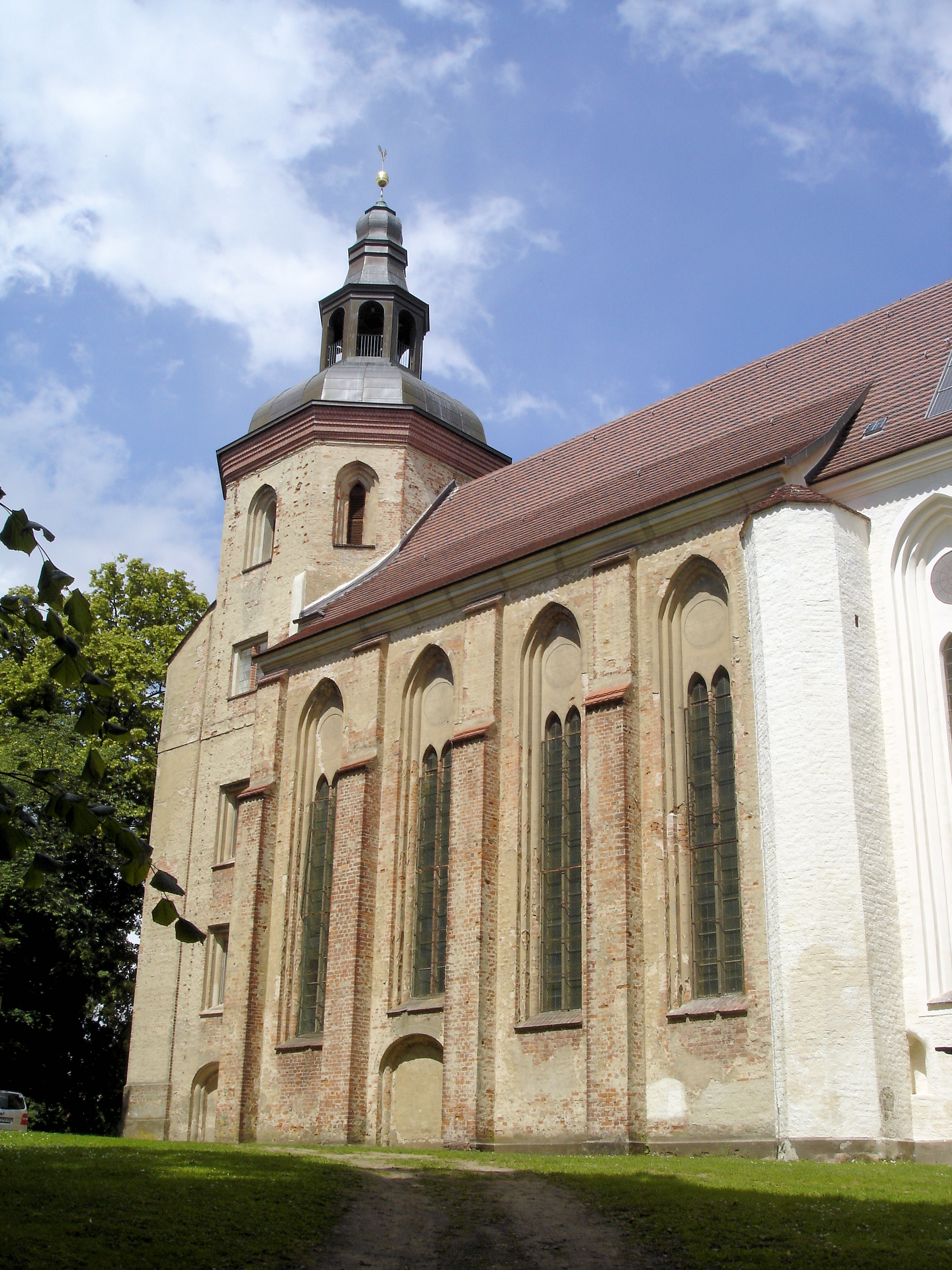
Castle Church of Mirow

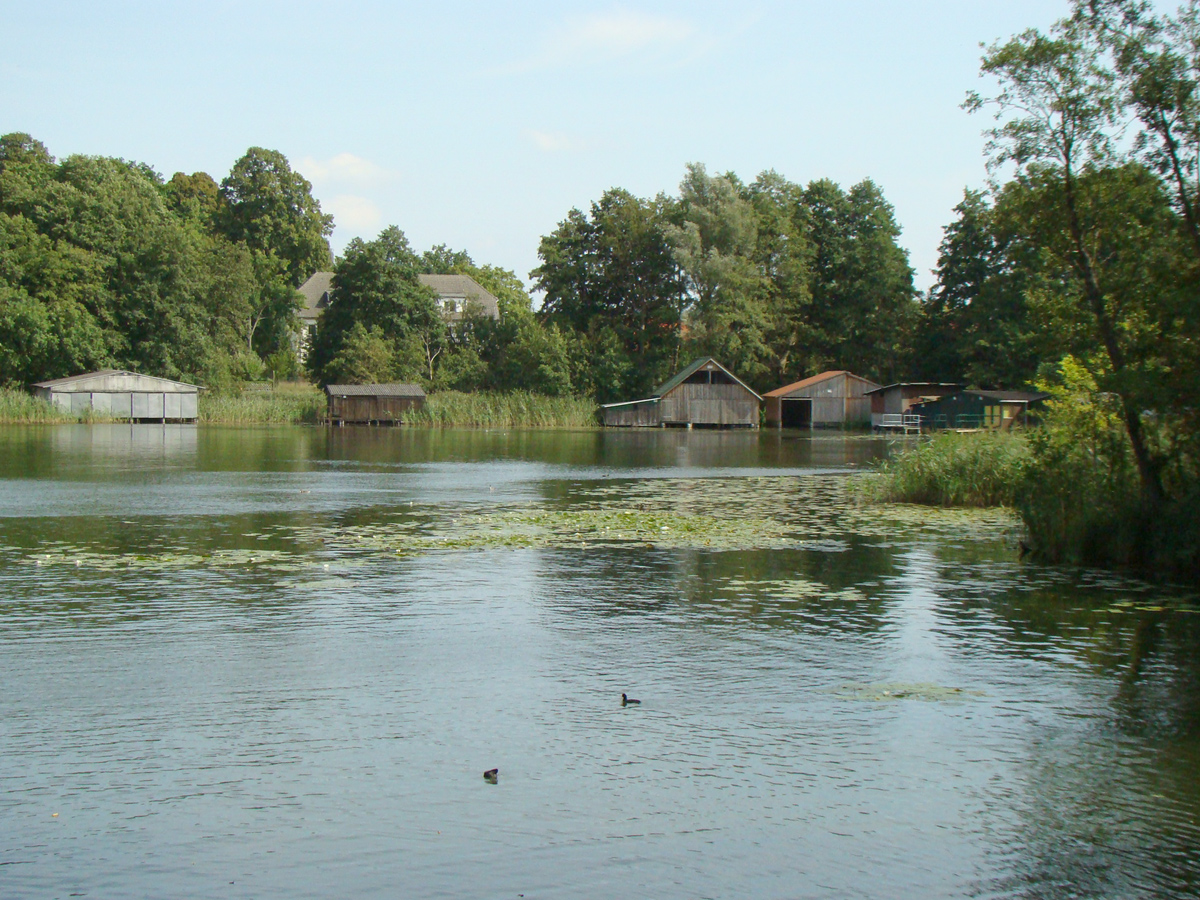
Boat houses at Mirower See

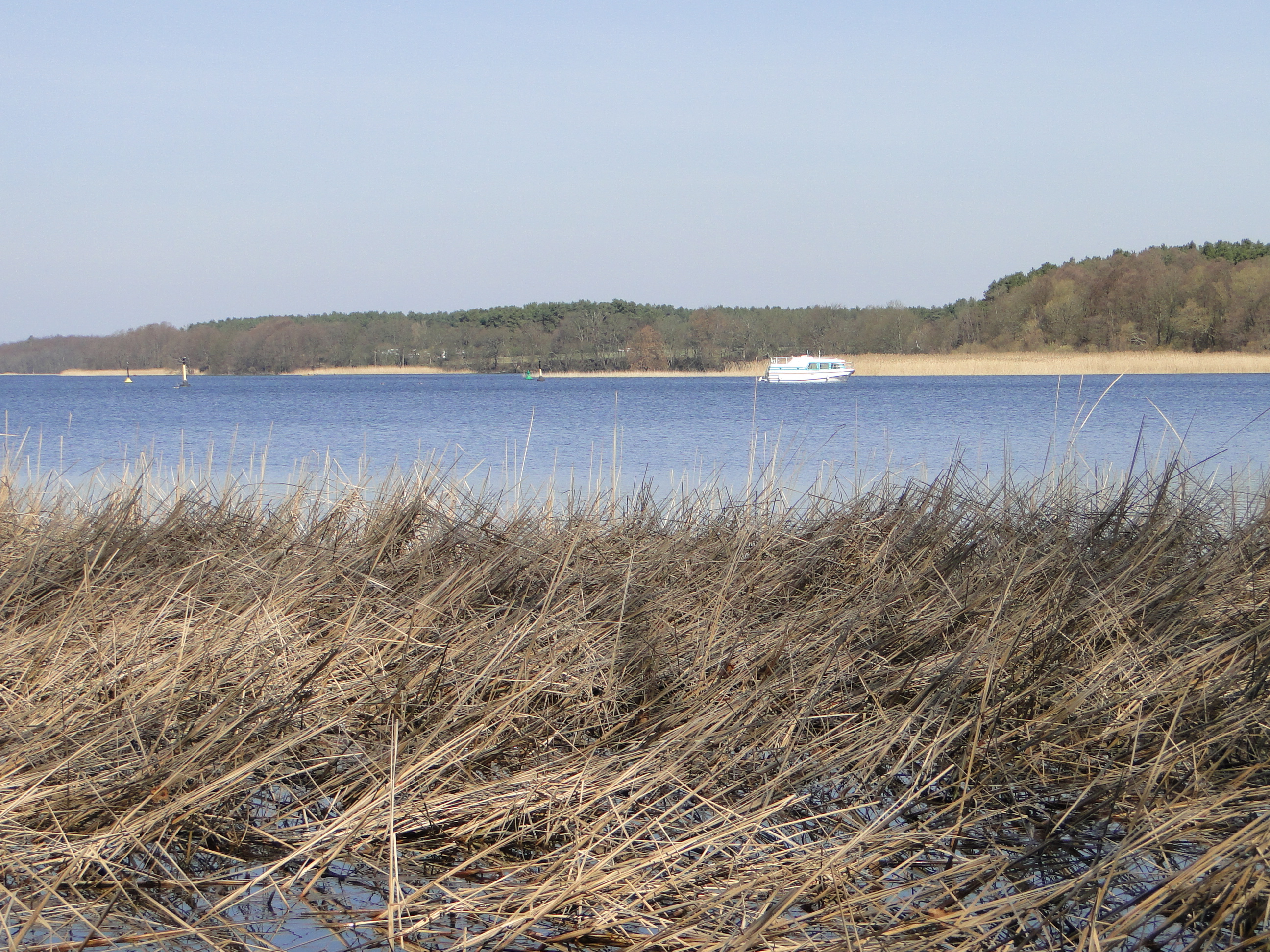
Vilzsee

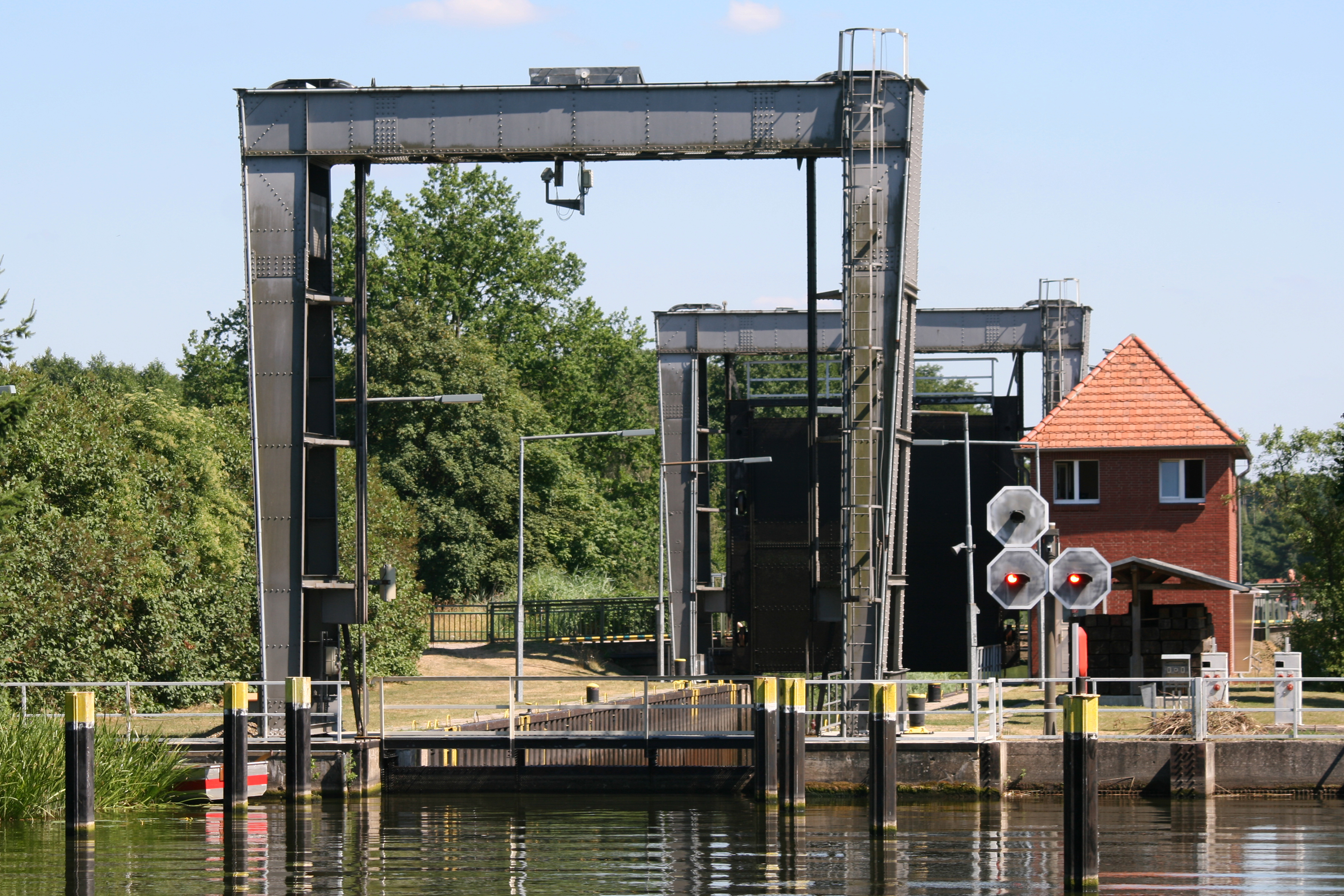
Watergate at Müritz-Elde waterway
