= Ingolstadt Manching Airport =

Ingolstadt Manching Airfield Fliegerhorst Ingolstadt/Manching
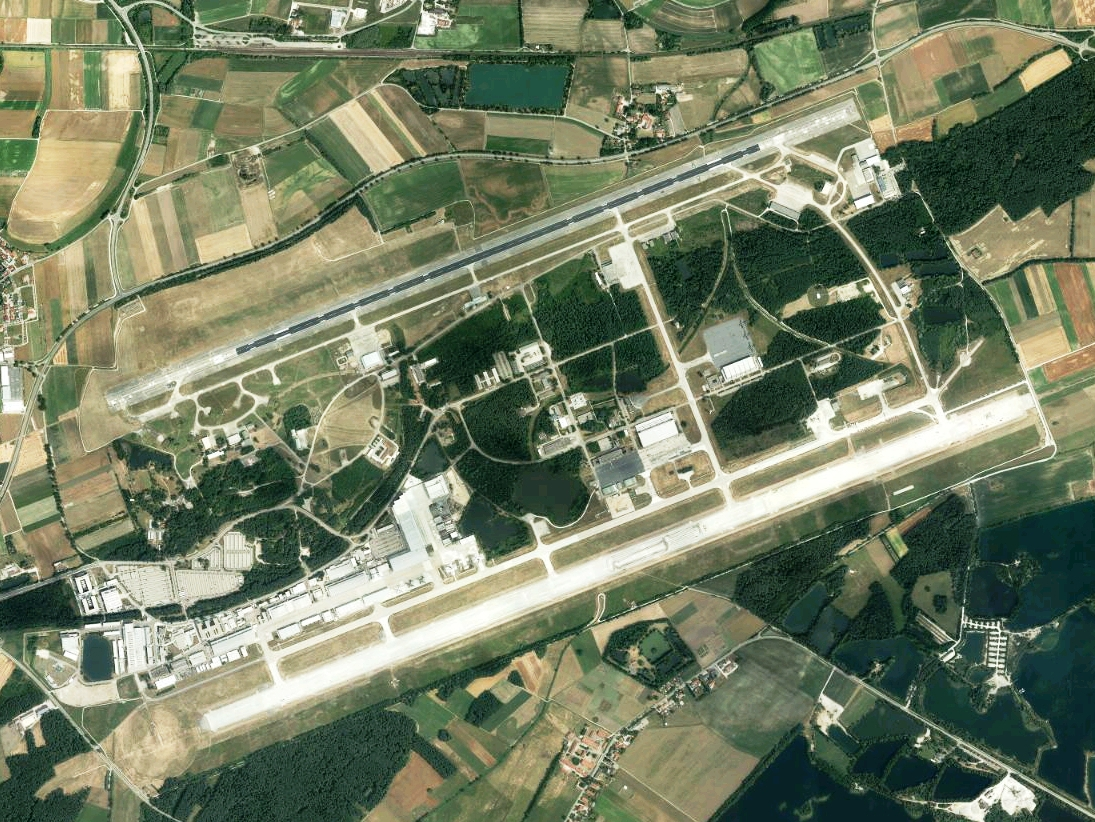
- IATA: IGS; ICAO: ETSI

Summary
- Serves: Ingolstadt, Germany
- Location: Manching, Bavaria, Germany
- Elevation AMSL: 1,202 ft (366 m)
- Coordinates: 48°42.9′N 11°32.1′E
- Website: etsi-airport.de
- Interactive map of Ingolstadt Manching Airfield

Runways
Direction	Length		Surface
Direction	m	ft	Surface
06R/24L	2,940	9,645	Concrete
06L/24R	2,439	8,002	Concrete

Ingolstadt Manching Airfield, or Flugplatz Ingolstadt/Manching in German (IATA: IGS, ICAO: ETSI), is a military airbase with civil usage located in Manching near Ingolstadt, Germany.

== Usage ==
The airfield is home to the Bundeswehr Technical and Airworthiness Center for Aircraft. The first flights of the Panavia Tornado and Eurofighter prototypes took place here. The F-104G Starfighter and the F-4 Phantom II fighter aircraft were flown here testing weapons systems in the 1960s, 70s and 80s. During the Space Shuttle missions it was considered as a landing site for Transoceanic Abort Landings.

Cassidian, the defence and security subsidiary of EADS (now renamed Airbus Defence and Space), also had its headquarters here. Manching is now a key center for Airbus' military air systems activity in Germany, including supporting Luftwaffe aircraft.

== Airlines and destinations ==
Private Wings offers some business on-demand charters and seasonal scheduled leisure flights across Europe. Ingolstadt Manching also receives frequent charter flights from Braunschweig-Wolfsburg Airport transferring personnel of the Volkswagen Group between their headquarters in Wolfsburg and their subsidiary Audi in Ingolstadt.

== See also ==
- Transport in Germany
- List of airports in Germany
