= Dollbek =

River in Germany

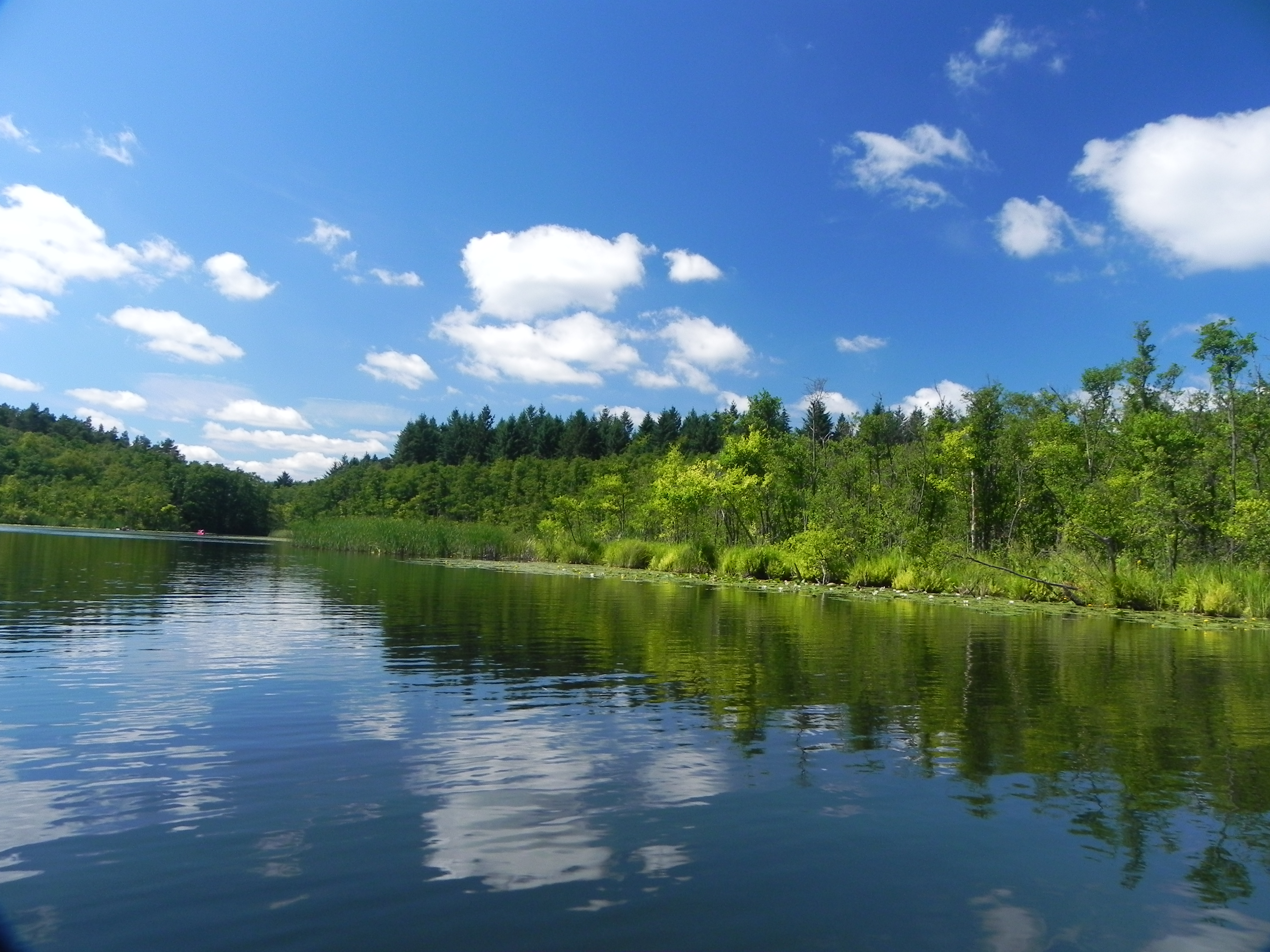

Location
- Country: Germany
- State: Mecklenburg-Vorpommern

Physical characteristics
- Source
  - location: Gobenowsee
- Mouth
  - location: Labussee
  - coordinates: 53.2118°N 12.9057°E

Basin features
- Progression: Müritz-Havel-Wasserstraße→ Havel→ Elbe→ North Sea

Dollbek is a river of Mecklenburg-Vorpommern, Germany. It connects the Gobenowsee with the Labussee.

== See also ==
- List of rivers of Mecklenburg-Vorpommern
