= Labussee =

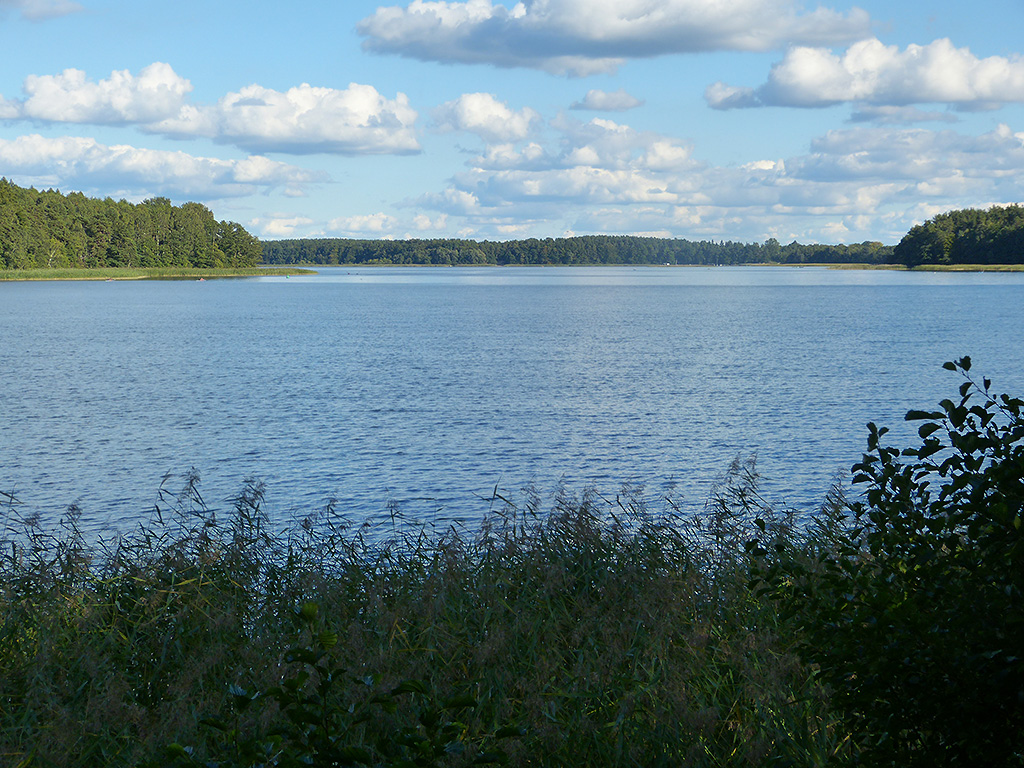

- Location within Mecklenburg-Vorpommern
- Location: Mecklenburgische Seenplatte, Mecklenburg-Vorpommern
- Coordinates: 53°12′18″N 12°53′30″E
- Type: Natural freshwater lake
- Primary inflows: Müritz–Havel–Wasserstraße
- Primary outflows: Müritz–Havel–Wasserstraße
- Basin countries: Germany
- Max. length: 2.95 km (1.83 mi)
- Max. width: 1.14 km (0.71 mi)
- Surface area: 2.51 km^{2} (0.97 mi^{2})
- Surface elevation: 57.5 m (189 ft)

Labussee is a lake in the Mecklenburgische Seenplatte district in Mecklenburg-Vorpommern, Germany. At an elevation of 57.5 metres (189 ft), its surface area is 2.51 square kilometres (0.97 mi^{2}).
