= Thüren =

Lake in Germany

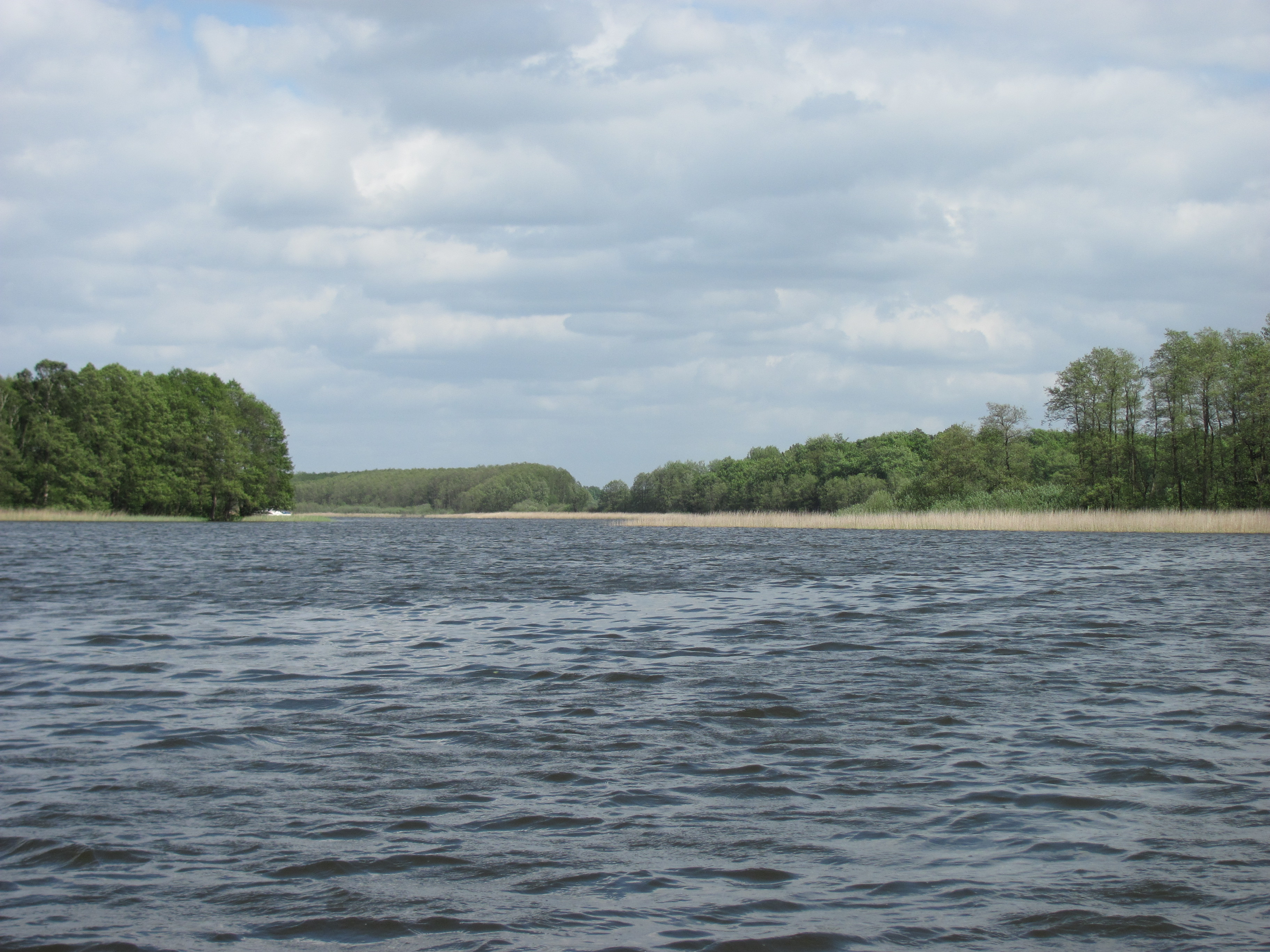

- Location within Mecklenburg-Vorpommern
- Location: Mecklenburgische Seenplatte, Mecklenburg-Vorpommern
- Coordinates: 53°16′50″N 12°41′50″E
- Basin countries: Germany
- Surface area: 1.72 km^{2} (0.66 sq mi)
- Max. depth: ca. 7 m (23 ft)
- Surface elevation: 62.1 m (204 ft)

Thüren is a lake in the Mecklenburgische Seenplatte district in Mecklenburg-Vorpommern, Germany. At an elevation of 62.1 m, its surface area is 1.72 km².
