= Müritzarm =

Lake in Germany

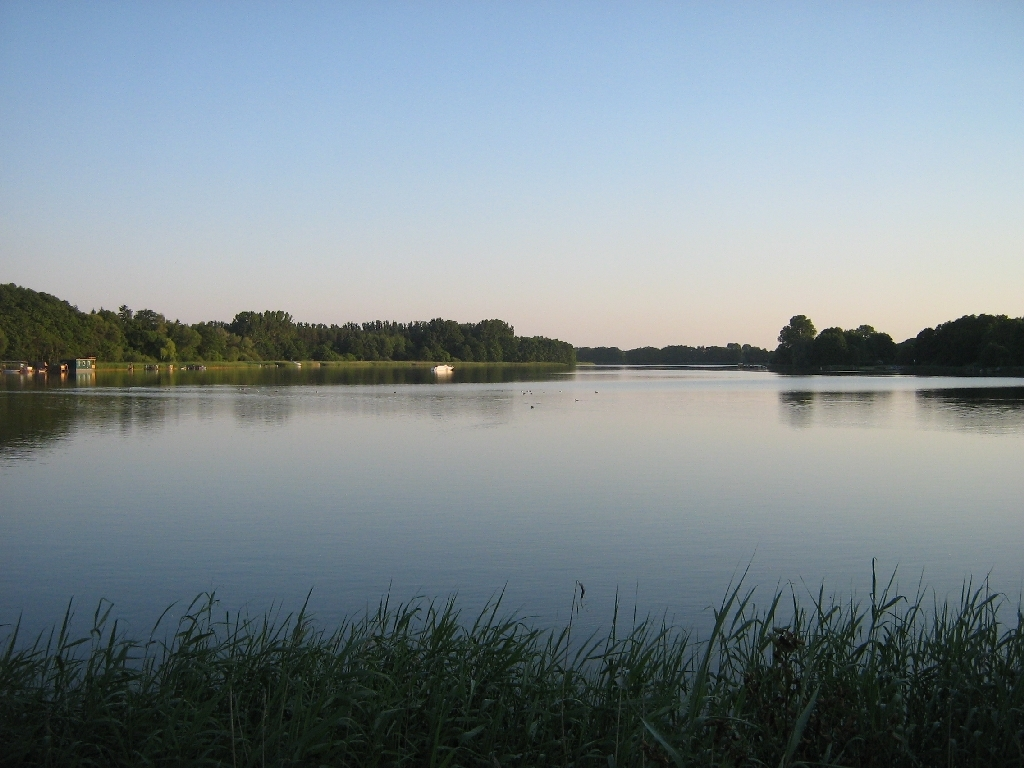

- Location within Mecklenburg-Vorpommern
- Location: Mecklenburgische Seenplatte, Mecklenburg-Vorpommern
- Coordinates: 53°18′50.98″N 12°41′7.56″E
- Basin countries: Germany
- Surface area: 1.23 km^{2} (0.47 sq mi)
- Surface elevation: 62.1 m (204 ft)

Müritzarm is a lake in the Mecklenburgische Seenplatte district in Mecklenburg-Vorpommern, Germany. At an elevation of 62.1 m, its surface area is 1.23 km².
