= Ludwig Giesebrecht =

German poet and historian

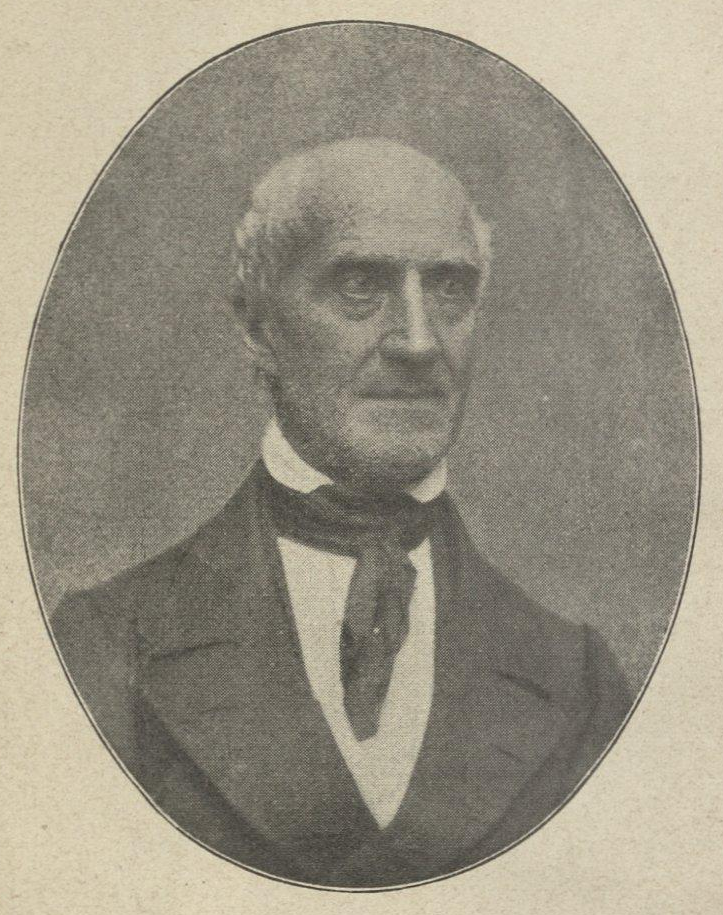
Ludwig Giesebrecht, undated portrait

Heinrich Ludwig Theodor Giesebrecht (5 July 1792 in Mirow – 18 March 1873 in Jasenitz) was a German poet and historian.

He studied history at the universities of Berlin and Greifswald, and in the meantime served as a volunteer in a Mecklenburg-Strelitz Hussar regiment during the Befreiungskriege (Wars of Liberation). From 1816 to 1866 he taught classes at the gymnasium in Stettin, attaining the title of professor in 1826. In 1848 he represented Stettin in the Frankfurt National Assembly.

He was a good friend of composer Carl Loewe, for whom he wrote the lyrics to numerous oratorios.

== Selected works ==
- Lehrbuch der alten Geschichte (1833) – Textbook of ancient history.
- Gedichte (1836) – Poetry.
- Wendische Geschichten aus den Jahren 780 bis 1182 (3 volumes, 1843) – Wendish history from the years 780–1182.
- Ueber einige Gedichte der Sibylla Schwarz (1865) – On some poems of Sibylla Schwarz.
