= Großer Weißer See =

Lake in Germany

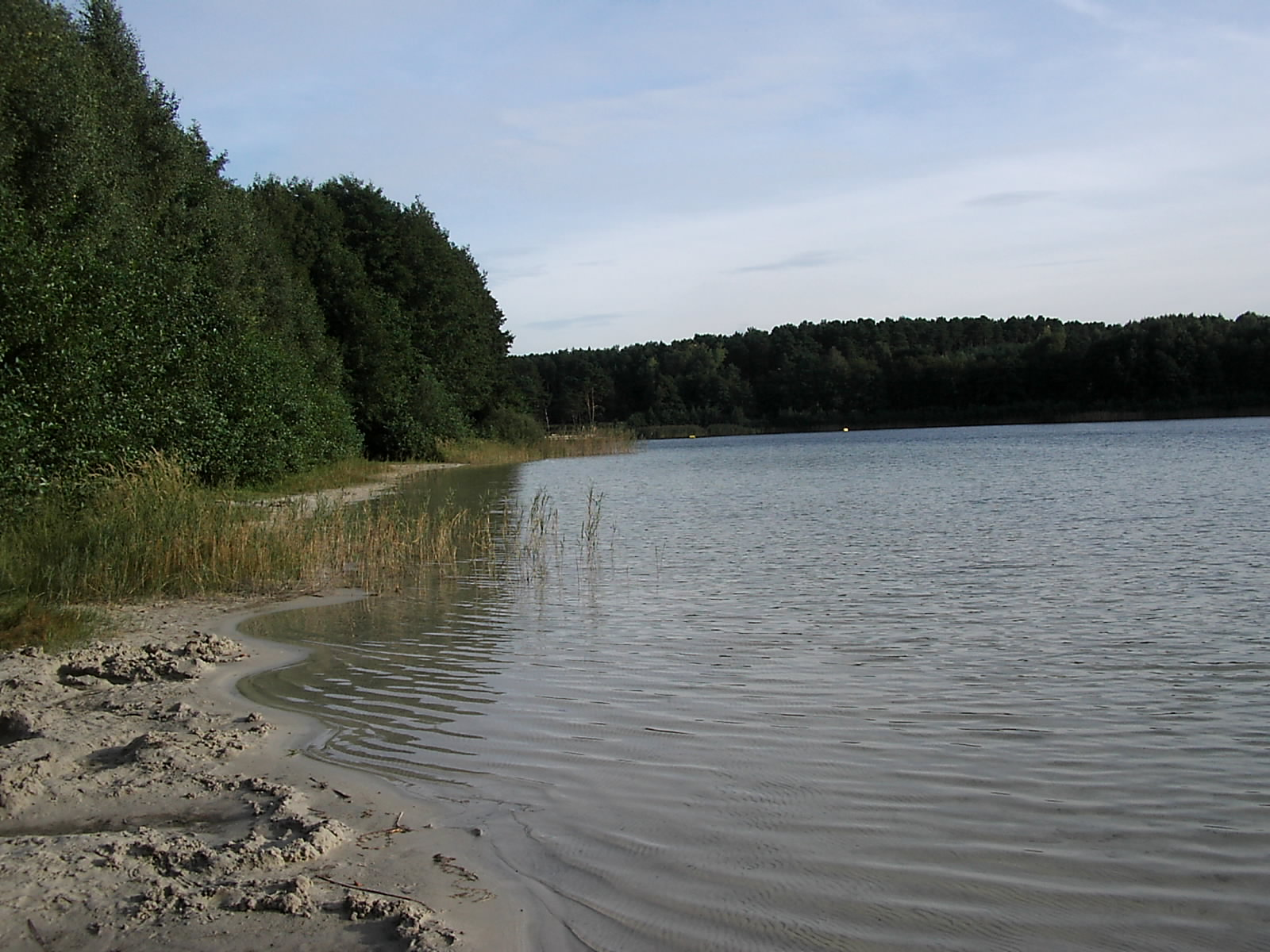

- Location within Mecklenburg-Vorpommern
- Location: Mecklenburgische Seenplatte, Mecklenburgische Seenplatte, Mecklenburg-Vorpommern
- Coordinates: 53°17′06″N 12°56′24″E
- Basin countries: Germany
- Surface area: 0.27 km^{2} (0.10 sq mi)
- Average depth: 5.7 m (19 ft)
- Max. depth: 12.2 m (40 ft)
- Surface elevation: 59.8 m (196 ft)

Großer Weißer See (English: Great White Sea) is a lake in Mecklenburgische Seenplatte, Mecklenburgische Seenplatte, Mecklenburg-Vorpommern, Germany. At an elevation of 59.8 metres (196 ft), its surface area is 0.27 square kilometres (0.10 sq mi).

== tourism ==
The development and use of the southern shore of the Großer Weißer See (Great White Lake) began as early as the late 19th century. A bathing establishment was opened there in 1893, and the old changing room building still stands today. A new restaurant was built and opened near the bathing beach in 1963. In 1970, the first public campsite opened on the western slope of the Wörlandberg hill, thus finally opening the lake to tourism. In 2013, facilities for new train stops at the Weißer See were also installed on the Neustrelitz-Mirow line.

Due to the water conditions and the good visibility at the time, GST athletes chose the lake as a training location for divers in the 1970s and 80s. The lake's water is said to have natural healing properties (natural healing spring).
