= Tiefer Trebbower See =

Lake in Germany

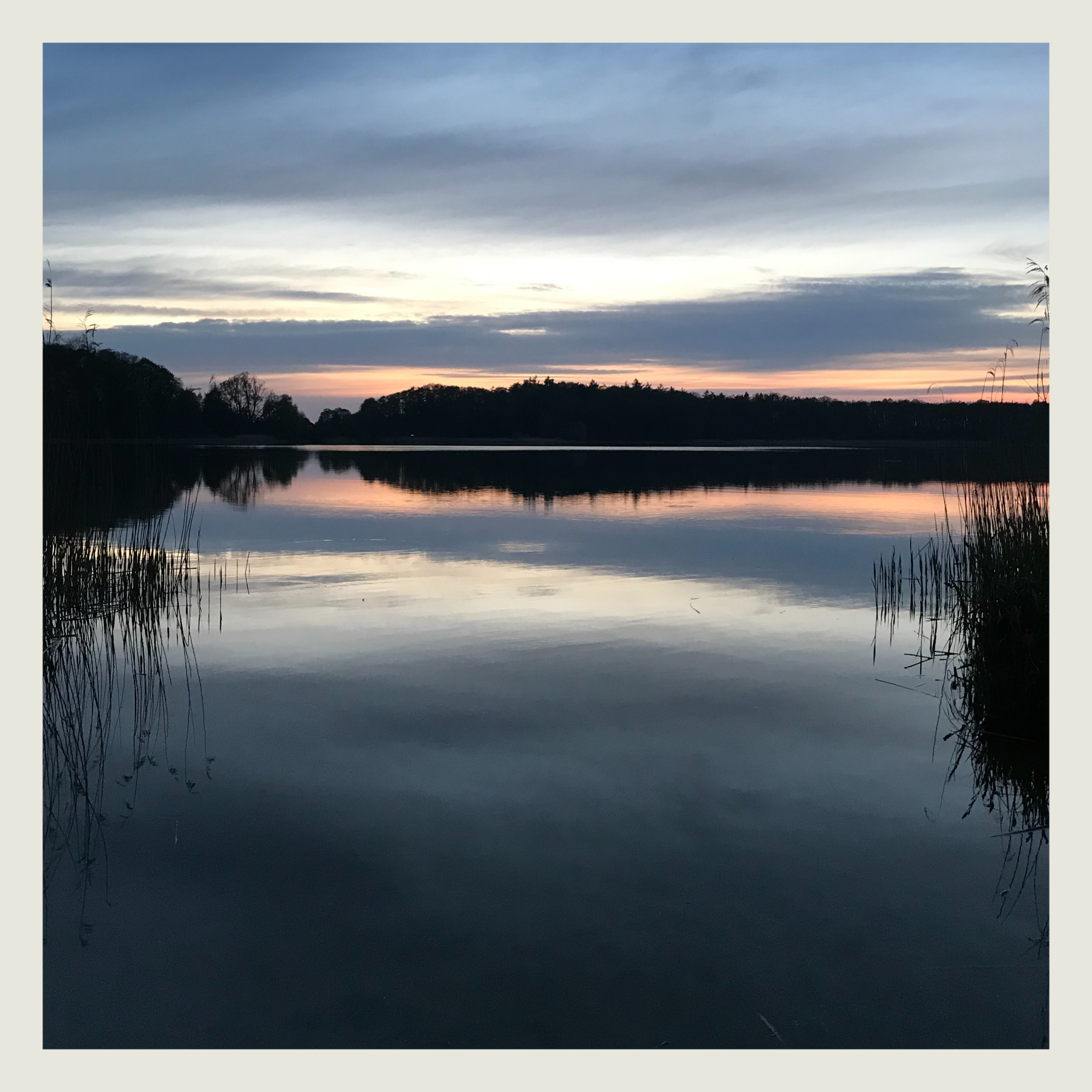

- Location within Mecklenburg-Vorpommern
- Location: Mecklenburgische Seenplatte, Mecklenburgische Seenplatte, Mecklenburg-Vorpommern
- Coordinates: 53°18′30″N 13°04′33″E
- Primary inflows: Floßgraben (Havel), Stendlitz
- Primary outflows: Floßgraben (Havel)
- Basin countries: Germany
- Surface area: 0.41 km^{2} (0.16 sq mi)
- Average depth: 1.3 m (4 ft 3 in)
- Max. depth: 2 m (6 ft 7 in)
- Surface elevation: 57.8 m (190 ft)

Tiefer Trebbower See is a lake in Mecklenburgische Seenplatte, Mecklenburgische Seenplatte, Mecklenburg-Vorpommern, Germany. At an elevation of 57.8 m, its surface area is 0.41 km².
