= Plauer See (Mecklenburg-Vorpommern) =

Lake in Mecklenburg-Vorpommern, Germany

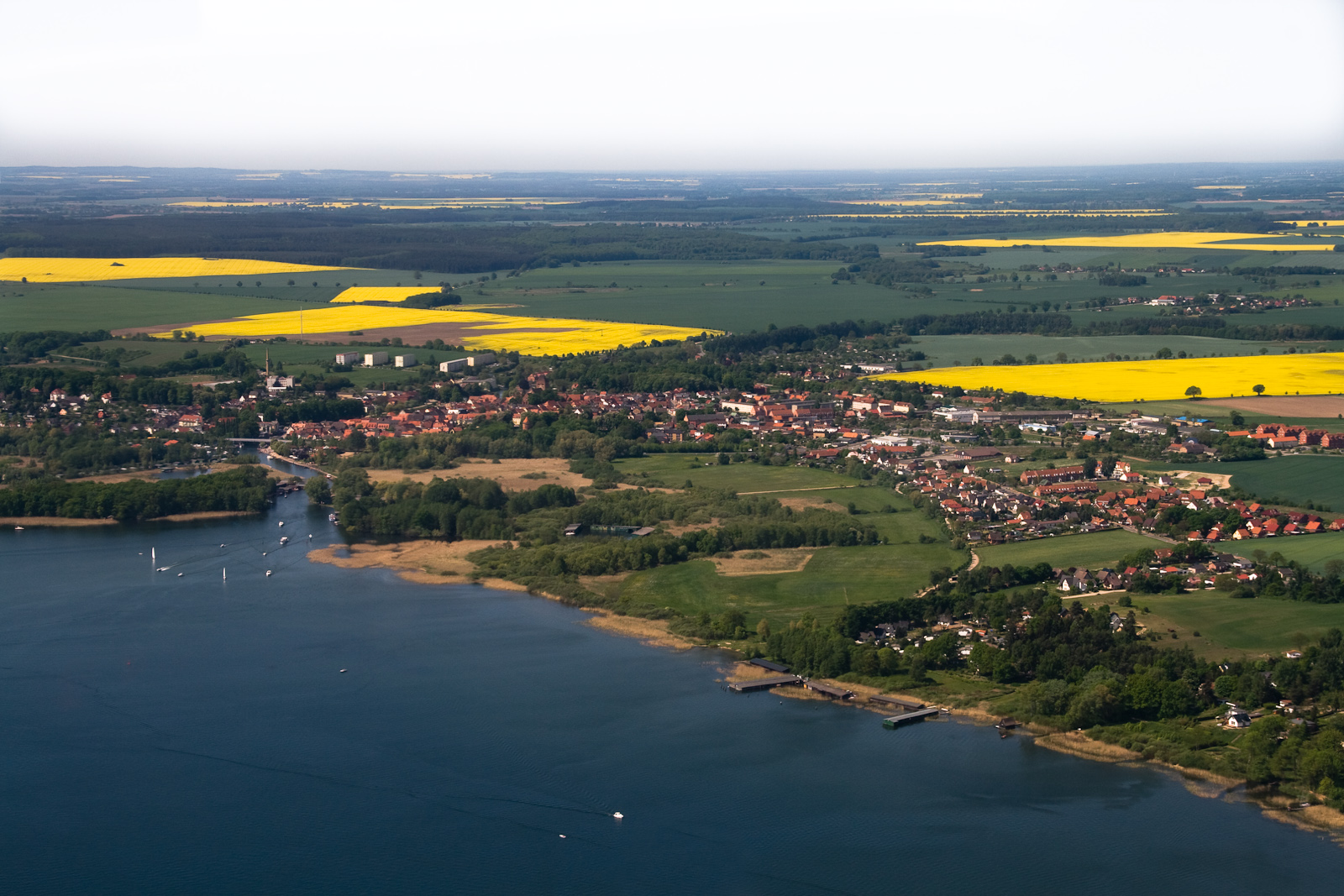
- Aerial view of Plau at the lake

- Location within Germany Location within Mecklenburg-Vorpommern
- Location: Mecklenburg-Vorpommern
- Coordinates: 53°27′57″N 12°18′27″E
- Primary inflows: Elde
- Primary outflows: Müritz–Elde–Wasserstraße
- Catchment area: 1,109 km^{2} (428 mi^{2})
- Basin countries: Germany
- Surface area: 38.4 km^{2} (14.8 sq mi)
- Average depth: 6.8 m (22 ft)
- Max. depth: 25.5 m (84 ft)
- Surface elevation: 62 m (203 ft)
- Settlements: Plau am See

Plauer See (German pronunciation: [ˈplaʊɐ ˈzeː], literally Lake of/near Plau) is a lake in Mecklenburg-Vorpommern, Germany, located at 53°27′57″N 12°18′27″E. Its surface is approximately 38.4 km^{2} and its maximum depth is 25.5 metres (84 ft).

== Location ==
The Plauer See is flowed through by the river Elde from east to west and is part of the "Bundeswasserstraße Müritz-Elde-Wasserstraße" with waterway class I; the "Wasserstraßen- und Schifffahrtsamt Lauenburg" is responsible. The Global Nature Fund awarded the water body the title Lebendiger See des Jahres 2011.

With an area of 38.4 km^{2}, the Plauer See is the third largest lake in Mecklenburg-Vorpommern and the seventh largest in Germany. It has a north–south extension of around 14 kilometres, a maximum width of 5 kilometres and an average depth of 6.8 metres. It has connections via the Elde to the Fleesensee, the Kölpinsee and the Müritz in the east and to the river Elbe in the west. On the western shore of the Plauer See lies the eponymous town of Plau am See, which is also the centre of tourism in this region. There are many tourist facilities around the Plauer See, such as the camping sites located on the eastern and northern shores, near the town of Plau and on the island of Plauer Werder in the north. The lake is surrounded by a (largely still unpaved) circular cycle path.

Lake Plauer was called Cuzhin or Kuzin in the 12th century, like the settlement and castle of the same name, Kutin or Kutsin - today's Quetzin - on the western shore of the lake. Only later was the lake given the name of the town of Plau, which lies on the shore.

The north-western part of the lake lies in the "Naturschutzgebiet Nordufer Plauer See".

== Places of interest ==
Plau Castle is a lowland castle on the west side of the lake, built in 1287.
