= Rittmannshagener See =

Lake in Mecklenburg-Vorpommern, Germany

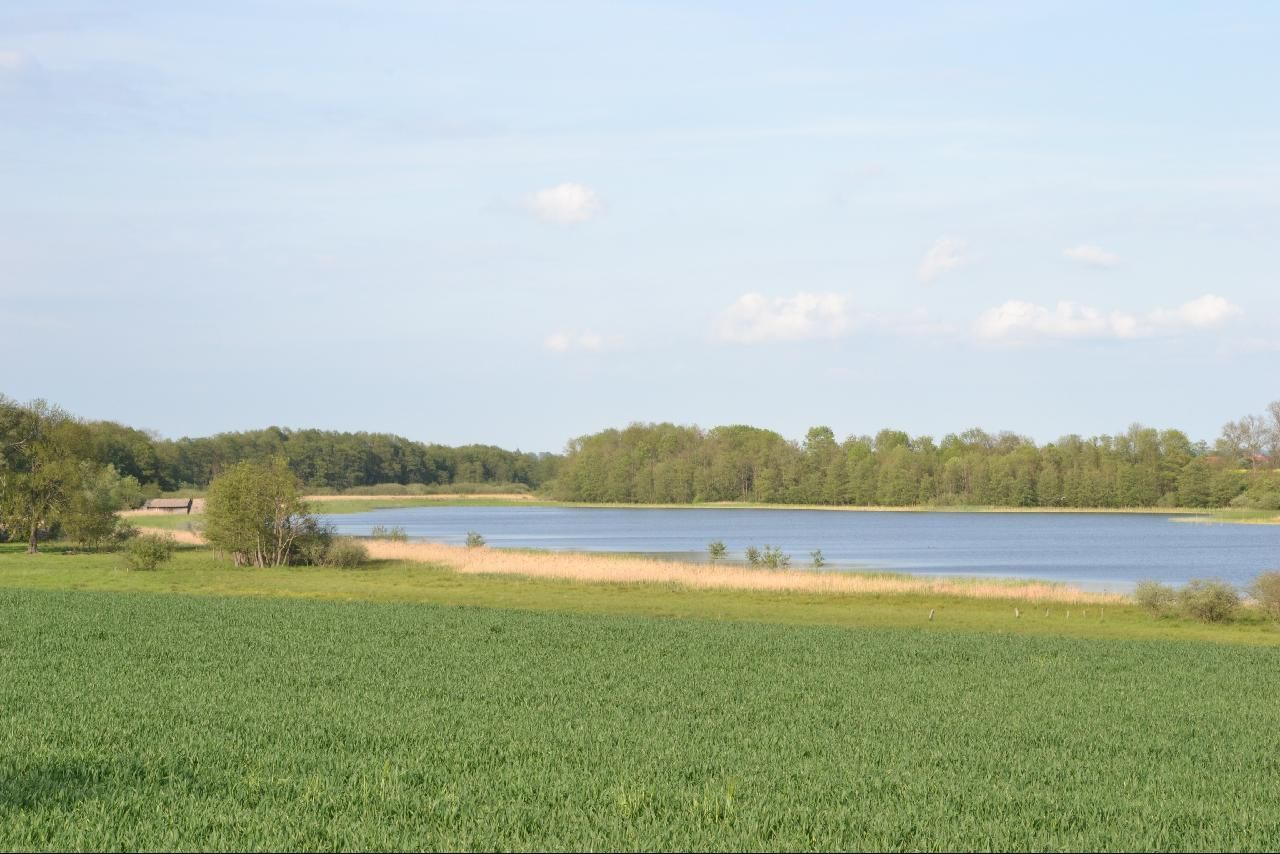

- Location within Mecklenburg-Vorpommern
- Location: Mecklenburgische Seenplatte, Mecklenburgische Seenplatte, Mecklenburg-Vorpommern
- Coordinates: 53°36′52.22″N 12°45′35.76″E
- Primary inflows: Ostpeene
- Primary outflows: Ostpeene
- Basin countries: Germany
- Surface area: 0.482 km^{2} (0.186 sq mi)
- Surface elevation: 31.9 m (105 ft)

Rittmannshagener See is a lake in the Mecklenburgische Seenplatte district in Mecklenburgische Seenplatte, Mecklenburg-Vorpommern, Germany. At an elevation of 31.9 m (105 ft), its surface area is 0.482 km^{2} (0.186 sq mi).
