= Peetschsee =

Lake in Germany

- Location within Mecklenburg-Vorpommern
- Location: Mecklenburgische Seenplatte, Mecklenburgische Seenplatte, Mecklenburg-Vorpommern
- Coordinates: 53°15′08″N 12°56′45″E
- Basin countries: Germany
- Surface area: 0.33 km^{2} (0.13 sq mi)
- Surface elevation: 59.1 m (194 ft)

Peetschsee is a lake in the Mecklenburg Lakeland (Mecklenburgische Seenplatte), Mecklenburgische Seenplatte district, Mecklenburg-Vorpommern, Germany. At an elevation of 59.1 m, its surface area is 0.33 km².
