= Domjüchsee =

Lake in Neustrelitz, Mecklenburg-Vorpommern, Germany

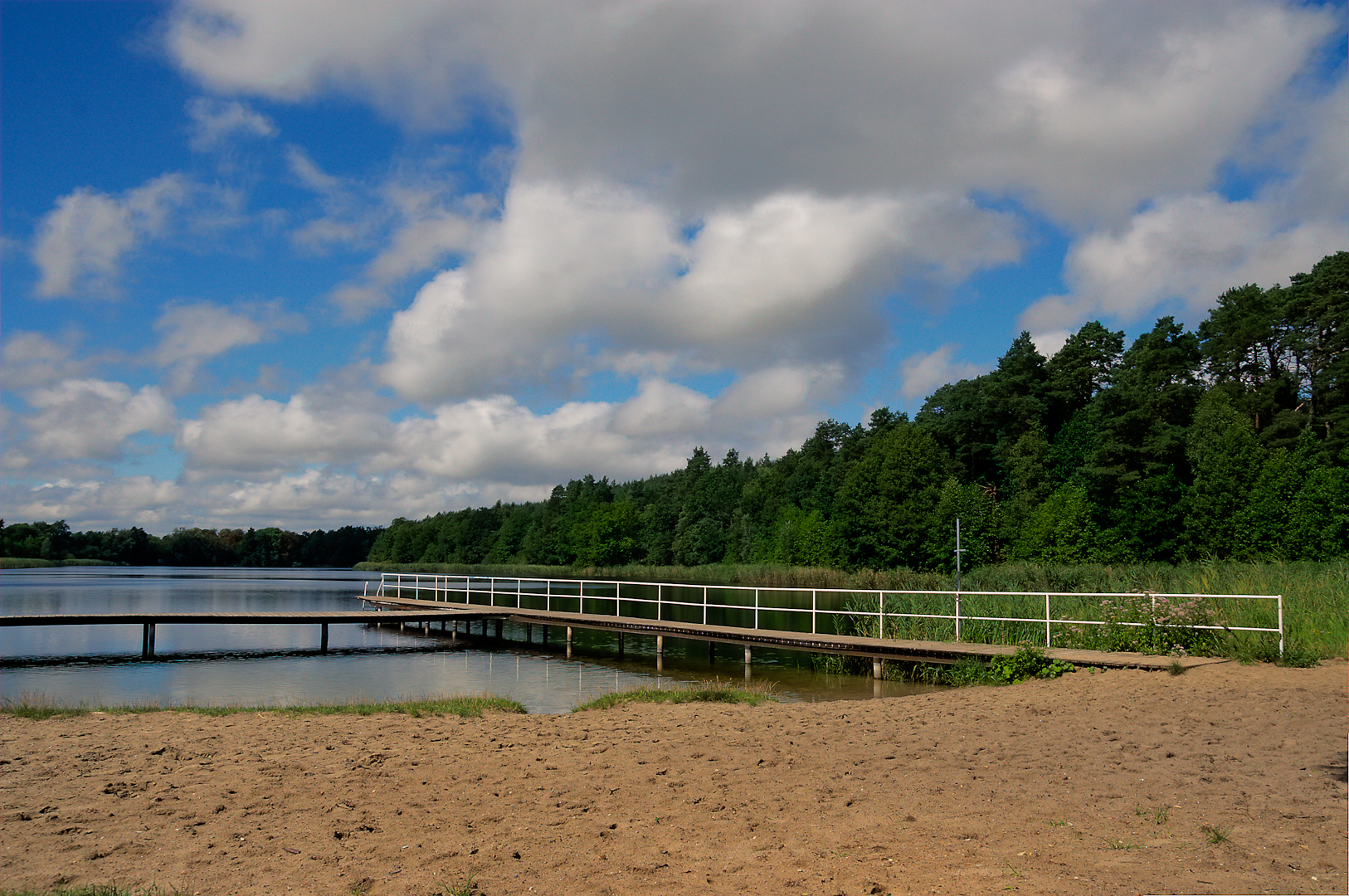

- Location within Mecklenburg-Vorpommern Location within Germany
- Location: Mecklenburgische Seenplatte, Mecklenburg-Vorpommern, Germany
- Coordinates: 53.33114°N 13.13151°E
- Primary inflows: Stendlitz
- Primary outflows: Stendlitz
- Basin countries: Germany
- Surface area: 0.247 km^{2} (0.095 sq mi)
- Max. depth: 5 m (16 ft)
- Surface elevation: 64 m (210 ft)

Domjüchsee is a lake in the course of a stream named Stendlitz in the Mecklenburgische Seenplatte district in Mecklenburg-Vorpommern, Germany. Its elevation is 64 m (210 ft) and its surface area is 0.247 km^{2} (0.095 sq mi). It is an ice-age channel lake located in the Neustrelitz area of the Mecklenburg Lake District. A popular hiking and cycling trail surrounds the lake, passing by the ruins of a historic, abandoned state psychiatric hospital known as Landesirrenanstalt Domjüch. Today, the lake's surrounding area is frequently used for outdoor recreation, and the historic hospital grounds occasionally host cultural events and urban art festivals.
