= Mecklenburg Lake Plateau =

Lake in Mecklenburg-Vorpommern

Coordinates: 53°16′30″N 12°39′47″E

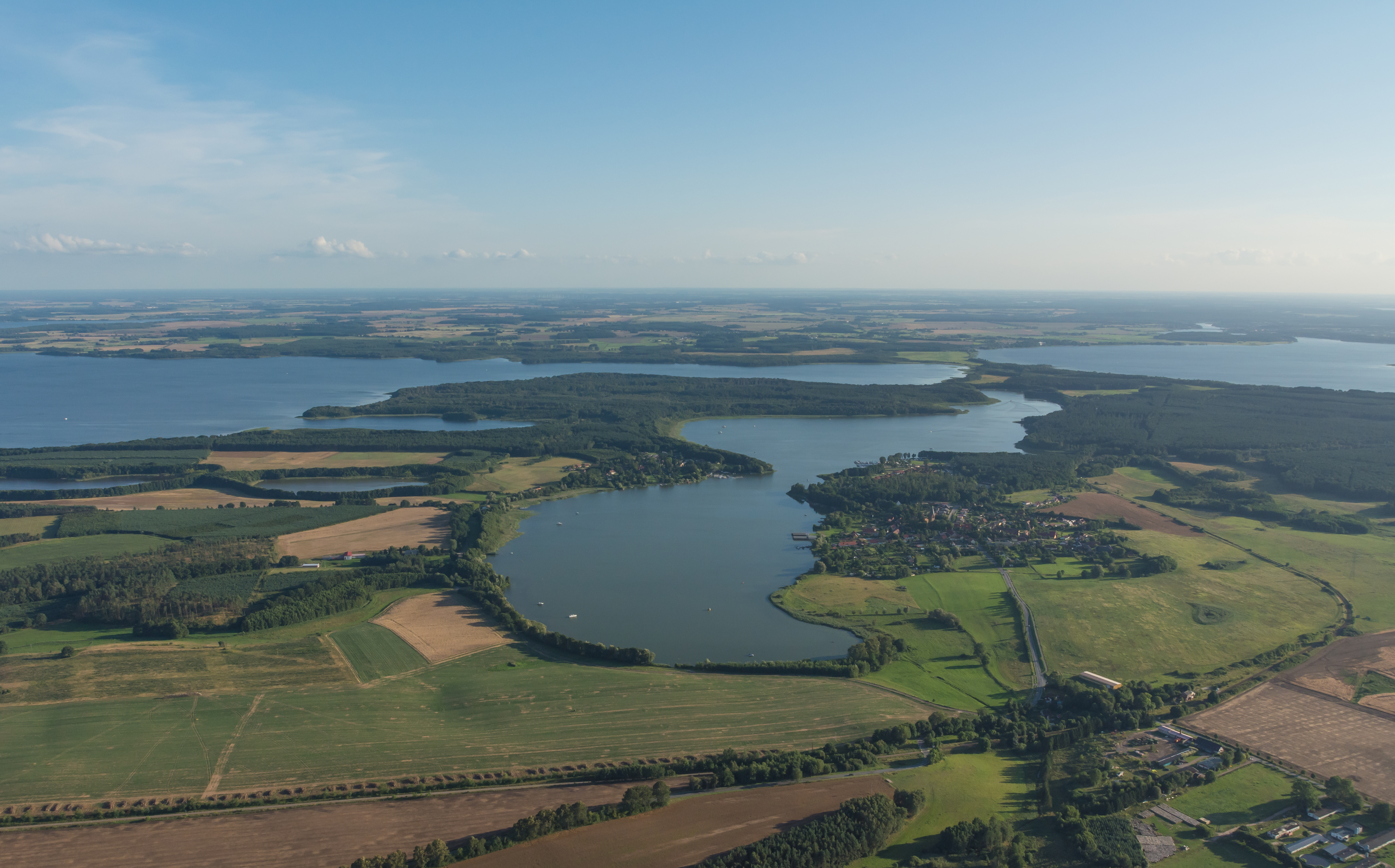
- The Kölpinsee, Jabelscher See and Fleesensee near Jabel The Kölpinsee, Jabelscher See and Fleesensee near Jabel
- Native name: Mecklenburgische Seenplatte
- Area: 6,014.4 km²
- Classification: Handbook of Natural Region Divisions of Germany
- Level 1 natural region: North German Plain
- Level 2 natural region: 70, 72–75 → Northeast German Lake Districts
- Level 3 natural region: 75 → Mecklenburg Lake Plateau
- State(s): Mecklenburg-Vorpommern, Brandenburg, Schleswig-Holstein

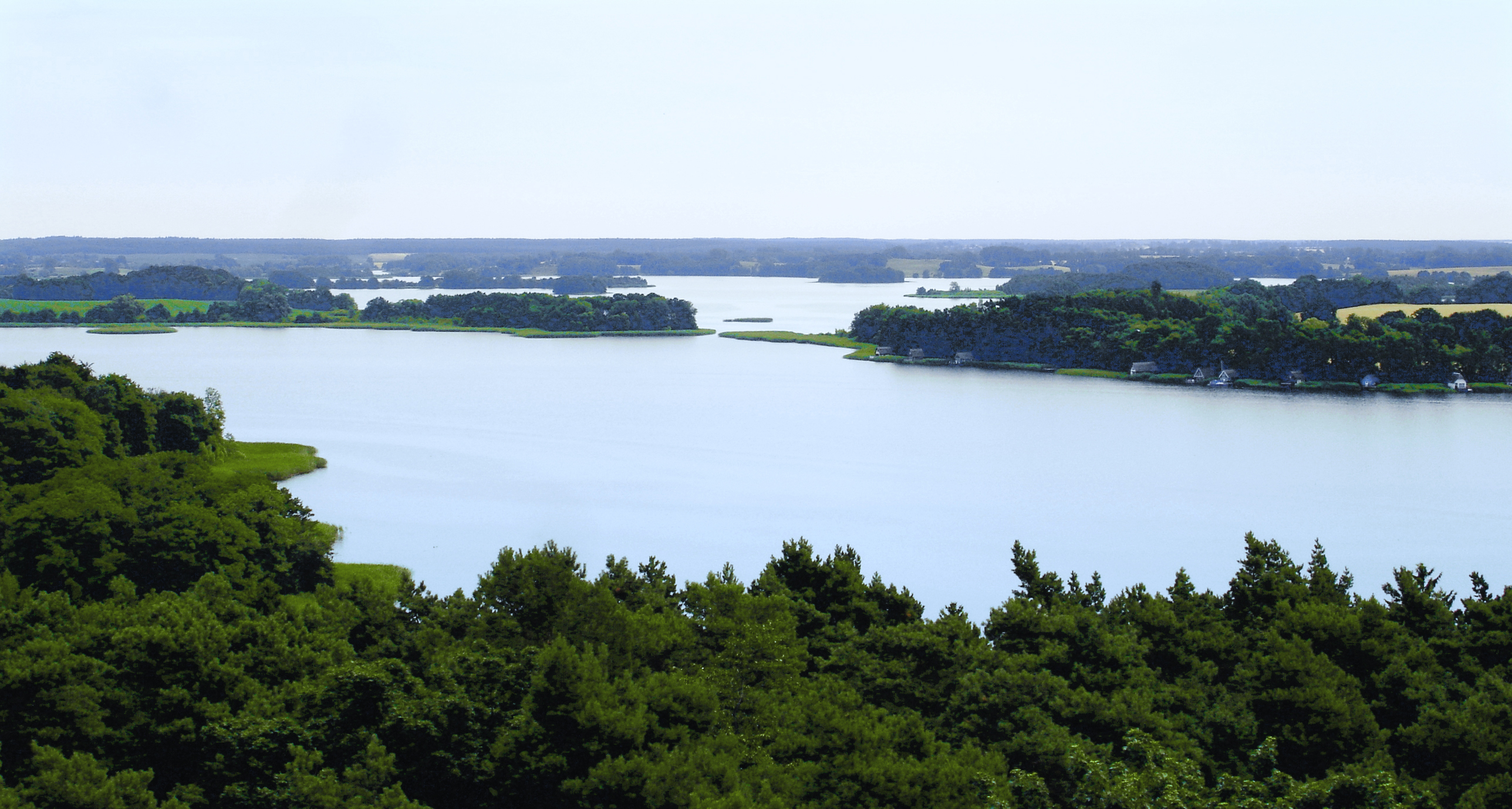
Lake Krakow (Krakower See)

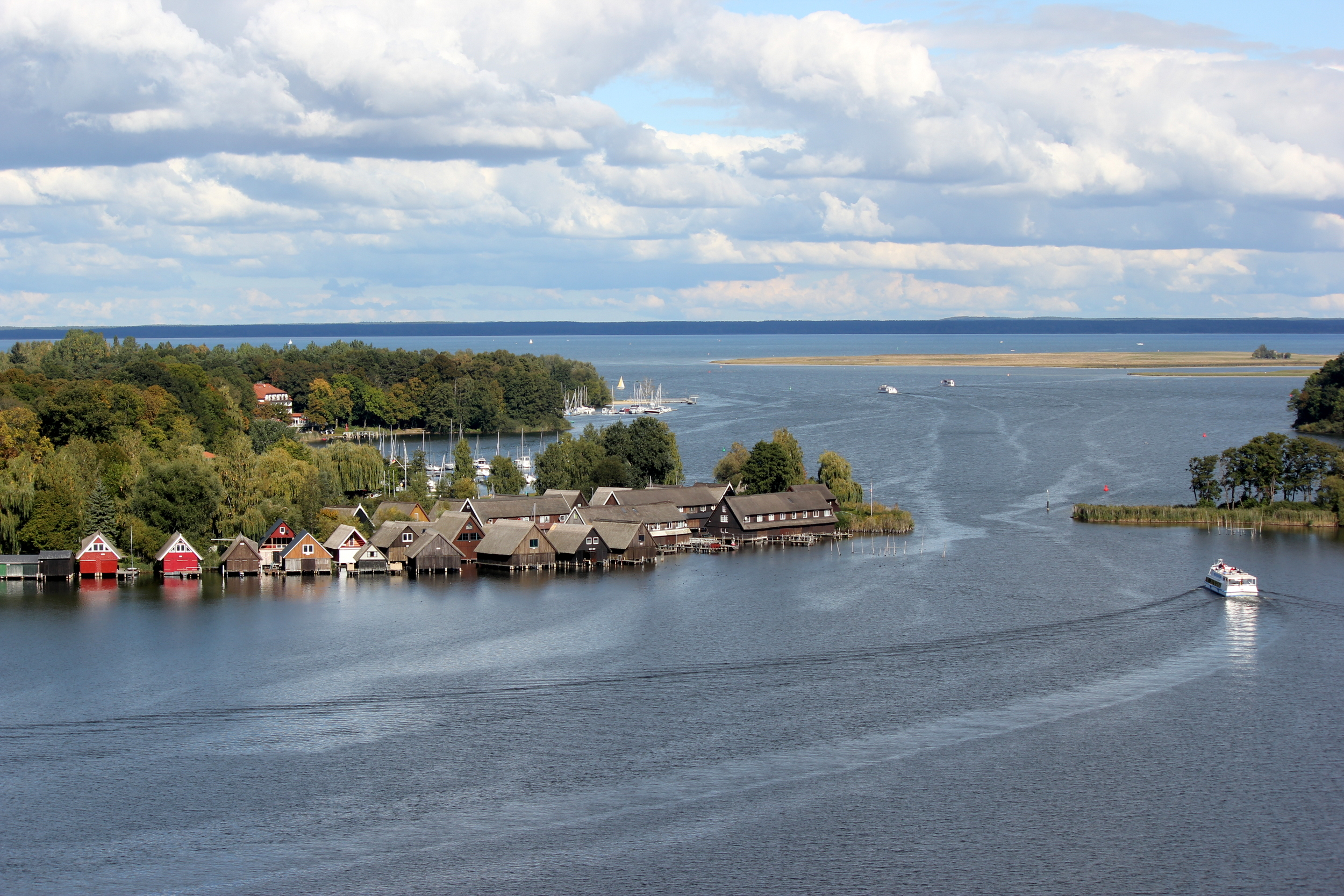
Lake Müritz in the heart of the Mecklenburg Lakeland. View from the church of St. Mary towards the lake harbour of Röbel.

The Mecklenburg Lake Plateau or Mecklenburg Lakeland (German: Mecklenburger / Mecklenburgische Seenplatte or Seenland) is the largest coherent lake and canal region in Germany and is sometimes called "the land of a thousand lakes". There are several nature parks and well-known lakes with unique flora and fauna in the region, such as the Müritz, the biggest German lake lying entirely within Germany, the Plauer See, the Fleesensee, the Tollensesee, the Schmaler Luzin and the Kölpinsee.

Important towns of the region are Neubrandenburg, Neustrelitz, Waren, Röbel, Teterow, Malchow, Mirow and Plau am See.

== Geography ==
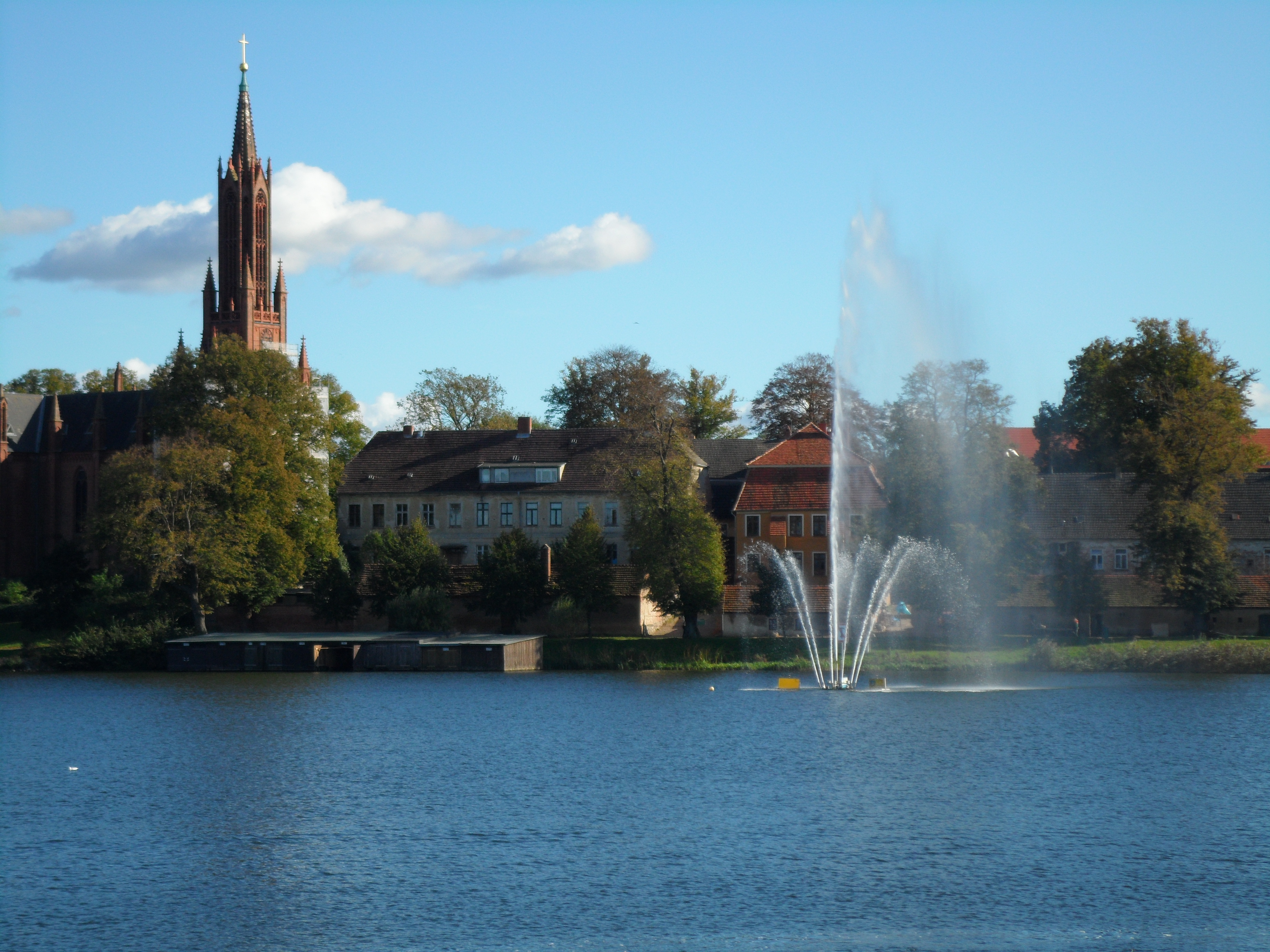
Malchow Abbey at the lake in Malchow

The Mecklenburg Lake District is situated in the central and southern part of the state of Mecklenburg-Western Pomerania, mostly in historical region of Mecklenburg. In the south it crosses the border of the state Brandenburg. Hence it is also known as the Mecklenburg-Brandenburg Lake District.

Like the Pomeranian and Masurian lake plateaux, the Mecklenburg Lake District was formed about 12,000 years ago from the glacial meltwater valleys (urstromtäler) and sandar of the last ice age. The main terminal moraine of the Pomeranian stage of the Weichselian, the ridge that runs from Eberswalde-Chorin through Feldberg, Mecklenburg Switzerland to the Kühlung ridge near Kühlungsborn, borders the lakeland to the north.

The lakeland can be roughly divided as follows:

Lake region	Towns	Rivers
Feldberg Lake District Nature Park	Feldberg Lake District	Havel
Mecklenburg Great Lakes Region with Müritz, Plauer See, Kölpinsee	Waren (Müritz), Röbel/Müritz, Plau am See	Elde
Neustrelitz Little Lakes Region	Neustrelitz, Mirow, Wesenberg, Fürstenberg/Havel, Lychen	Havel
Rheinsberg Lake Region	Rheinsberg	Rhin
Tollensesee and Mecklenburg Switzerland	Neubrandenburg, Burg Stargard, Malchin, Neukalen, Penzlin, Stavenhagen, Teterow	Peene

On Brandenburg territory the lakeland continues into the Uckermark and Rheinsberg Lake Region.

The area in and around the Mecklenburg Lake District is partly hilly but mostly flat, sparsely populated and mainly covered by forests, lakes and marshes. The lakes themselves are popular for recreation, boating, fishing and several water sport activities. They are a natural habitat for numerous plants and animals, including endangered species.

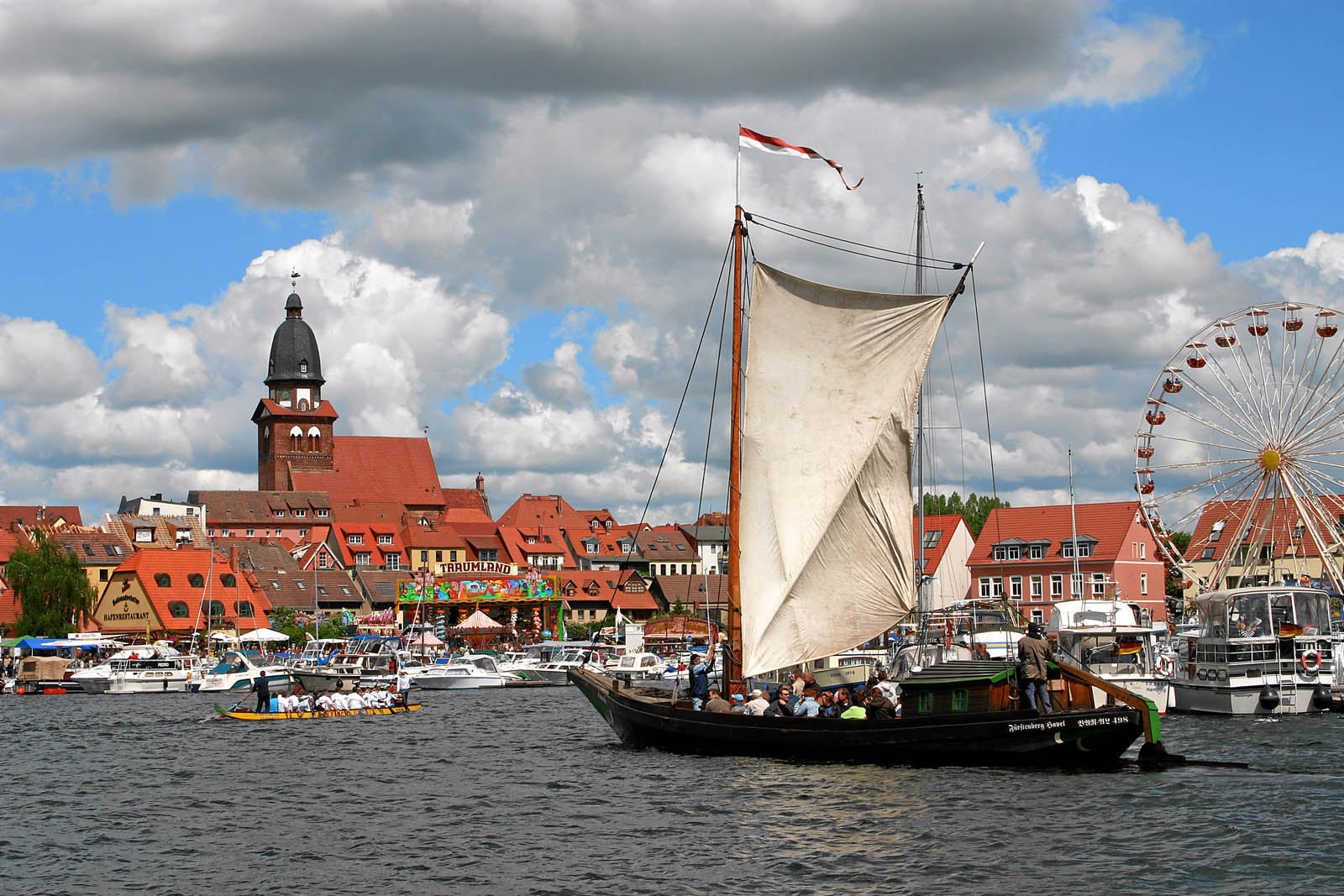
The harbour of the spa town of Waren on Lake Müritz during the Müritz Sail, one of the biggest European lake sailing events

== History ==
The lakeland was already settled around 10,000 BC by huntsmen and fishermen. From 4,000 BC the first farming communities were established, leaving behind megalithic tombs.

In the 4th and 5th centuries, the Germanic settlers of the region migrated south and were replaced from the 7th century by West Slavs (historically known as Wends), who intermingled with the population that had stayed behind.

From the 12th century, the influence of German settlers increased.

For a few years the area was a member of the European Geoparks Network and the Global Network of National Geoparks but as of 2011 it no longer possesses that status.

== Natural regions ==
The designated natural regions in the Mecklenburg Lake District are the Müritz National Park, with Germany's second-largest lake, as well as the wildlife reserves of Feldberg Lake District Nature Park, Mecklenburg Switzerland and Lake Kummerow Nature Park and the Nossentiner/Schwinzer Heath Nature Park.

== See also ==
- Category:Lakes of Mecklenburg-Vorpommern
