= Friedrich Bohndorff =

German researcher and ornithologist

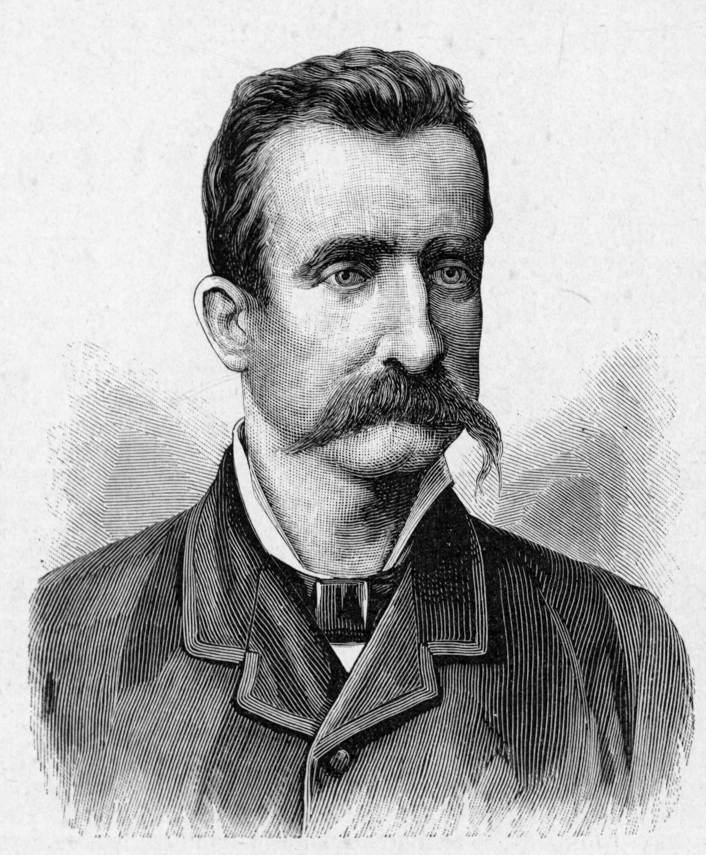
Friedrich Bohndorff (1887)

Friedrich Bohndorff (August 16, 1848, Plau am See, Mecklenburg-Schwerin - after 1894) was a German researcher and ornithologist.

Initially apprenticed as a goldsmith, Bohndorff embarked on a journey in 1871 to Egypt, where he spent a few years learning Arabic in Cairo. In 1880 he participated on an expedition to the African interior under the leadership of Wilhelm Junker (1840–1892). The expedition was a continuation of scientific exploration and research began by Georg August Schweinfurth (1836–1925) several years earlier. Here, the group entered regions inhabited by the Mangbetu and Azande peoples. In 1882, his northward return on the Nile was delayed by the Mahdi uprising, forcing him to spend more than a year in the Bahr al-Ghazal region in southern Sudan.

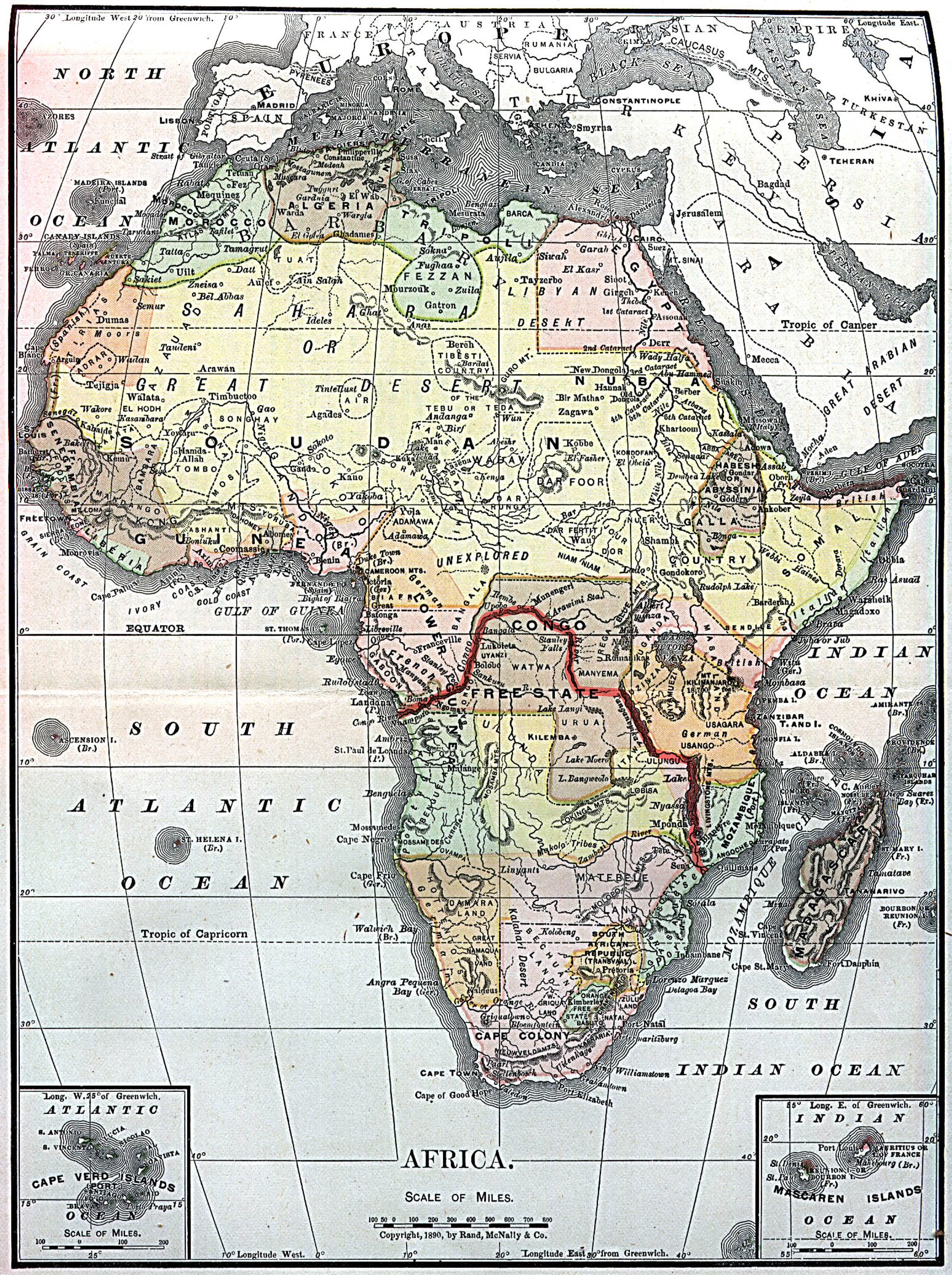
Route of Österreichische-Congo-Expedition (1885-87)

In 1885–87, with geologist Oskar Lenz, he successfully traversed the African continent from west to east, afterwards spending six months with Lenz in Vienna and Brussels. In 1889 Bohndorff served as a dragoman of the Schutztruppe under Hermann von Wissmann (1853–1905) in German East Africa, and from 1892 lived and worked in Berlin.

In Africa, he discovered and described a number of insect species, as well as ornithological species and subspecies. He has a handful of avian subspecies named after him, including Anthus leucophrys bohndorffi (Congo plain-backed pipit) and Ploceus cucullatus bohndorffi (a village weaver subspecies).
