= Stendlitz =

River in Germany

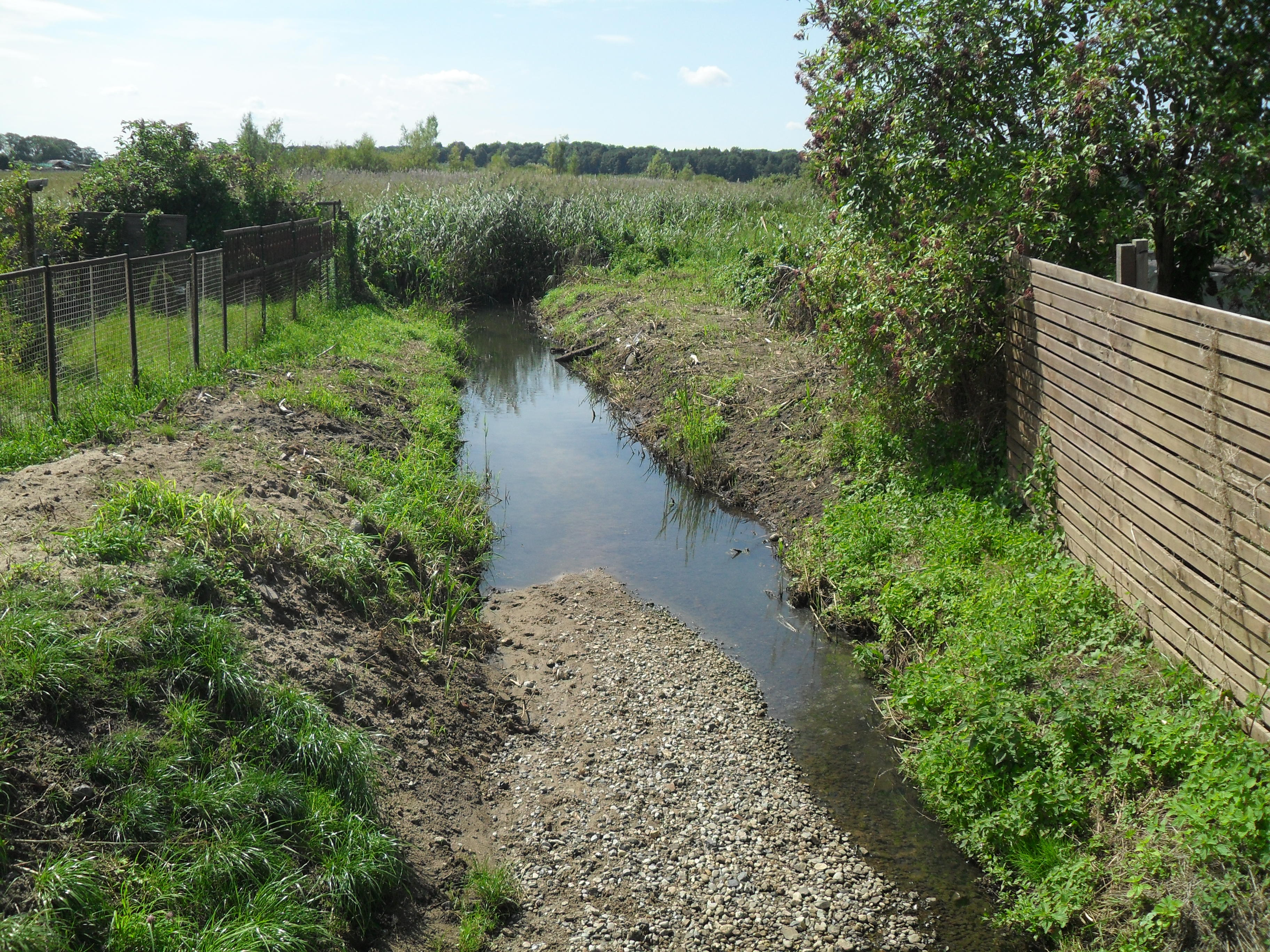

Location
- Country: Germany
- State: Mecklenburg-Vorpommern

Physical characteristics
- Source
  - location: Moosbruch wetland 4 km NE of Domjüchsee
  - elevation: 70 m
- Mouth
  - location: Tiefer Trebbower See
  - coordinates: 53.3116°N 13.0799°E
  - elevation: 57.8 m
- Length: 9.998 km
- Basin size: 27.7 km²

Basin features
- Progression: Floßgraben→ Havel→ Elbe→ North Sea
- River system: Elbe

Stendlitz is a river in Mecklenburg-Vorpommern, Germany. Four kilometers from its source in Moosbruch wetland, it passes Domjüchsee. From there, it passes through Strelitz-Alt, before discharging into the Tiefer Trebbower See near Klein Trebbow.

== See also ==
- List of rivers of Mecklenburg-Vorpommern
