= Alfred Brunswig =

German philosopher

Alfred Brunswig (born 13 June 1877 in Plau am See; died 22 June 1927 in Münster) was a German philosopher. He taught at Westphalian Wilhelms-University in Münster (Westphalia).

== Life ==
After graduating from high school in Munich in 1896, Brunswig studied at the Universities of Munich and Berlin until he received his doctorate with Theodor Lipps in 1904. During this period, he adopted Lipps' psychologism. After studying with Edmund Husserl in Göttingen and Carl Stumpf in Berlin, he habilitated in Munich in 1910. He criticized Husserl's conception of evidence and intuition of essences.

Brunswig served in World War I and was awarded the Iron Cross, Second Class. He joined the University of Münster during the winter semester of 1916/17. Through his experiences at the front, where he was "constantly looking death in the eye", he found the "courage for metaphysics" and emphasized Christian faith and German nationalism. His interpretation of Leibniz in 1925 highlighted his role as a "Germanic thinker".

== Works ==
- Das Vergleichen und die Relationserkenntnis. Leipzig/Berlin: B. G. Teubner, 1910.
- Das Grundproblem Kants. Eine kritische Untersuchung und Einführung in die Philosophie Kants. Leipzig/Berlin: B. G. Teubner, 1914.
- Einführung in die Psychologie. München: Rösl & Cie, 1921.
- Hegel. München: Rösl 1922.
- Leibniz. Deutschlands universellster Geist. Leipzig: Verlag Karl König, 1925.
- Das Gedächtnis und seine Erziehung. Berlin/Leipzig: Gebrüder Paetel, 1926.
