= Friedrich Lange (artist) =

German history painter

Friedrich Lange (29 October 1834, Plau am See – 18 July 1875, Strasbourg) was a German history painter and member of the Nazarene movement.

== Life ==
Friedrich Lange, son of a court clerk, spent the first years of his life in Plau, then in Bützow, where his father had been transferred. He had six siblings, including a younger brother who studied music in Dresden. He completed his painting apprenticeship with Gaston Lenthe (1805–1860) in Schwerin. He then went to the art academy in Dresden, where he studied diligently for five years as a student at the academy. There he was also four years special student with Julius Schnorr von Carolsfeld.

In 1859, Lange received a gold medal for The Entombment of Christ at the Dresden Art Exhibition. From 1859 to 1862, he lived in Rome on a grant from Grand Duke Friedrich Franz II, where he was a member of the Lukasbund and the German Artists' Association. Lange lived in Schwerin from April to October 1862, where two small commissioned works were created. He then moved on to Bavaria, Austria, and Northern Italy. One of his daughters was the painter and artisan Laura Lange, who ran a studio together with Martha von Kranz in Munich.
