= Penkow =

- Ortsteil of Göhren-Lebbin
- Interactive map of Penkow
- Location within Germany Location within Mecklenburg-Vorpommern
- Coordinates: 53°27′24″N 12°29′12″E
- Country: Germany
- State: Mecklenburg-Vorpommern
- District: Mecklenburgische Seenplatte
- Municipality: Göhren-Lebbin

Area
  - Total: 9.35 km^{2} (3.61 sq mi)
- Elevation: 84 m (276 ft)

Population (2022-12-31)
  - Total: 312
  - Density: 33.4/km^{2} (86.4/sq mi)
- Time zone: UTC+01:00 (CET)
  - Summer (DST): UTC+02:00 (CEST)
- Postal codes: 17213
- Dialling codes: 039932
- Vehicle registration: MÜR
- Website: www.inselstadt-malchow.de

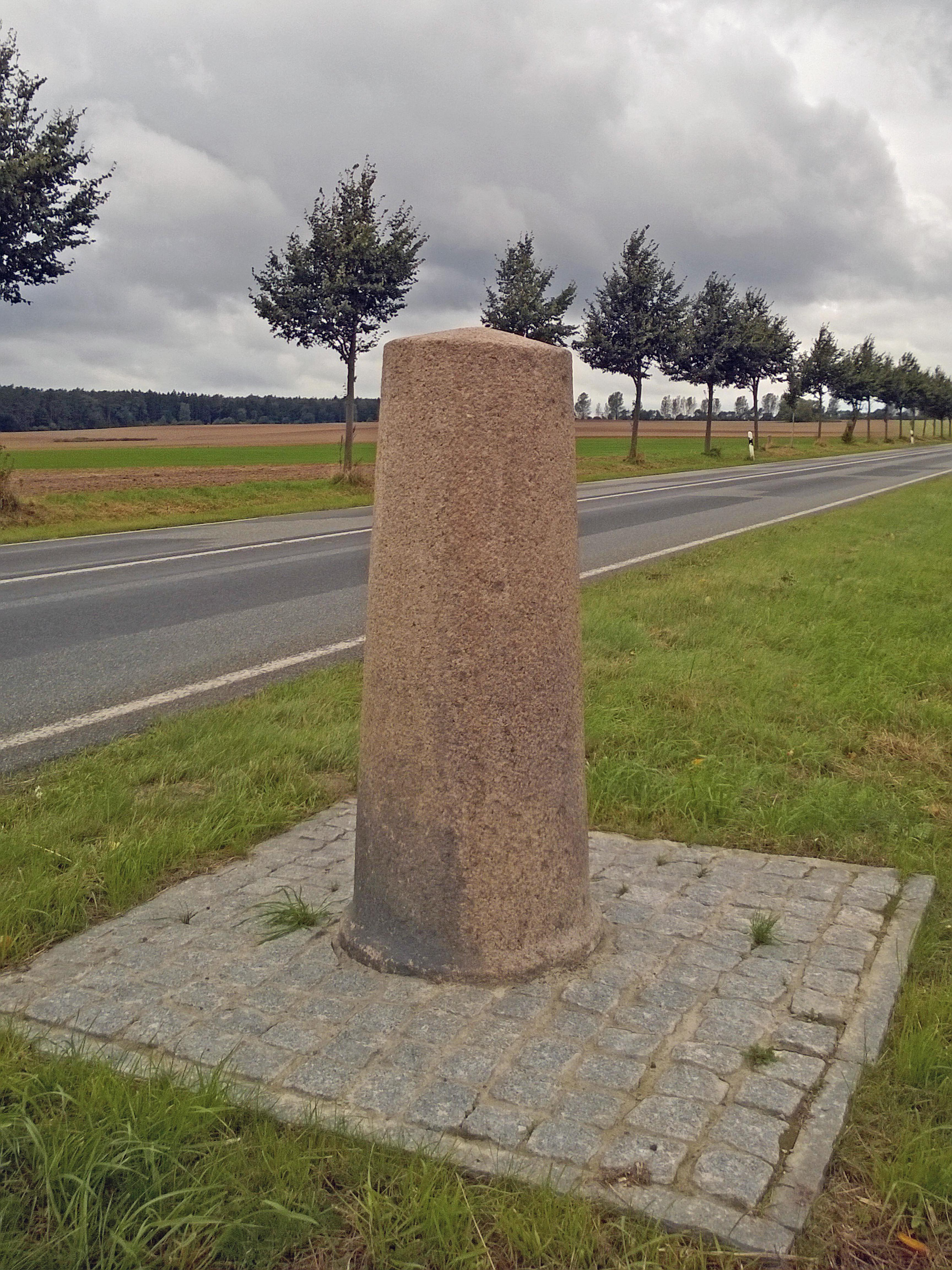
Mecklenburg milestone on the B 192 road in Penkow

Penkow (German pronunciation: [ˈpɛnkoː]) is a village and a former municipality in the Mecklenburgische Seenplatte district, in Mecklenburg-Vorpommern, Germany. Since 1 January 2024, it is part of the municipality Göhren-Lebbin.
