= Plau Castle =

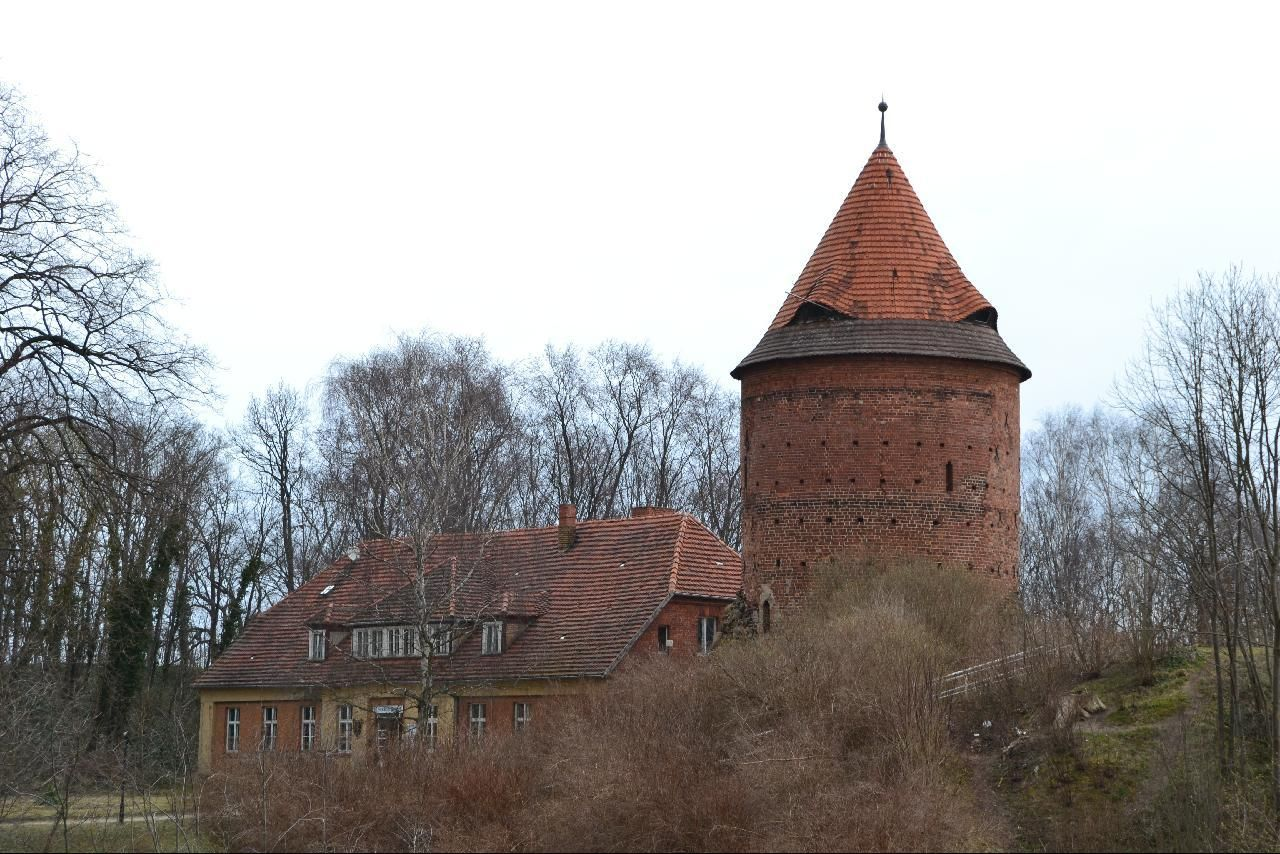
Plau Castle

Plau Castle is a lowland castle on the west side of Plauer See, Mecklenburg in Germany. Plau Castle was built in 1287. The foundation of a castle-like "princely house" on the northeastern edge of the old town of Plau goes back to the 1283 ruling Nicholas II of Werle. Plau Castle is divided into two parts, the castle tower and the museum, Run by honorary members of the Plauer Heimatverein, it attracts more visitors year after year.
