= Oskar Lenz =

Geologist and mineralogist (1948–1925)

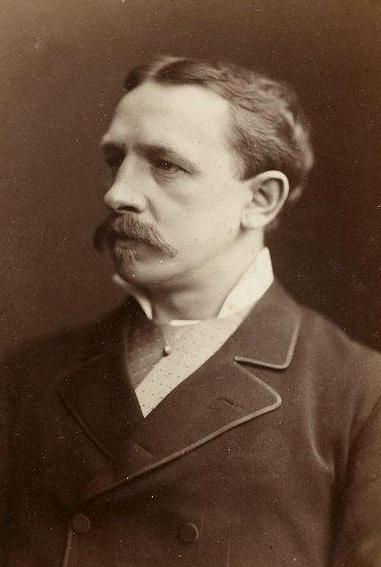
portrait of Oskar Lenz

Oskar Lenz (13 April 1848 in Leipzig – 1 March 1925 in Sooß) was a German-Austrian geologist and mineralogist born in Leipzig.

== Life ==
In 1870, he earned his doctorate in mineralogy and geology at the University of Leipzig. In 1872, he joined as a volunteer at the Imperial Geological Reichsanstalt in Vienna. Later that same year he obtained Austrian citizenship.

Between 1874 and 1877 he travelled the coast of West Africa.

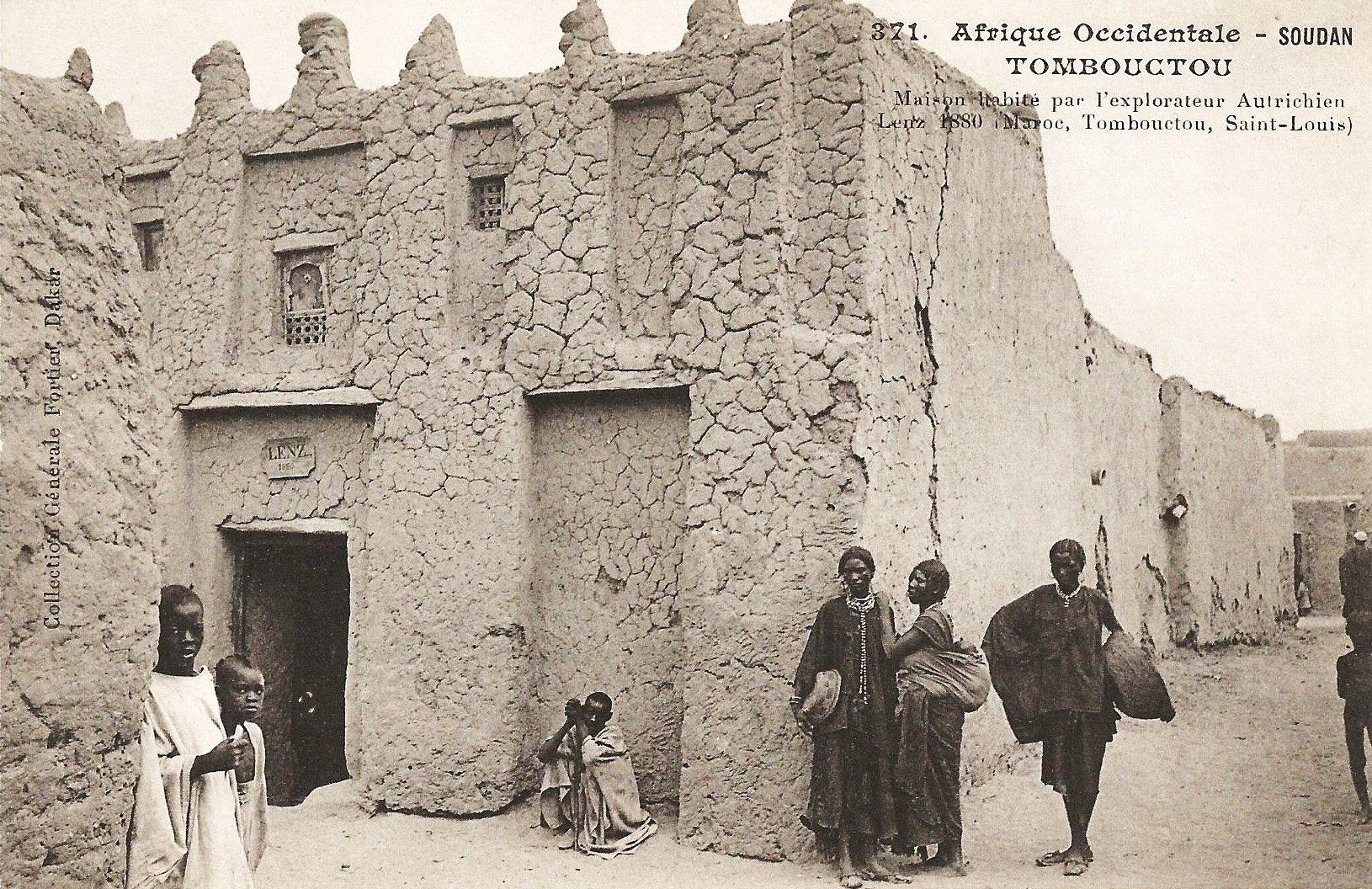
House inhabited by Oskar Lenz in Timbuktu (1880)

In 1879–1880, he led the first trans-Sahara expedition from Morocco to Senegal. The primary purpose of the expedition was to perform geological studies of the region, investigating the possibilities of iron ore deposits. In 1880, with his Spaniard companion Cristobal Benítez, he became only the fourth European to visit the fabled city of Timbuktu. The others being, Alexander Gordon Laing (1826), René Caillié (1828) and Heinrich Barth (1853).

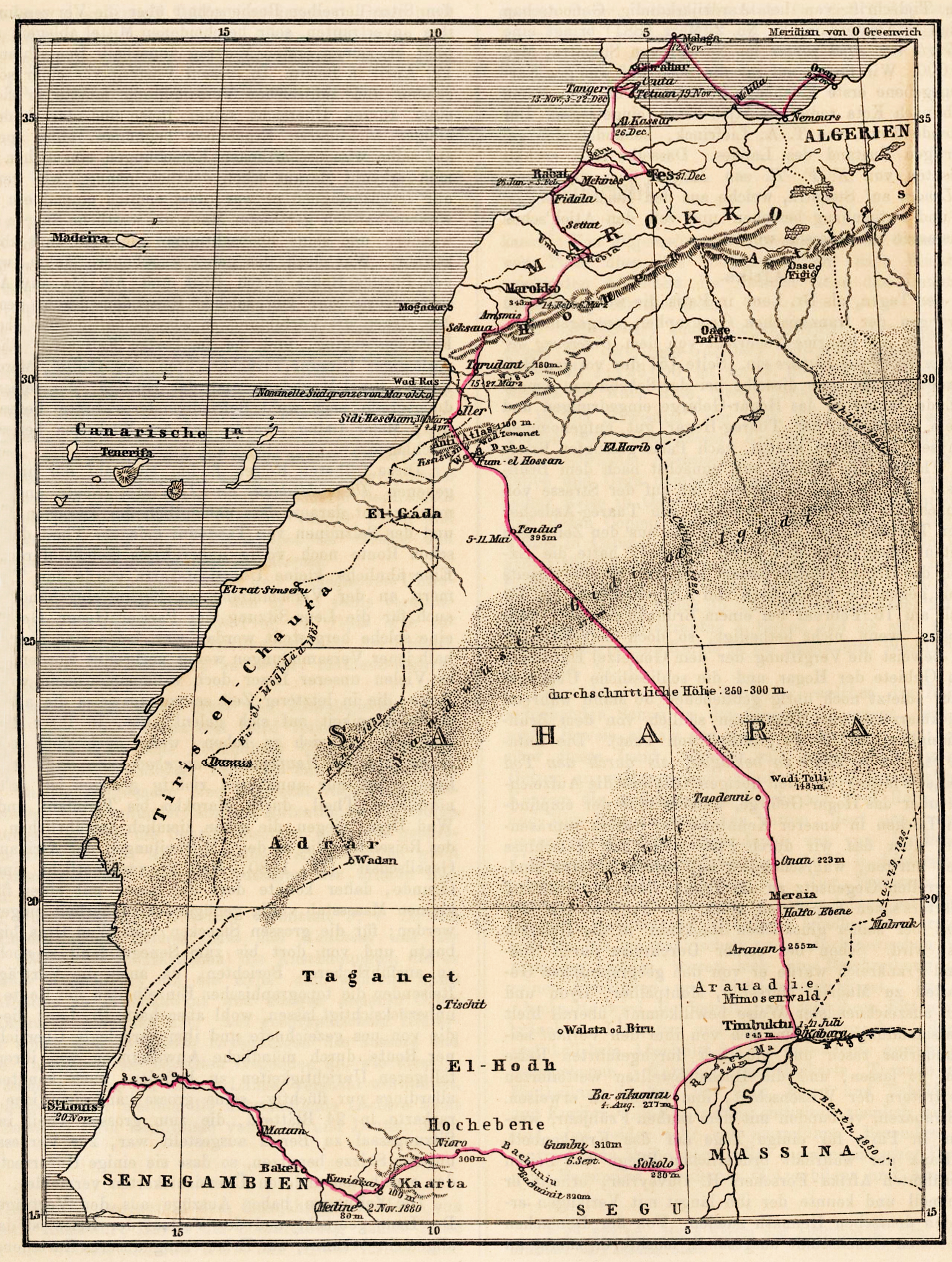
Map depicting Lenz' expedition to Timbuktu

In 1885–1887, he directed the Austro-Hungarian Congo Expedition, a mission that involved crossing the African continent from the Congo eastward to the Indian Ocean. The main reasons of the project were to survey the economic trade situation in the newly established Congo Free State and to map the Congo-Nile watershed between the Nile and Congo Rivers. On the expedition, he was accompanied by cartographer Oskar Baumann (up until succumbing to illness on the mission) and ornithologist Friedrich Bohndorff. Following the completion of his duties in Africa, he became a professor at the University of Prague (June 1887).

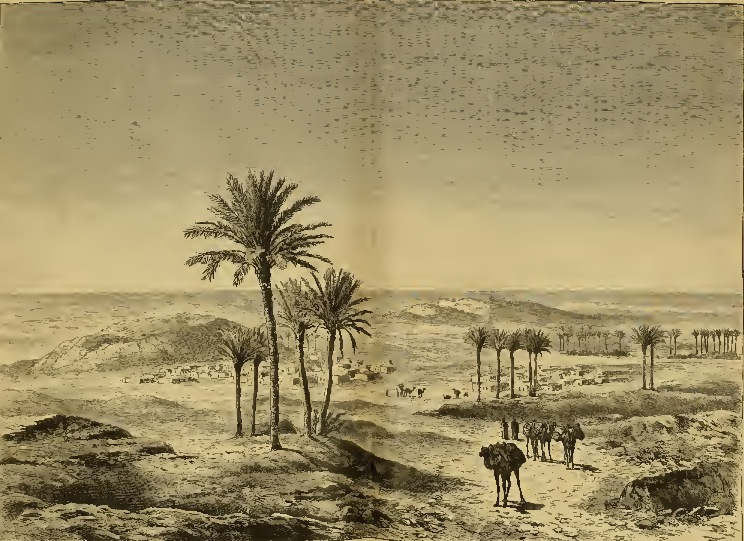
Illustration of Tindouf Oasis (1880), from "Timbouctou : voyage au Maroc, au Sahara et au Soudan".

== Selected publications ==
- Ueber das Auftreten Jurassischer Gebilde in Böhmen, (On the occurrence of Jurassic build-up in Bohemia), (1870).
- Skizzen aus Westafrika (Sketches of West Africa), (1878).
- Lenz, Oskar (1884). Timbuktu: Reise durch Marokko, die Sahara und den Sudan, ausgeführt im Auftrage der Afrikanischen Gesellschaft in Deutschland in den Jahren 1879 und 1880 (2 Volumes) (in German). Leipzig: Brockhaus. Volume 1, Volume 2. Translated into French in 1886 by Pierre Lehautcourt.
- Lenz, Oskar (1886–87). Timbouctou : voyage au Maroc, au Sahara et au Soudan (in French). Lehautcourt, Pierre (trans.). Paris: Hachette. Gallica: Volume 1, Volume 2.
- Geologische Karte von West-Afrika, (Geological chart of West Africa), (1882).
- Wanderungen in Afrika (Travels in Africa), (1895).
- Ophir und die ruinen von Zimbabye in Südostafrika, Prag, Verlag Des Vereins (Ophir and the ruins of Zimbabwe in southeastern Africa), (1896).
