= Göhren-Lebbin =

- Municipality
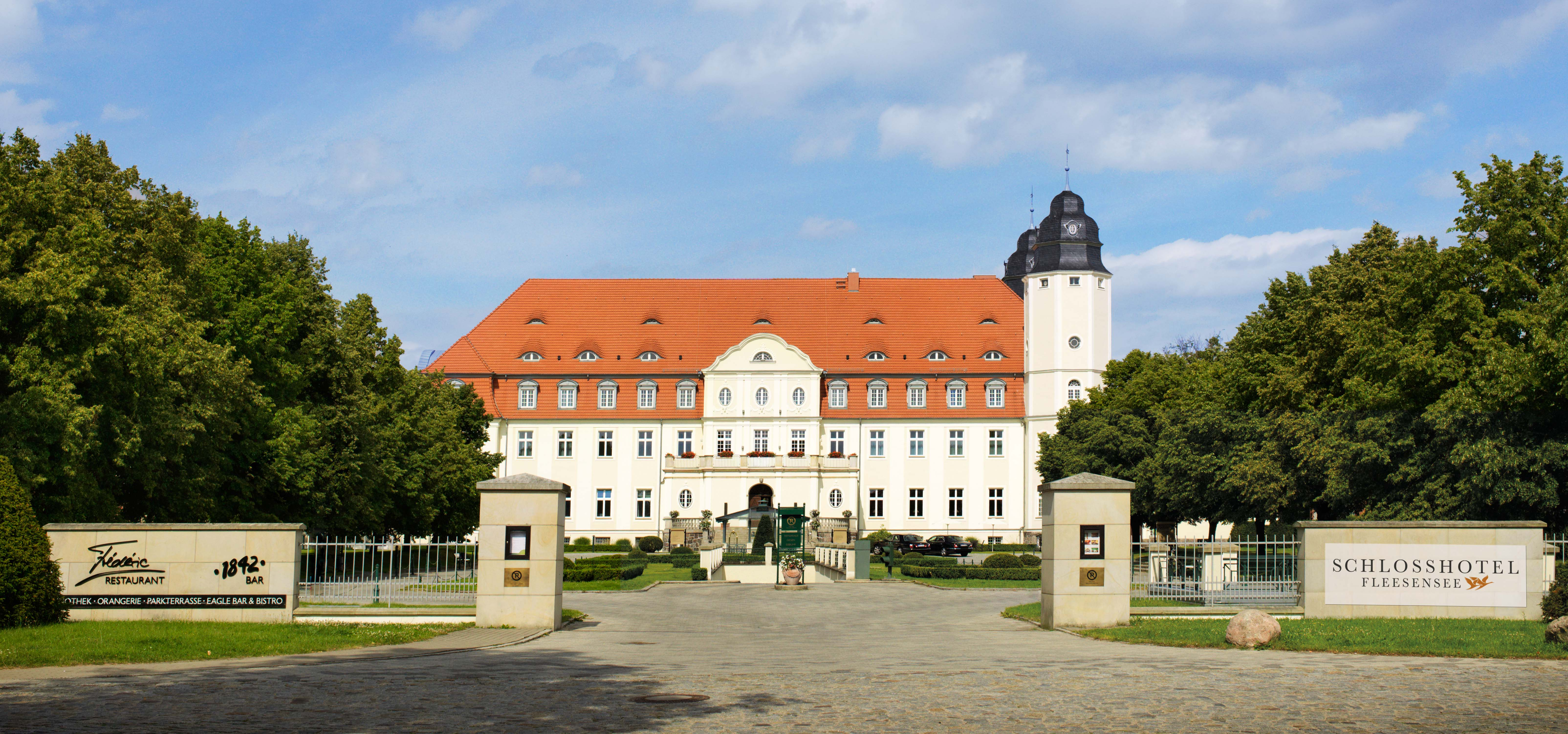
- Schloss Fleesensee in Göhren-Lebbin

- Coat of arms

- Location of Göhren-Lebbin within Mecklenburgische Seenplatte district
- Interactive map of Göhren-Lebbin
- Location within Germany Location within Mecklenburg-Vorpommern
- Coordinates: 53°28′43″N 12°30′38″E
- Country: Germany
- State: Mecklenburg-Vorpommern
- District: Mecklenburgische Seenplatte
- Municipal assoc.: Malchow
- Subdivisions: 6

Government
  - Mayor: Torsten Zillmer

Area
  - Total: 41.59 km^{2} (16.06 sq mi)
- Elevation: 74 m (243 ft)

Population (2025-12-31)
  - Total: 959
  - Density: 23.1/km^{2} (59.7/sq mi)
- Time zone: UTC+01:00 (CET)
  - Summer (DST): UTC+02:00 (CEST)
- Postal codes: 17213
- Dialling codes: 039932
- Vehicle registration: MÜR

Göhren-Lebbin (German pronunciation: [ˈɡøːʁən lɛˈbiːn]) is a municipality in the Mecklenburgische Seenplatte district, in Mecklenburg-Vorpommern, in north-eastern Germany. The village part Untergöhren is located on the shore of the Fleesensee. On 1 January 2024, the former municipality Penkow was merged into Göhren-Lebbin.

== History ==
During the final stages of World War II, on 2 March 1945, Lebbin was the site of a stopover during the German-organised march of Polish prisoners of war from the Oflag II-D camp to the Stalag X-B camp.
