= Plau am See =

Town in Mecklenburg-Vorpommern, Germany

- Town
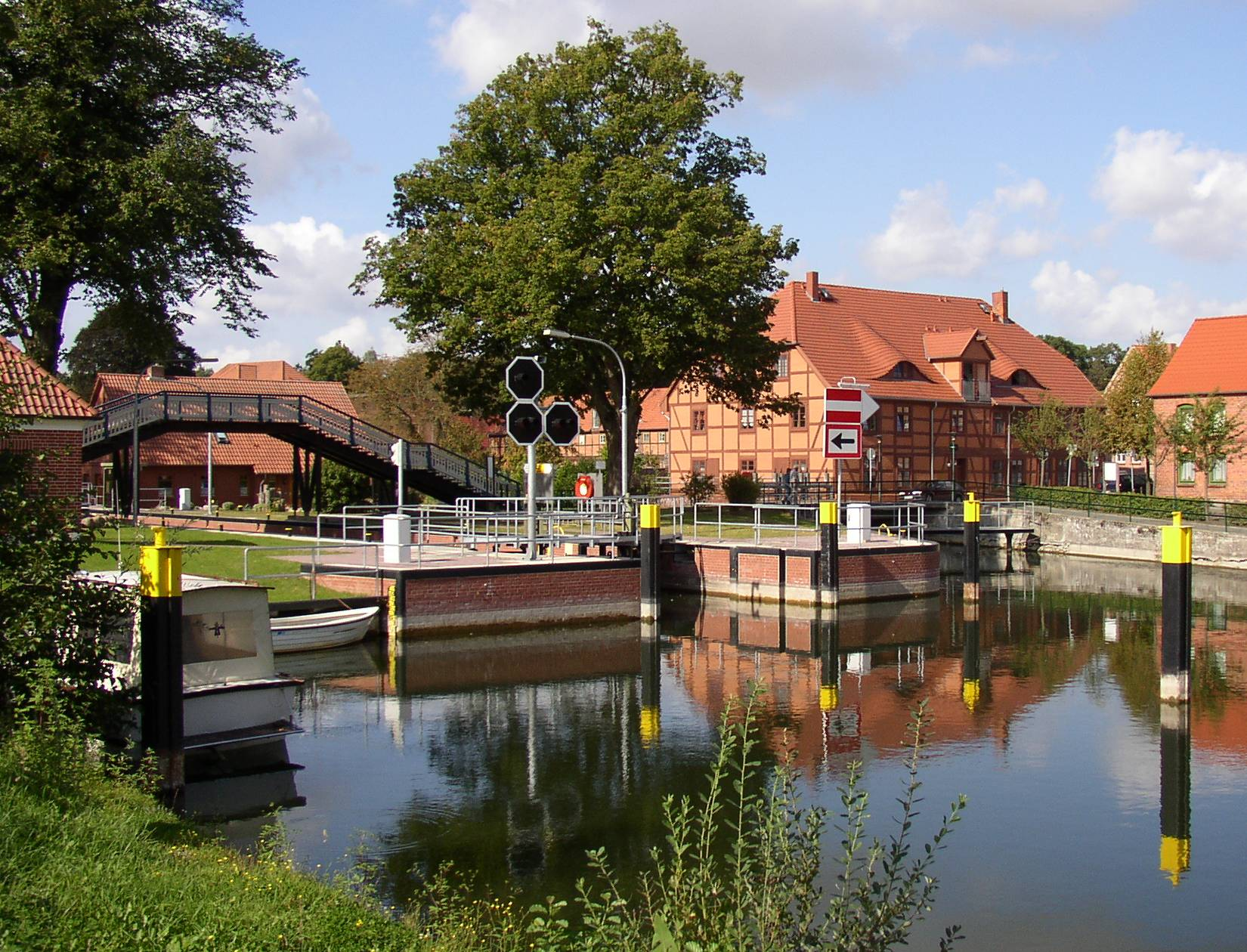
- Lock and former mill

- Coat of arms

- Location of Plau am See within Ludwigslust-Parchim district
- Interactive map of Plau am See
- Location within Germany Location within Mecklenburg-Vorpommern
- Coordinates: 53°27′29″N 12°15′45″E
- Country: Germany
- State: Mecklenburg-Vorpommern
- District: Ludwigslust-Parchim
- Municipal assoc.: Plau am See
- Subdivisions: 9

Government
  - Mayor: Norbert Reier (Left)

Area
  - Total: 116.27 km^{2} (44.89 sq mi)
- Elevation: 70 m (230 ft)

Population (2025-12-31)
  - Total: 5,958
  - Density: 51.24/km^{2} (132.7/sq mi)
- Time zone: UTC+01:00 (CET)
  - Summer (DST): UTC+02:00 (CEST)
- Postal codes: 19395
- Dialling codes: 038735
- Vehicle registration: PCH
- Website: www.stadt-plau-am-see.de

Plau am See (German pronunciation: [ˈplaʊ ʔam ˈzeː], lit. 'Plau on the Lake') is a town in the Ludwigslust-Parchim district, in Mecklenburg-Western Pomerania, in north-eastern Germany. It is situated 28 kilometres (17 mi) east of Parchim, and 29 kilometres (18 mi) west of Waren.

== Etymology ==
Around 1235 the town was called Plawe, that being the Polabian field name for the place where rafting is practiced. The name lasted until the 16th century and was then written according to its German phonetic form Plau. On 11 January 1994, the name of the city was modified by the addition of am See (on Lake) to remove confusion with the similarly named towns of Plaue, Plauen and Plaue.

== History ==
During World War II, in February 1945, a German-perpetrated death march of Allied prisoners-of-war from the Stalag XX-B POW camp passed through the town.

== Sights ==
At the edge of town, there is a protected forest habitat named Plauer Stadtwald (literally: Plau city forest). Among the sights in town are a historic church building, the ruins of the Burg Plau castle and a bridge that may be vertically lifted to allow boats on the channel below to pass through.

== Notable people ==
- Anna of Mecklenburg-Schwerin (1484-1525), Landgravine of Hesse by marriage.
- Friedrich Lange (1834-1875), history painter and member of the Nazarene movement
- Friedrich Bohndorff (1848-after 1894), German researcher and ornithologist
- Alfred Brunswig (1877-1927), German philosopher
- Rudolf Elvers (1924–2011), musicologist and librarian, particularly of the work of Felix Mendelssohn
- Peter Paetzold (born 1935), German chemist
- Horst-Ulrich Hänel (born 1957), field hockey player. team silver medallist at the 1984 & 1988 Summer Olympics

== Gallery ==
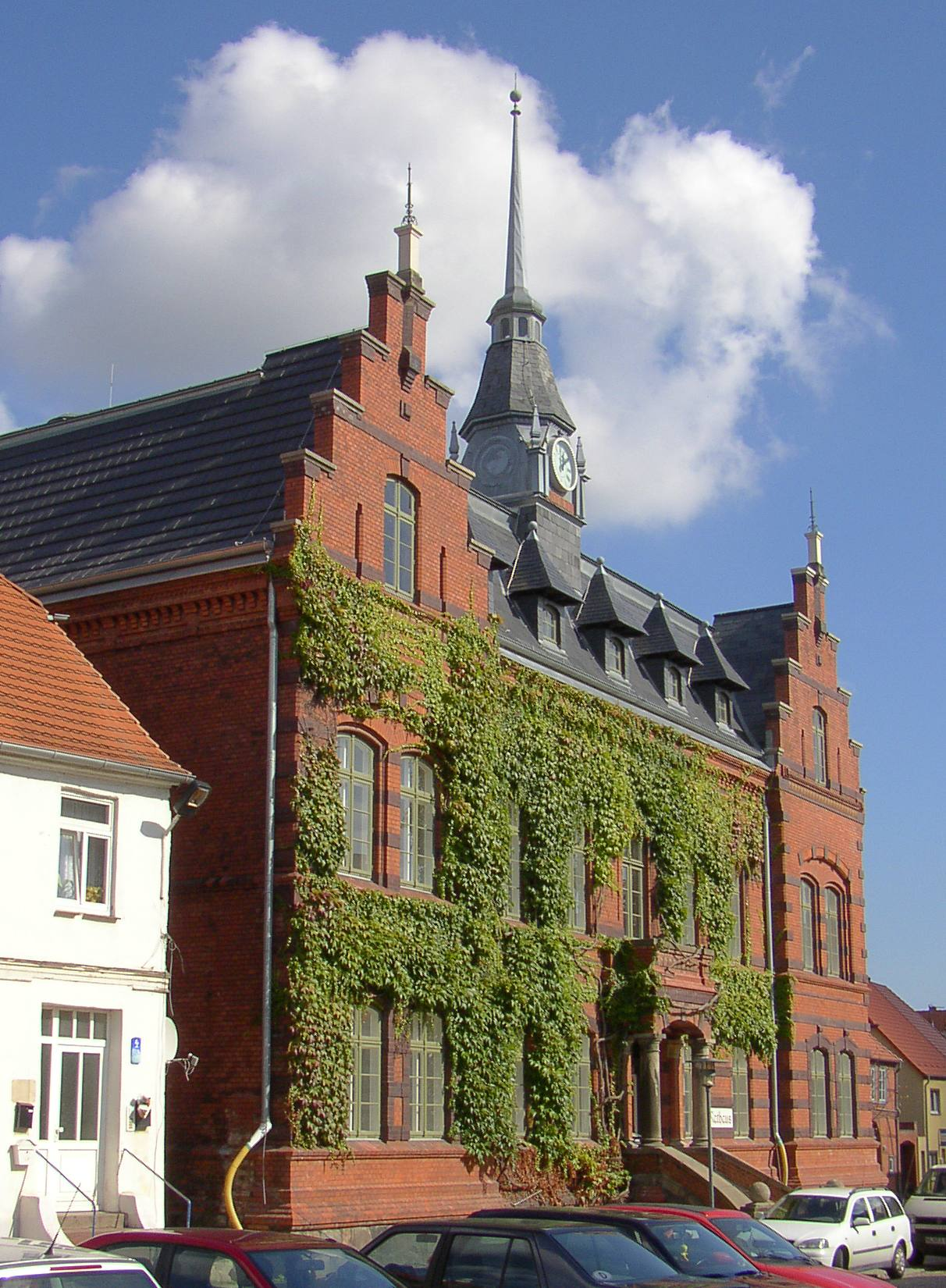
Town hall

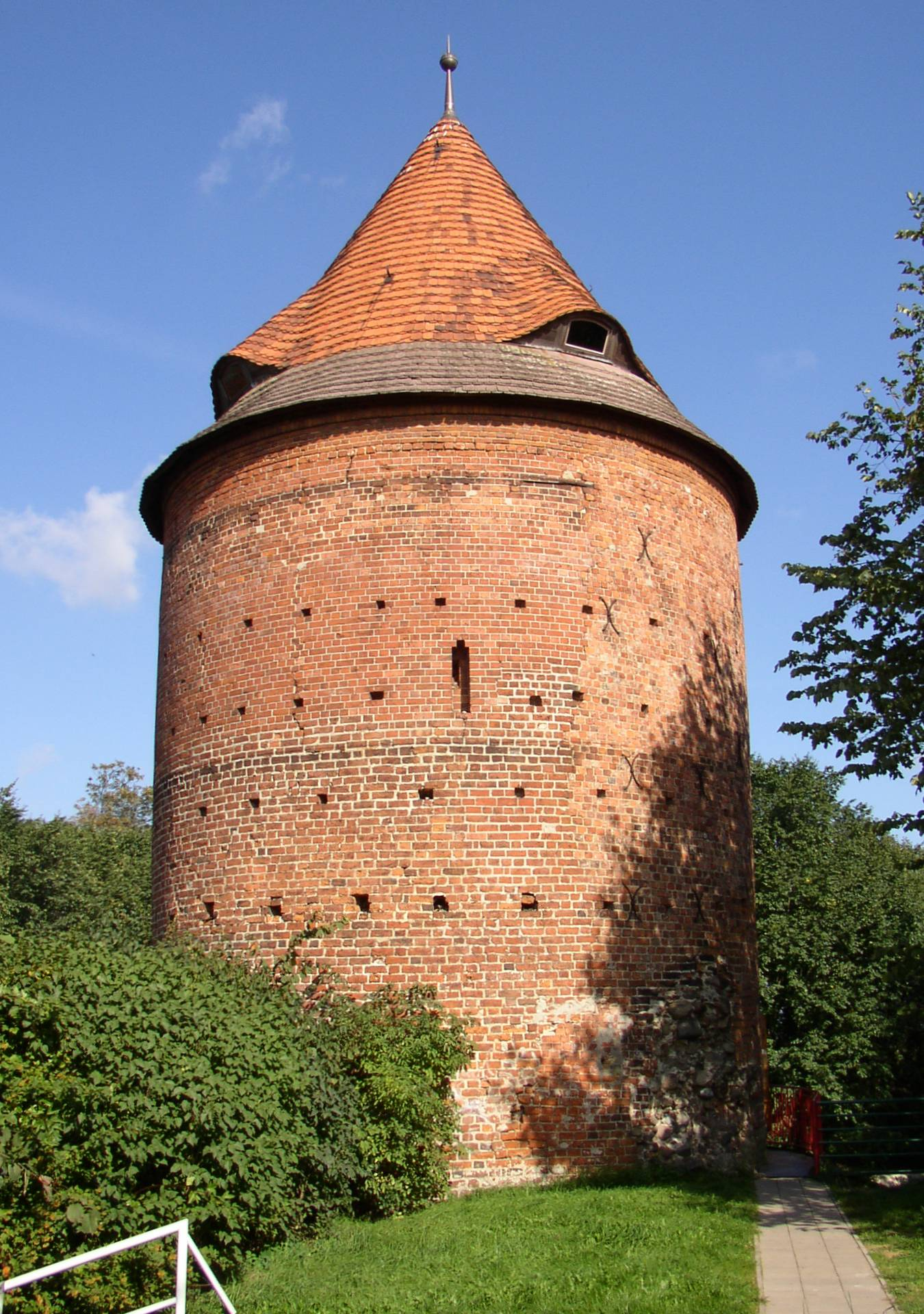
Tower of former castle

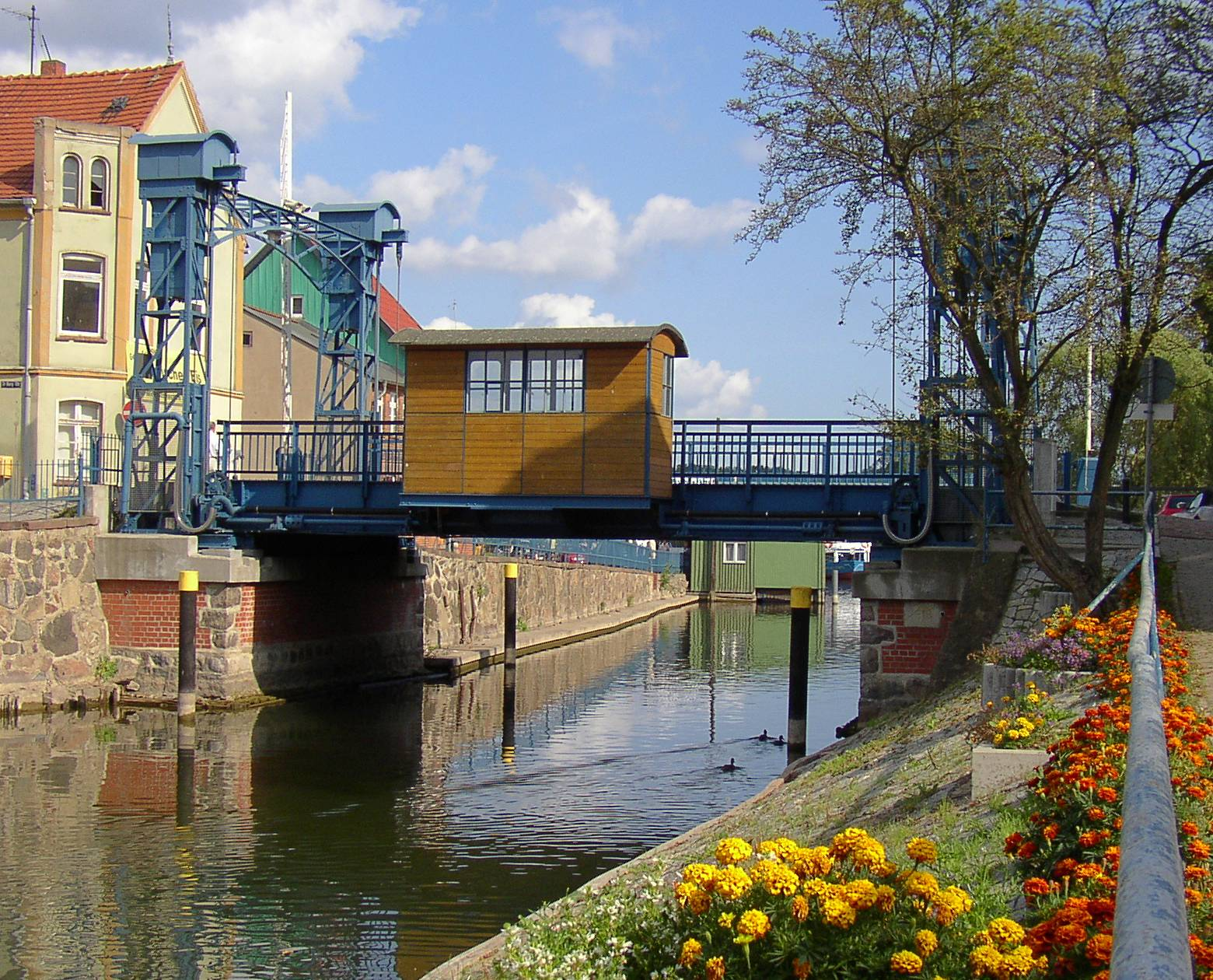
Lift bridge
