= Jabelscher See =

Lake in Germany

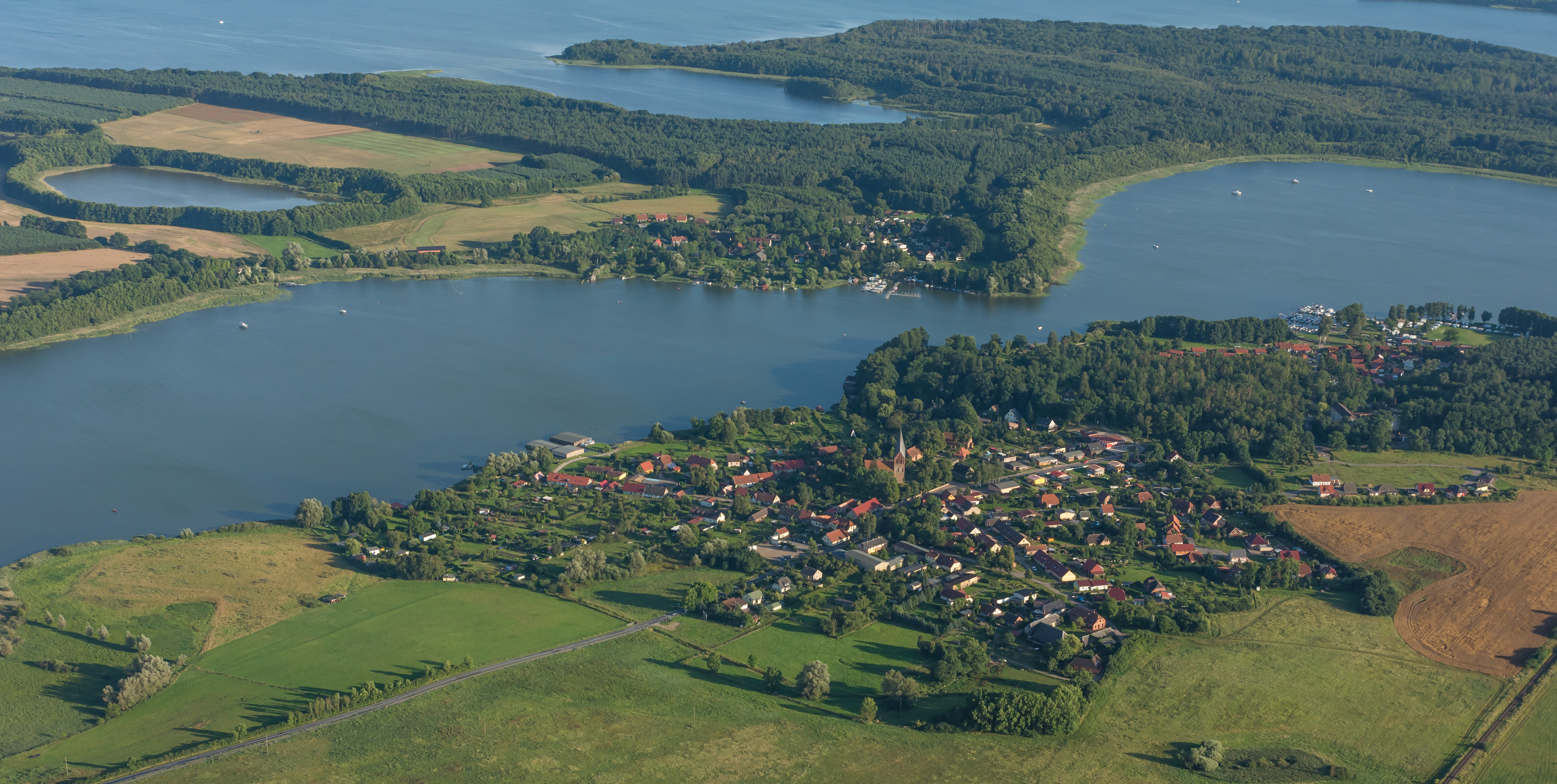
- Jabelscher See, Jabel and surroundings

- Location within Mecklenburg-Vorpommern
- Location: Mecklenburgische Seenplatte, Mecklenburg-Vorpommern
- Coordinates: 53°31′35.89″N 12°32′24.74″E
- Basin countries: Germany
- Surface area: 2.34 km^{2} (0.90 sq mi)
- Surface elevation: 62.1 m (204 ft)

Jabelscher See is a lake in the Mecklenburgische Seenplatte district in Mecklenburg-Vorpommern, Germany. At an elevation of 62.1 m, its surface area is 2.34 km^{2}.
