= Kölpinsee =

Lake in Germany

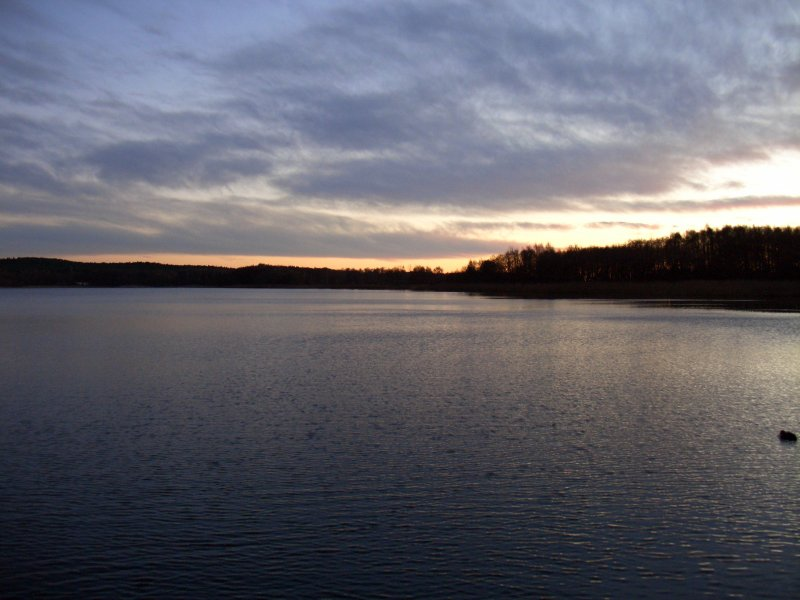

- Location within Mecklenburg-Vorpommern
- Location: Mecklenburgische Seenplatte, Mecklenburg-Vorpommern
- Coordinates: 53°30′3″N 12°34′50″E
- Primary inflows: Elde
- Primary outflows: Elde
- Basin countries: Germany
- Surface area: 20.29 km^{2} (7.83 mi^{2})
- Average depth: 3.5 m (11 ft)
- Max. depth: 30 m (98 ft)
- Surface elevation: 62.1 m (204 ft)

Kölpinsee is a lake in the Mecklenburgische Seenplatte district in Mecklenburg-Vorpommern, Germany. At an elevation of 62.1 metres (204 ft), its surface area is 20.29 square kilometres (7.83 mi^{2}).

The marshy shore of the lake was the probable site of the crash of Avro Lancaster Flight DV202 in August 1943.
