= Fleesensee =

Lake in Mecklenburg-Vorpommern, Germany

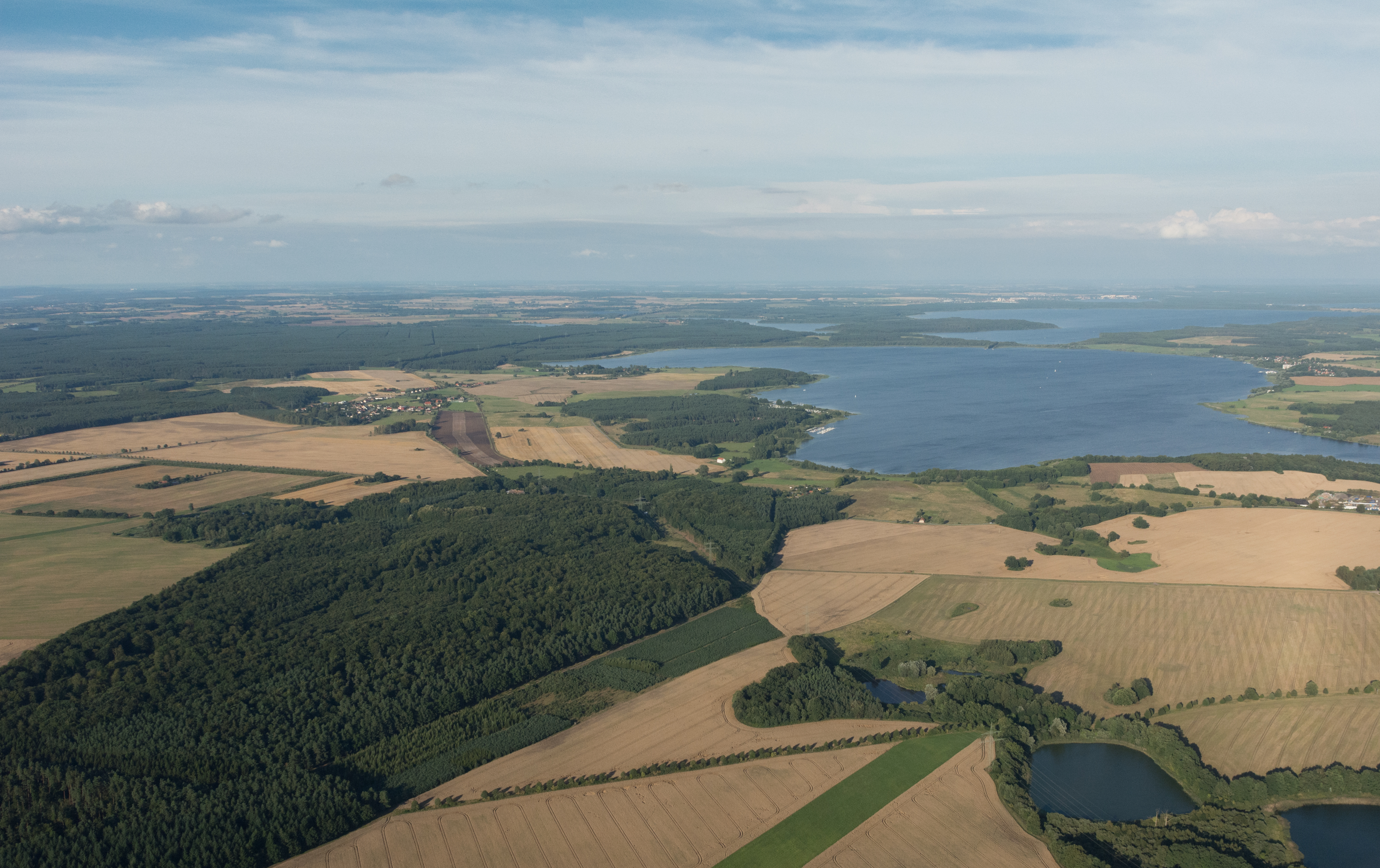
- Aerial view of Fleesensee

- Location within Mecklenburg-Vorpommern
- Location: Mecklenburgische Seenplatte, Mecklenburg-Vorpommern, Germany
- Coordinates: 53°30′8″N 12°28′31″E
- Primary inflows: Elde
- Primary outflows: Elde
- Basin countries: Germany
- Surface area: 10.78 km^{2} (4.16 mi^{2})
- Average depth: 6.1 m (20 ft)
- Max. depth: 26.3 m (86 ft)
- Surface elevation: 62 m (203 ft)
- Settlements: Malchow

Fleesensee is a lake in the Mecklenburgische Seenplatte district in Mecklenburg-Vorpommern, Germany. At an elevation of 62 metres (203 ft), its surface area is 10.78 square kilometres (4.16 mi^{2}).

The lake is both fed and drained by the Elde river. On its shore, located in a part of the municipality Göhren-Lebbin, there is a large vacation resort that was opened in 2000.

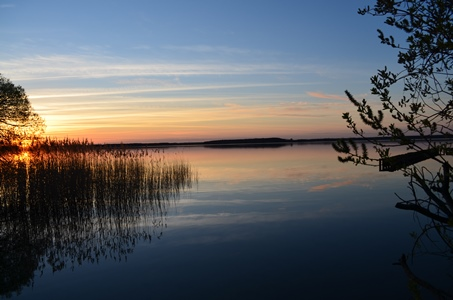
Fleesensee. Mecklenburg Lake District, Germany at sunset
