= Aalbach =

Aalbach may refer to:

- Aalbach (Main), a river of Bavaria and Baden-Württemberg, Germany
- Lößnitz (Nebel), a river of Mecklenburg-Vorpommern, Germany, known in its upper reaches as Aalbach
- Aalbach (Tollense), the outflow of Malliner See, Mecklenburg-Vorpommern, Germany
