= Malliner See =

Lake in Germany

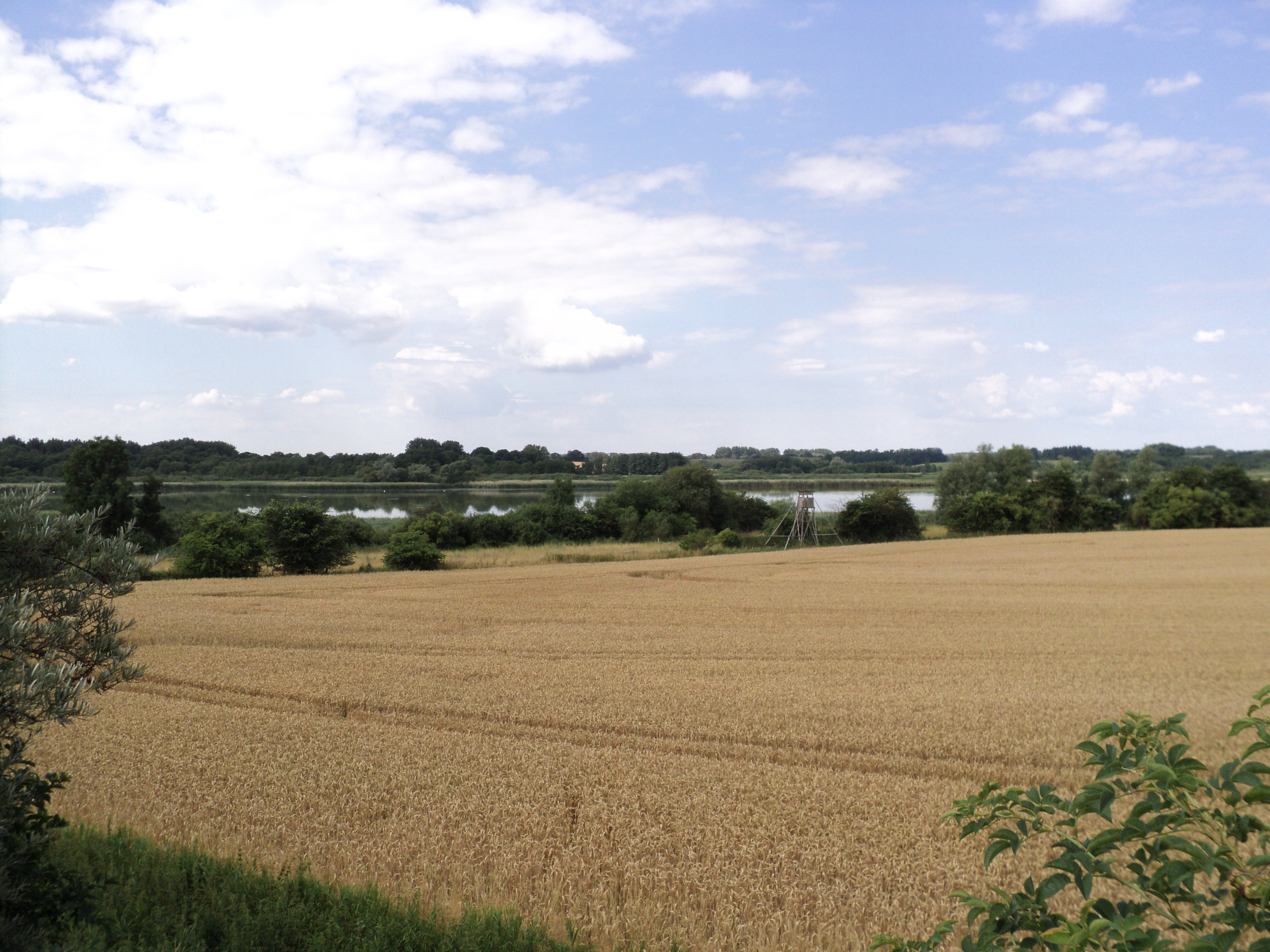
- Malliner See, southern area, seen from the old embankment on the east bank

- Location within Mecklenburg-Vorpommern
- Location: Mecklenburgische Seenplatte, Mecklenburg-Vorpommern
- Coordinates: 53°31′30.01″N 13°6′32.73″E
- Primary inflows: Wurzenbach
- Primary outflows: Aalbach
- Basin countries: Germany
- Surface area: 0.731 km^{2} (0.282 sq mi)
- Surface elevation: 39.6 m (130 ft)

Malliner See is a lake in the Mecklenburgische Seenplatte district in Mecklenburg-Vorpommern, Germany. At an elevation of 39.6 m, its surface area is 0.731 km².
