= Aalbach (Main) =

River in Germany

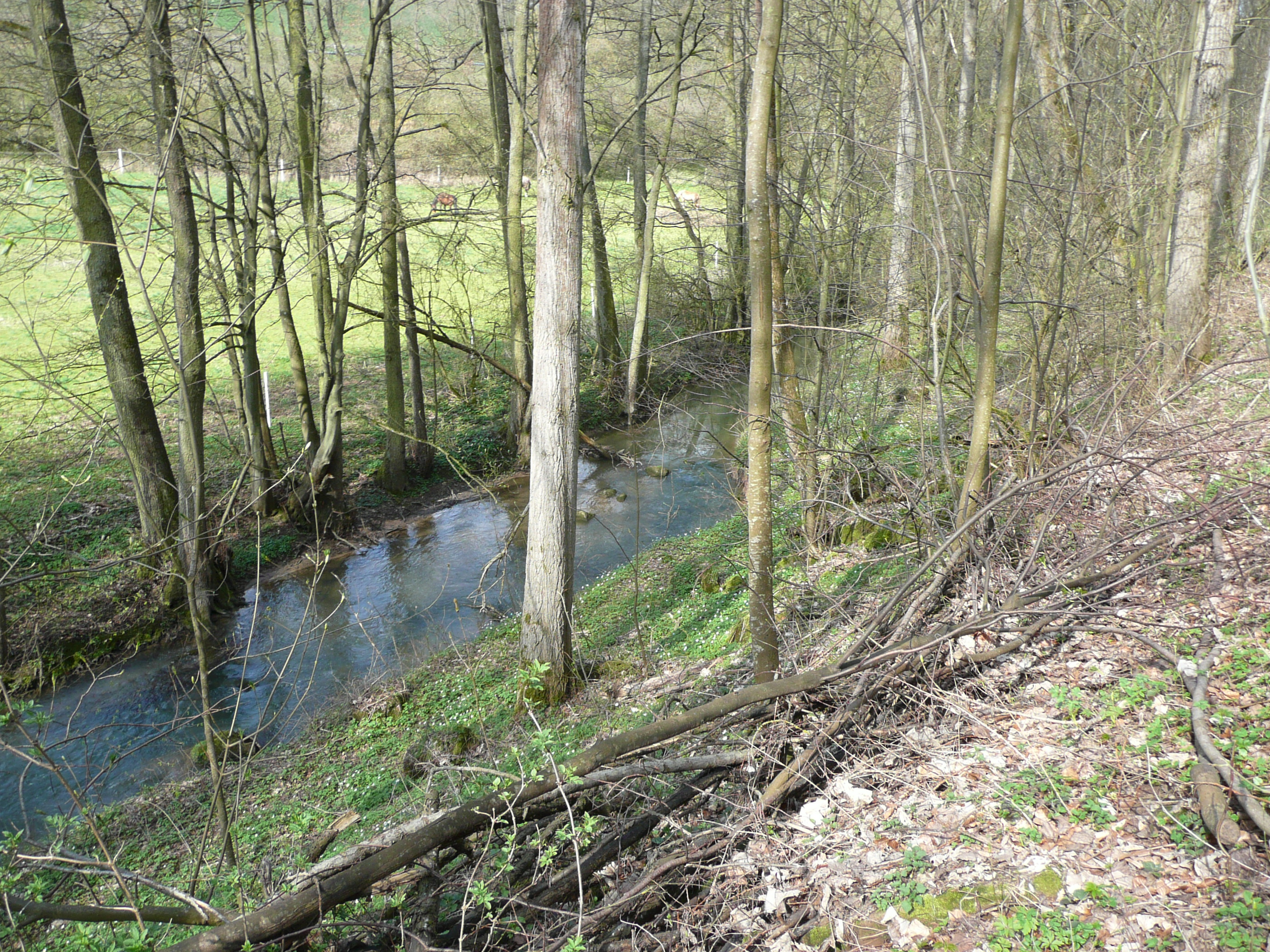
- The Aalbach near Holzkirchen

- Mouth

Location
- Country: Germany
- States: Baden-Württemberg and Bavaria

Physical characteristics
- Mouth
  - location: Main
  - coordinates: 49.7696°N 9.5580°E
- Length: 26.5 km (16.5 mi)

Basin features
- Progression: Main→ Rhine→ North Sea

The Aalbach is a 26.5 km long river in Bavaria and Baden-Württemberg, Germany. It is a left and eastern tributary of the Main near Wertheim am Main.

== See also ==
- List of rivers of Baden-Württemberg
- List of rivers of Bavaria
