= Caarpsee =

Lake in Mecklenburg-Vorpommern, Germany

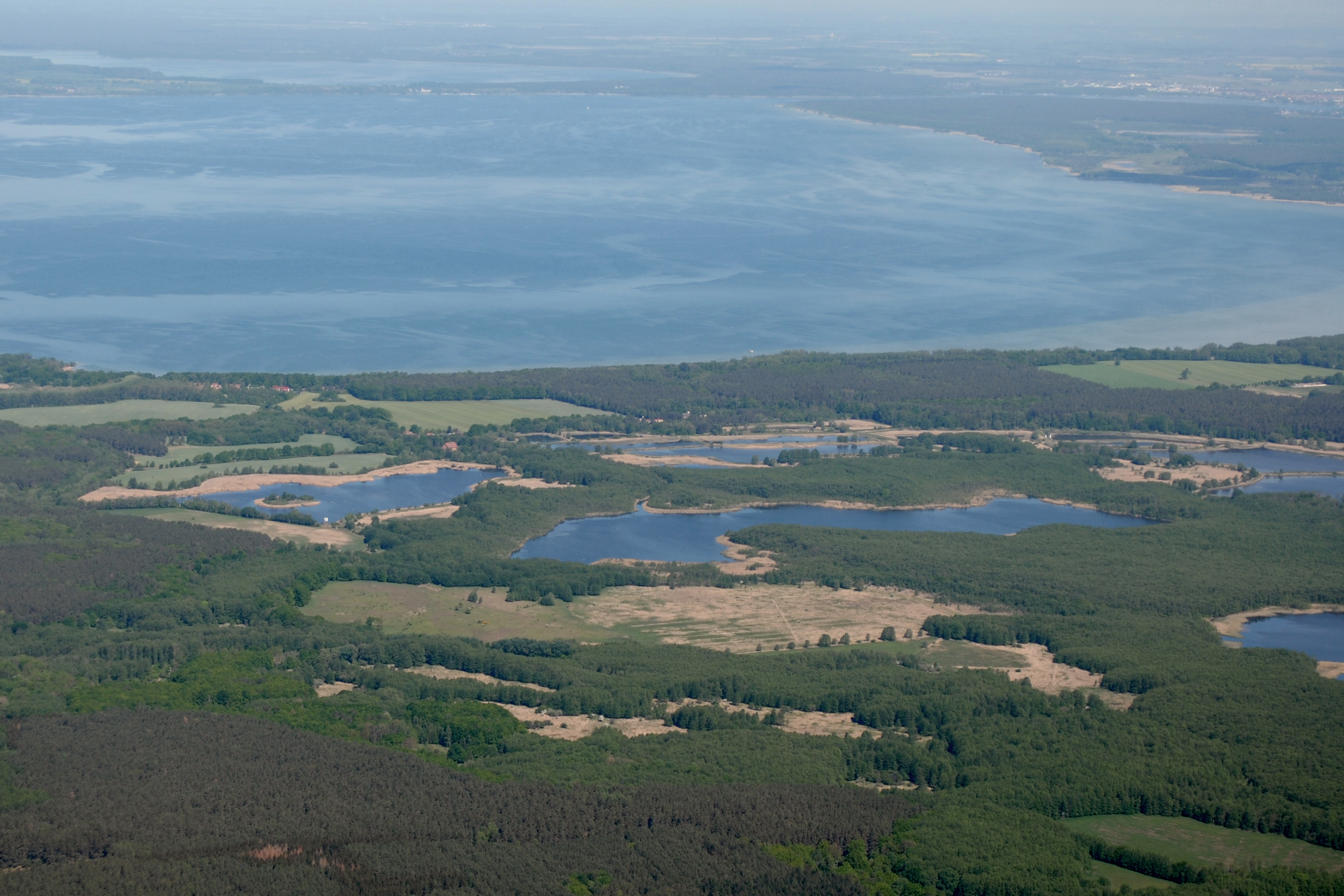

- Location within Mecklenburg-Vorpommern
- Location: Mecklenburgische Seenplatte, Mecklenburg-Vorpommern
- Coordinates: 53.36803°N 12.79386°E
- Basin countries: Germany
- Surface area: 0.412 km^{2} (0.159 sq mi)
- Surface elevation: 58.8 m (193 ft)

Caarpsee is a lake located in the Mecklenburgische Seenplatte district in Mecklenburg-Vorpommern, Germany. It sits at an elevation of 58.8 m and covers a surface area of 0.412 km². It lies between the larger Woterfitzsee and the Fischteichen, approximately two kilometers east of the Müritz near the towns of Rechlin and Boek. Carpsee has a north-south extension of about 1100 meters and a west-east extension of about 300 meters.

The lake is located within the care zone of the Müritz National Park and can only be crossed from the Bolter canal to the Woterfitzsee along the concrete. Motorboats are not allowed on the Caarpsee.
