= Woterfitzsee =

Lake in Mecklenburg-Vorpommern, Germany

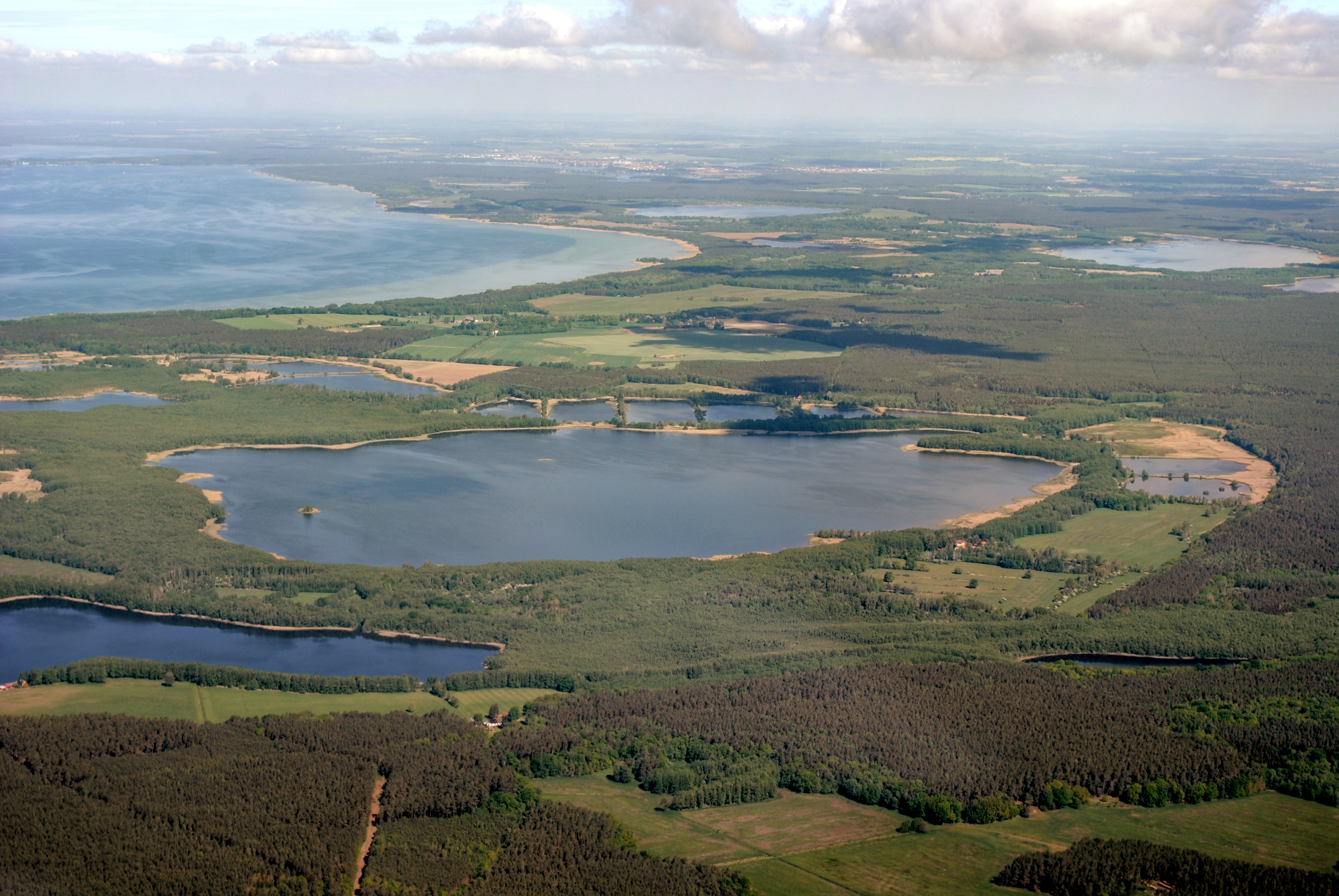
- Woterfitzsee Lake

- Location within Mecklenburg-Vorpommern
- Location: Mecklenburgische Seenplatte, Mecklenburg-Vorpommern
- Coordinates: 53°22′5″N 12°49′26″E
- Primary inflows: Bolter Kanal
- Basin countries: Germany
- Surface area: 2.9 km^{2} (1.1 sq mi)
- Average depth: 3.4 m (11 ft)
- Max. depth: 7.8 m (26 ft)
- Surface elevation: 58.8 m (193 ft)

Woterfitzsee is a lake in the Mecklenburgische Seenplatte district in Mecklenburg-Vorpommern, Germany. At an elevation of 58.8 m, its surface area is 2.9 km².
