= Prolegomena to Any Future Metaphysics =

1783 book by Immanuel Kant

Prolegomena to Any Future Metaphysics That Will Be Able to Present Itself as a Science
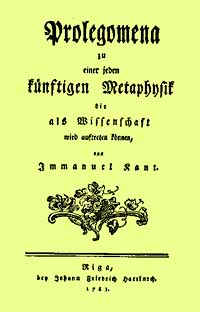
- Author: Immanuel Kant
- Original title: Prolegomena zu einer jeden künftigen Metaphysik, die als Wissenschaft wird auftreten können
- Language: German
- Subject: Metaphysics
- Published: 1783
- Media type: Print

Prolegomena to Any Future Metaphysics That Will Be Able to Present Itself as a Science (German: Prolegomena zu einer jeden künftigen Metaphysik, die als Wissenschaft wird auftreten können) is a book by German philosopher Immanuel Kant, published in 1783, two years after the first edition of his Critique of Pure Reason. One of Kant's shorter works, it contains a summary of the Critique‘s main conclusions, sometimes by arguments Kant had not used in the Critique. Kant characterizes his more accessible approach here as an "analytic" one, as opposed to the Critique‘s "synthetic" examination of successive faculties of the mind and their principles.

The book is also intended as a polemic. Kant was disappointed by the poor reception of the Critique of Pure Reason, and here he repeatedly emphasizes the importance of its critical project for the very existence of metaphysics as a science. The final appendix contains a response to an unfavorable review of the Critique.

== Contents ==
=== Introduction ===
Kant declared that the Prolegomena are for the use of both learners and teachers as an heuristic way to discover a science of metaphysics. Unlike other sciences, metaphysics has not yet attained universal and permanent knowledge. There are no standards to distinguish truth from error. Kant asked, "Can metaphysics even be possible?"

David Hume investigated the problem of the origin of the concept of causality. Is the concept of causality truly independent of experience or is it learned from experience? Hume mistakenly attempted to derive the concept of causality from experience. He thought that causality was really based on seeing two objects that were always together in past experience. If causality is not dependent on experience, however, then it may be applied to metaphysical objects, such as an omnipotent God or an immortal soul. Kant claimed to have logically deduced how causality and other pure concepts originate from human understanding itself, not from experiencing the external world.

Unlike the Critique of Pure Reason, which was written in the synthetic style, Kant wrote the Prolegomena using the analytical method. He divided the question regarding the possibility of metaphysics as a science into three parts. In so doing, he investigated the three problems of the possibility of pure mathematics, pure natural science, and metaphysics in general. His result allowed him to determine the bounds of pure reason and to answer the question regarding the possibility of metaphysics as a science.

=== Preamble on the peculiarities of all metaphysical knowledge ===
§ 1. On the sources of metaphysics

Metaphysical principles are a priori in that they are not derived from external or internal experience. Metaphysical knowledge is philosophical cognition that comes from pure understanding and pure reason.

§ 2. Concerning the kind of knowledge which can alone be called metaphysical

a. On the distinction between analytical and synthetical judgments in general

Analytical judgments are explicative. They express nothing in the predicate but what has already been actually thought in the concept of the subject. Synthetical judgments are expansive. The predicate contains something that is not actually thought in the concept of the subject. It amplifies knowledge by adding something to the subject's concept.

b. The common principle of all analytical judgments is the law of contradiction

The predicate of an affirmative analytical judgment is already contained in the concept of the subject, of which it cannot be denied without contradiction. All analytical judgments are a priori.

c. Synthetical judgments require a principle that is different from the law of contradiction.

1. Judgments of experience are always synthetical.

Analytical judgments are not based on experience. They are based merely on the subject's concept.

2. Mathematical judgments are all synthetical.

Pure mathematical knowledge is different from all other a priori knowledge. It is synthetical and cannot be known from mere conceptual analysis. Mathematics require the intuitive construction of concepts. This intuitive construction implies an a priori view of the concept constructed in the mind. In the Critique of Pure Reason, Kant elaborates on this, explaining that "to construct a concept means to exhibit a priori the intuition corresponding to it.” Arithmetical sums are the result of the addition of intuited counters. Geometrical concepts, such as "shortest distance," are known only through exhibiting the concept in pure intuition.

Some other principles, assumed by geometers, are indeed actually analytical, and depend on the law of contradiction; but they only serve, as identical propositions, as a method of concatenation, and not as principles, e.g., a = a, the whole is equal to itself, or a + b > a, the whole is greater than its part. And yet even these, though they are recognised as valid from mere concepts, are only admitted in mathematics, because they can be represented in some visual form (Anschauung). What usually makes us believe that the predicate of such apodeictic^{8} judgments is already contained in our concept, and that the judgment is therefore analytical, is the duplicity of the expression, requesting us to think a certain predicate as of necessity implied in the thought of a given concept, which necessity attaches to the concept. But the question is not what we are requested to join in thought to the given concept, but what we actually think together with and in it, though obscurely; and so it appears that the predicate belongs to these concepts necessarily indeed, yet not directly but indirectly by an added visualisation (Anschauung).

3. Metaphysical judgments, properly so called, are all synthetical.

Concepts and judgments pertaining to metaphysics may be analytical. These may not be metaphysical but can be combined to make a priori, synthetical, metaphysical judgments. For example, the analytical judgment "substance only exists as subject" can be used to make the judgment "all substance is permanent," which is a synthetical and properly metaphysical judgment.

§ 3. A remark on the general division of judgment into analytical and synthetical.

This division is critical but has not been properly recognized by previous philosophers.

§ 4. The general question of the Prolegomena: Is metaphysics at all possible?

The Critique of Pure Reason investigates this question synthetically. In it, an abstract examination of the concepts of the sources of pure reason results in knowledge of the actual science of metaphysics. The Prolegomena, on the other hand, starts with the known fact that there is actual synthetic a priori metaphysical knowledge of pure mathematics and pure natural science. From this knowledge, analytically, we arrive at the sources of the possibility of metaphysics.

§ 5. The general problem: How is knowledge from pure reason possible?

By using the analytical method, we start from the fact that there are actual synthetic a priori propositions and then inquire into the conditions of their possibility. In so doing, we learn the limits of pure reason.

=== Part one of the main transcendental problem. How is pure mathematics possible? ===
§ 6. Mathematics consists of synthetic a priori knowledge. How was it possible for human reason to produce such a priori knowledge? If we understand the origins of mathematics, we might know the basis of all knowledge that is not derived from experience.

§ 7. All mathematical knowledge consists of concepts that are derived from intuitions. These intuitions, however, are not based on experience.

§ 8. How is it possible to intuit anything a priori? How can the intuition of the object occur before the experience of the object?

§ 9. My intuition of an object can occur before I experience an object if my intuition contains only the mere form of sensory experience.

§ 10. We can intuit things a priori only through the mere form of sensuous intuition. In so doing, we can only know objects as they appear to us, not as they are in themselves, apart from our sensations. Mathematics is not an analysis of concepts. Mathematical concepts are constructed from a synthesis of intuitions. Geometry is based on the pure intuition of space. The arithmetical concept of number is constructed from the successive addition of units in time. Pure mechanics uses time to construct motion. Space and time are pure a priori intuitions. They are the mere forms of our sensations and exist in us prior to all of our intuitions of objects. Space and time are a priori knowledge of a sensed object as it appears to an observer.

§ 11. The problem of a priori intuition is solved. The pure a priori intuition of space and time is the basis of empirical a posteriori intuition. Synthetic a priori mathematical knowledge refers to empirically sensed objects. A priori intuition relates to the mere form of sensibility; it makes the appearance of objects possible. The a priori form of a phenomenal object is space and time. The a posteriori matter of a phenomenal object is sensation, which is not affected by pure, a priori intuition. The subjective a priori pure forms of sensation, namely space and time, are the basis of mathematics and of all of the objective a posteriori phenomena to which mathematics refers.

§ 12. The concept of pure, a priori intuition can be illustrated by geometrical congruence, the three–dimensionality of space, and the boundlessness of infinity. These cannot be shown or inferred from concepts. They can only be known through pure intuition. Pure mathematics is possible because we intuit space and time as the mere form of phenomena.

§ 13. The difference between similar things which are not congruent cannot be made intelligible by understanding and thinking about any concept. They can only be made intelligible by being intuited or perceived. For example, the difference of chirality is of this nature. So, also, is the difference seen in mirror images. Right hands and ears are similar to left hands and ears. They are not, however, congruent. These objects are not things as they are apart from their appearance. They are known only through sensuous intuition. The form of external sensible intuition is space. Time is the form of internal sense. Time and space are mere forms of our sense intuition and are not qualities of things in themselves apart from our sensuous intuition.

Remark I. Pure mathematics, including pure geometry, has objective reality when it refers to objects of sense. Pure mathematical propositions are not creations of imagination. They are necessarily valid of space and all of its phenomenal objects because a priori mathematical space is the foundational form of all a posteriori external appearance.

Remark II. Berkeleian Idealism denies the existence of things in themselves. The Critique of Pure Reason, however, asserts that it is uncertain whether or not external objects are given, and we can only know their existence as a mere appearance. Unlike Locke's view, space is also known as a mere appearance, not as a thing existing in itself.

Remark III. Sensuous knowledge represents things only in the way that they affect our senses. Appearances, not things as they exist in themselves, are known through the senses. Space, time, and all appearances in general are mere modes of representation. Space and time are ideal, subjective, and exist a priori in all of our representations. They apply to all of the objects of the sensible world because these objects exist as mere appearances. Such objects are not dreams or illusions, though. The difference between truth and dreaming or illusion depends on the connection of representations according to rules of true experience. A false judgment can be made if we take a subjective representation as being objective. All the propositions of geometry are true of space and all of the objects that are in space. Therefore, they are true of all possible experience. If space is considered to be the mere form of sensibility, the propositions of geometry can be known a priori concerning all objects of external intuition.

=== Part two of the main transcendental problem. How is pure natural science possible? ===
§ 14. An observer can't know anything about objects that exist in themselves, apart from being observed. Things in themselves cannot be known a priori because this would be a mere analysis of concepts. Neither can the nature of things in themselves be known a posteriori. Experience can never give laws of nature that describe how things in themselves must necessarily exist completely apart from an observer's experience.

§ 15. The universal science of nature contains a pure science of nature, as well as an empirical science of nature. The pure science of nature is a priori and expresses laws to which nature must necessarily conform. Two of its principles are "substance is permanent" and "every event has a cause." How is it possible that there are such a priori universal laws of nature?

§ 16. There is a priori knowledge of nature that precedes all experience. This pure knowledge is actual and can be confirmed by natural experience. We are not concerned with any so–called knowledge that cannot be verified by experience.

§ 17. The a priori conditions that make experience possible are also the sources of the universal laws of nature. How is this possible?

§ 18. Judgments of experience are empirical judgments that are valid for external objects. They require special pure concepts which have originated in the pure understanding. All judging subjects will agree on their experience of the object. When a perception is subsumed under these pure concepts, it is changed into objective experience. On the other hand, all empirical judgments that are only valid for the one judging subject are judgments of mere perception. These judgments of perception are not subsumed under a pure concept of the understanding.

§ 19. We cannot immediately and directly know an object as it is apart from the way that it appears. However, if we say that a judgment must be valid for all observers, then we are making a valid statement about an object. Judgments of experience are valid judgments about an object because they necessarily connect everyone's perceptions of the object through the use of a pure concept of the understanding.

§ 20. A judgment of perception is a connection of perceptions in a subject's mind. For example, "When the sun shines on a stone, the stone becomes warm." A judgment of perception has no necessary universality and therefore no objective validity. A judgment of perception can become a judgment of experience, as in "The sun warms the stone." This occurs when the subject's perceptions are connected according to the form of a pure concept of the understanding. These pure concepts of the understanding are the general forms that any object must assume in order to be experienced.

§ 21. In general, judgments about any perception whatsoever have the following forms:

1.Quantity of Judgements
- Universal (All Xs are A)
- Particular (Some Xs are A)
- Singular (The X is A)

2.Quality
- Affirmative (X is an A)
- Negative (X is not an A)
- Infinite (X is a non-A)

3.Relation
- Categorical (X is A)
- Hypothetical (If A then B)
- Disjunctive (X is either A or B)

4.Modality
- Problematic (X can be A)
- Assertoric (X is A)
- Apodeictic (X must be A)

In general concepts abstracted from any perceptions whatsoever have the following forms:

1.Categories of Quantity
- Unity
- Plurality
- Totality

2.Categories of Quality
- Reality
- Negation
- Limitation

3.Categories of Relation
- Subsistence and Inherence (substance and accident)
- Causality and Dependence (cause and effect)
- Community (reciprocity between agent and patient)

4.Categories of Modality
- Possibility—Impossibility
- Existence—Non-existence
- Necessity—Contingency

Universal scientific principles, about any and all natural phenomena whatsoever, have the following forms:

	1.Axioms of Intuition
2.Anticipations of Perception		3.Analogies of Experience
	4.Postulates of Empirical Thinking Generally

§ 21a. This Prolegomena is a critique of the understanding and it discusses the form and content of experience. It is not an empirical psychology that is concerned with the origin of experience. Experience consists of sense perceptions, judgments of perception, and judgments of experience. A judgment of experience includes what experience in general contains. This kind of judgment results when a sense perception and a judgment of perception are unified by a concept that makes the judgment necessary and valid for all perceivers.

§ 22. The senses intuit. The understanding thinks, or judges. Experience is generated when a concept of the understanding is added to a sense perception. The pure concepts of the understanding are concepts under which all sense perceptions must be subsumed [subsumirt] before they can be used in judgments of experience. A synthesis of perception then becomes necessary, universally valid, and representative of an experienced object.

§ 23. Pure a priori principles of possible experience bring mere phenomenal appearances under pure concepts of the understanding. This makes the empirical judgment valid in reference to an external object. These principles are universal laws of nature which are known before any experience. This solves the second question "How is the pure science of nature possible?". A logical system consists of the forms of all judgments in general. A transcendental system is made up of the pure concepts which are the conditions of all synthetical, necessary judgments. A physical system, which is a universal and pure science of nature, contains pure principles of all possible experience.

§ 24. The first physical principle of pure understanding subsumes all spatial and temporal phenomenal appearances under the concept of quantity. All appearances are extensive magnitudes. It is the principle of the axioms of intuition.

The second physical principle subsumes sensation under the concept of quality. All sensations exhibit a degree, or intensive magnitude, of sensed reality. This is the principle of the anticipations of perception.

§ 25. In order for a relationship between appearances to be valid as an objective experience, it must be formulated in accordance with an a priori concept. The concepts of substance/accident, cause/effect, and action/reaction (community) constitute a priori principles that turn subjective appearances into objective experiences. The concept of substance relates appearances to existence. The concepts of cause and community relate appearances to other appearances. The principles that are made of these concepts are the real, dynamical [Newtonian] laws of nature.

Appearances are related to experience in general as being possible, actual, or necessary. Judgments of experience, that are thought or spoken, are formulated by using these modes of expression.

§ 26. The table of the Universal Principles of Natural Science is perfect and complete. Its principles are limited only to possible experience. The principle of the axioms of intuition states that appearances in space and time are thought of as quantitative, having extensive magnitude. The principle of the anticipations of perception states that an appearance's sensed reality has degree, or intensive magnitude. The principles of the analogies of experience state that perceptual appearances, not things in themselves, are thought of as experienced objects, in accordance with a priori rules of the understanding.

§ 27. Hume wrote that we cannot rationally comprehend cause and effect (causality). Kant added that we also cannot rationally comprehend substance and accident (subsistence) or action and reaction (community). Yet he denied that these concepts are derived from experience. He also denied that their necessity was false and merely an illusion resulting from habit. These concepts and the principles that they constitute are known before experience and are valid when they are applied to the experience of objects.

§ 28. We cannot know anything about the relations of things in themselves or of mere appearances. When we speak or think about objects of experience, however, they must necessarily have the relations of subsistence, causality, and community. These concepts constitute the principles of the possibility of our experience.

§ 29. With regard to causality, we start with the logical form of a hypothetical judgment. We can make a subjective judgment of perception and say, "If the sun shines long enough on a body, then the body will become warm." This, however, is an empirical rule that is valid merely of appearances in one consciousness. If I want to make an objective, universally valid hypothetical judgment, however, I must make it in the form of causality. As such, I say, "The sun is the cause of heat." This is a universal and necessary law that is valid for the possibility of objective experience. Experience is the valid knowledge of the way that appearances succeed each other as objects. This knowledge is expressed in the form of a hypothetical [if/then] judgment. The concept of causality refers to thoughts and statements about the way that successive appearances and perceptions are universally and necessarily experienced as objects, in any consciousness.

§ 30. The principles that contain the reference of the pure concepts of the understanding to the sensed world can only be used to think or speak of experienced objects, not things in themselves. These pure concepts are not derived from experience. Experience is derived from these pure concepts. This solves Hume's problem regarding the pure concept of causality.

Pure mathematics and pure natural science can never refer to anything other than mere appearances. They can only represent either (1) that which makes experience in general possible, or (2) that which must always be capable of being represented in some possible particular experience.

§ 31. By this method, we have gained definite knowledge with reference to metaphysics. Unscientific researchers could also say that we can never reach, with our reason, beyond experience. They, however, have no grounds for their assertion.

§ 32. Former philosophers claimed that the sensible world was an illusion. The intelligible world, they said, was real and actual. Critical philosophy, however, acknowledges that objects of sense are mere appearances, but they are usually not illusions. They are appearances of a thing in itself, which cannot be directly known. Our pure concepts [causality, subsistence, etc.] and pure intuitions [space, time] refer only to objects of possible sense experience. They are meaningless when referred to objects that cannot be experienced.

§ 33. Our pure concepts of the understanding are not derived from experience and they also contain strict necessity, which experience never attains. As a result, we are tempted to use them to think and speak about objects of thought that transcend experience. This is a transcendent and illegitimate use.

§ 34. Unlike empirical concepts, which are grounded on sense perceptions, the pure concepts of the understanding are based on schemata. This is explained in the Critique of Pure Reason, A 137 ff. The objects thus produced occur only in experience. In the Critique, A 236 ff., it is explained that nothing that is beyond experience can be meaningfully thought by using the pure concepts without sense perception.

§ 35. The understanding, which thinks, should never wander beyond the bounds of experience. It keeps the imagination in check. The impossibility of thinking about unnatural beings should be demonstrated with scientific certainty.

§ 36. The constitution of our five senses and the way that they provide data makes nature possible materially, as a totality of appearances in space and time. The constitution of our understanding makes nature possible formally, as a totality of rules that regulate appearances in order for them to be thought of as connected in experience. We derive the laws of nature from the conditions of their necessary unity in one consciousness. We can know, before any experience, the universal laws of nature because they are derived from our sensibility and understanding. Nature and the possibility of experience in general are the same. The understanding does not derive its a priori laws from nature. The understanding prescribes laws to nature.

§ 37. The necessary laws of nature that we seem to discover in perceived objects have actually been derived from our own understanding.

§ 38. According to natural law, gravitation decreases inversely as the square of the surfaces, over which this force spreads, increases. Is this law found in space itself? No, it is found in the way that the understanding knows space. The understanding is the origin of the universal order of nature. It comprehends all appearances under its own laws. In so doing, it produces the form by which all experienced objects that appear to us are necessarily subject to its laws.

§ 39. Appendix to pure natural science. On the system of the categories.

The Kantian categories constitute a complete, necessary system of concepts and thus lead to comprehension. These concepts constitute the form of connection between the concepts that occur in all empirical knowledge. To make a table of pure concepts, a distinction was made between the pure elementary concepts of the sensibility and those of the understanding. The former are space and time. The latter are the pure concepts or categories. The list is complete, necessary, and certain because it is based on a principle or rule. This principle is that thinking in general is judging. A table of the functions of judgments, when applied to objects in general, becomes a table of pure concepts of the understanding. These concepts, and only these, are our whole knowledge of things by pure understanding.

These pure concepts are logical functions and do not, by themselves, produce a concept of an object. To do so, they need to be based on sensuous intuition. Their use is limited to experience.

The systematic table of categories is used as a clue in the investigation of complete metaphysical knowledge. It was used in the Critique as a pattern for research on, among other things, the soul (A 344), the universe (A 415), and nothingness (A 292).

=== Part three of the main transcendental problem. How is metaphysics in general possible? ===
§ 40. The truth or the objective reality of the concepts that are used in metaphysics cannot be discovered or confirmed by experience. Metaphysics is subjectively actual because its problems occur to everyone as a result of the nature of their reason. How, however, is metaphysics objectively possible? The concepts of reason are transcendent because they are concerned with the absolute totality of all possible experience. Reason doesn't know when to stop asking, "why?." Such an absolute totality cannot be experienced. The corresponding objects of the necessary Ideas of reason cannot be given in experience and are misleading illusions. Only through self–knowledge can reason prevent the consideration of the immanent, subjective, guiding Ideas as being transcendent objects.

§ 41. In order to establish metaphysics as a science, a clear distinction must be made between the categories (pure concepts of the understanding) and the Ideas (pure concepts of reason).

§ 42. The concepts of the understanding appear in experience. They are confirmed by experience. On the other hand, the transcendent concepts of reason cannot be confirmed or refuted by experience because they don't appear in experience. Reason must introspectively investigate itself in order to avoid errors, illusions, and dialectical problems.

§ 43. The origin of the transcendental Ideas is the three forms of syllogism that reason uses in its activity. The first Idea is based on the categorical syllogism. It is the psychological Idea of the complete substantial subject. This Idea results in a paralogism, or unwittingly false dialectical reasoning. The second Idea is based on the hypothetical syllogism. It is the cosmological Idea of the complete series of conditions. This Idea results in an antinomy, or contradiction. The third Idea is based on the disjunctive syllogism. It is the theological Idea of the complete complex of everything that is possible. This Idea results in the dialectical problem of the Ideal. In this way, reason and its claims are completely and systematically considered.

§ 44. The Ideas of reason are useless, and even detrimental, to the understanding of nature. Is the soul a simple substance? Did the world have a beginning or did it always exist? Did a Supreme Being design nature? Reason, however, can help to make understanding complete. To do this, reason's Ideas are thought of as though they are known objects.

§ 45. Prefatory Remark to the Dialectic of Pure Reason.

Reason continues to ask "why?" and will not be satisfied until a final thing in itself is experienced and understood. This, however, is a deceitful illusion. This transcendent and unbounded abuse of knowledge must be restrained by toilsome, laborious scientific instruction.

I. The Psychological Ideas (wrongly use Reason beyond experience)

§ 46. Substance (subject) cannot be known. Only accidents (predicates) can be known. Substance is a mere Idea, not an object. Pure reason, however, wrongly wants to know the subject of every predicate. Every subject, however, is a predicate for yet another subject, and so on as far as our knowledge of predicates extends. We can never know an ultimate subject or absolute substance. We seem to have an ego, though, which is a thinking subject for our thoughts. The ego, however, is not known. It is only a conceptless feeling of an existence and a representation of something that is related to all thinking.

§ 47. We can call this thinking self, or soul, a substance. We can say that is an ultimate subject that is not the predicate of yet another subject. Substances, though, are permanent. If we cannot prove that the soul is permanent, then it is an empty, insignificant concept. The synthetical a priori proposition "the thinking subject is permanent" can only be proved if it is an object of experience.

§ 48. Substances can be said to be permanent only if we are going to associate them with possible or actual experience. We can never think of substances as independent of all experience. The soul, or thinking substance, cannot be proved to be permanent and immortal, because death is the end of experience. Only living beings can have experiences. We cannot prove anything about a person's thinking substance (soul) after the person dies.

§49. We know only appearances, not things in themselves. Actual bodies are external appearances in space. My soul, self, or ego is an internal appearance in time. Bodies, as appearances of my outer sense, do not exist apart from my thoughts. I myself, as an appearance of my inner sense, do not exist apart from being my representation in time and cannot be known to be immortal. Space and time are forms of my sensibility and whatever exists in them is a real appearance that I experience. These appearances are connected in space and time according to universal laws of experience. Anything that cannot be experienced in space or time is nothing to us and does not exist for us.

II. The Cosmological Ideas (wrongly use Reason beyond experience)

§50. The Cosmological Idea is cosmological because it is concerned with sensually experienced objects and it is an Idea because the ultimate condition which it seeks can never be experienced. Because its objects can be sensed, the Cosmological Idea wouldn't usually be considered to be a mere Idea. However, it outruns experience when it seeks the ultimate condition for all conditioned objects. In so doing, it is a mere Idea.

§ 51. There are four Cosmological Ideas. They mistakenly refer to the completeness, which can never be experienced, of a series of conditions. Pure reason makes four kinds of contradictory assertions about these Ideas. These antinomies result from the nature of human reason and cannot be avoided.

1. Thesis: The world has a temporal and spatial beginning or limit. Antithesis: The world does not have a temporal and spatial beginning or limit .

2. Thesis: Everything in the world consists of something that is simple. Antithesis: Everything in the world does not consist of something that is simple.

3. Thesis: There are causes in the world that are, themselves, free and uncaused. Antithesis: There are no causes in the world that are, themselves, free and uncaused.

4. Thesis: In the series of causes in the world, there is a necessary, uncaused being. Antithesis: In the series of causes in the world, there is not a necessary, uncaused being.

§ 52a. This conflict between thesis and antithesis cannot be resolved dogmatically. Both are supported by proofs. The conflict results when an observer considers a phenomenon (an observed occurrence) to be a thing in itself (an observed occurrence without an observer).

§ 52b. The falsehood of mere Ideas, which cannot be experienced, cannot be discovered by reference to experience. The hidden dialectic of the four natural Ideas of pure reason, however, reveals their false dogmatism. Reason's assertions are based on universally admitted principles while contrary assertions are deduced from other universally acknowledged principles. Contradictory assertions are both false when they are based on a self–contradictory concept. There is no middle between the two false contradictory assertions and therefore nothing is thought by the self–contradictory concept on which they are based.

§ 52c. Experienced objects exist, in the way that they appear, only in experience. They do not exist, in the way that they appear, apart from a spectator's thoughts. In the first two antinomies, both the thesis and the antithesis are false because they are founded on a contradictory concept.

With regard to the first antinomy, I cannot say that the world is infinite or finite. Infinite or finite space and time are mere Ideas and can never be experienced.

With regard to the second antinomy, I cannot say that a body consists of an infinite or a finite number of simple parts. The division, into simple parts, of an experienced body reaches only as far as the possible experience reaches.

§ 53. The first two antinomies were false because they considered an appearance to be a thing–in–itself (a thing as it is apart from being an appearance). In the last two antinomies, due to a misunderstanding, an appearance was mistakenly opposed to a thing–in–itself. The theses are true of the world of things–in–themselves, or the intelligible world. The antitheses are true of the world of appearances, or the phenomenal world.

In the third antinomy, the contradiction is resolved if we realize that natural necessity is a property of things only as mere appearances, while freedom is attributed to things–in–themselves. An action of a rational being has two aspects or states of being: (1) as an appearance, it is an effect of some previous cause and is a cause of some subsequent effect, and (2) as a thing–in–itself it is free or spontaneous. Necessity and freedom can both be predicated of reason. In the world of appearances, motives necessarily cause actions. On the other hand, rational Ideas and maxims, or principles of conduct, command what a reasonable being ought to do. All actions of rational beings, as appearances, are strictly determined by causality. The same actions are free when the rational being acts as a thing–in–itself in accordance with mere practical reason.

The fourth antinomy is solved in the same way as the third. Nowhere in the world of sense experiences and appearances is there an absolutely necessary being. The whole world of sense experiences and appearances, however, is the effect of an absolutely necessary being which can be thought of as a thing–in–itself which is not in the world of appearances.

§ 54. This antinomy or self–conflict of reason results when reason applies its principles to the sensible world. The antinomy cannot be prevented as long as objects (mere appearances) of the sensible world are considered to be things–in–themselves (objects apart from the way that they appear). This exposition of the antinomy will allow the reader to combat the dialectical illusions that result from the nature of pure reason.

III. The Theological Idea

§ 55. This Idea is that of a highest, most perfect, primeval, original Being. From this Idea of pure reason, the possibility and actuality of all other things is determined. The Idea of this Being is conceived in order for all experience to be comprehended in an orderly, united connection. It is, however, a dialectical illusion that results when we assume that the subjective conditions of our thinking are the objective conditions of objects in the world. The theological Idea is an hypothesis that was made in order to satisfy reason. It mistakenly became a dogma.

§ 56. General Remark on the Transcendental Ideas

The psychological, cosmological, and theological Ideas are nothing but pure concepts of reason. They cannot be experienced. All questions about them must be answerable because they are only principles that reason has originated from itself in order to achieve complete and unified understanding of experience. The Idea of a whole of knowledge according to principles gives knowledge a systematic unity. The unity of reason's transcendental Ideas has nothing to do with the object of knowledge. The Ideas are merely for regulative use. If we try to use these Ideas beyond experience, a confusing dialectic results.

=== Conclusion. On the determination of the bounds of pure reason ===
§ 57. We cannot know things in themselves, that is, things as they are apart from being experienced. However, things in themselves may exist and there may be other ways of knowing them, apart from our experience. We must guard against assuming that the limits of our reason are the limits of the possibility of things in themselves. To do this, we must determine the boundary of the use of our reason. We want to know about the soul. We want to know about the size and origin of the world, and whether we have free will. We want to know about a Supreme Being. Our reason must stay within the boundary of appearances but it assumes that there can be knowledge of the things–in–themselves that exist beyond that boundary. Mathematics and natural science stay within the boundary of appearances and have no need to go beyond. The nature of reason is that it wants to go beyond appearances and wants to know the basis of appearances. Reason never stops asking "why?." Reason won't rest until it knows the complete condition for the whole series of conditions. Complete conditions are thought of as being the transcendental Ideas of the immaterial Soul, the whole world, and the Supreme Being. In order to think about these beings of mere thought, we symbolically attribute sensuous properties to them. In this way, the Ideas mark the bounds of human reason. They exist at the boundary because we speak and think about them as if they possess the properties of both appearances and things–in–themselves.

Why is reason predisposed to metaphysical, dialectical inferences? In order to strengthen morality, reason has a tendency to be unsatisfied with physical explanations that relate only to nature and the sensible world. Reason uses Ideas that are beyond the sensible world as analogies of sensible objects. The psychological Idea of the Soul is a deterrent from materialism. The cosmological Ideas of freedom and natural necessity, as well as the magnitude and duration of the world, serve to oppose naturalism, which asserts that mere physical explanations are sufficient. The theological Idea of God frees reason from fatalism.

§ 58. We cannot know the Supreme Being absolutely or as it is in itself. We can know it as it relates to us and to the world. By means of analogy, we can know the relationship between God and us. The relationship can be like the love of a parent for a child, or of a clock–maker for his clock. We know, by analogy, only the relationship, not the unknown things that are related. In this way, we think of the world as if it was made by a Supreme Rational Being.

=== Solution of the general question of the Prolegomena. How is metaphysics possible as a science? ===
Metaphysics, as a natural disposition of reason, is actual. Yet metaphysics itself leads to illusion and dialectical argument. In order for metaphysics to become a science, a critique of pure reason must systematically investigate the role of a priori concepts in understanding. The mere analysis of these concepts does nothing to advance metaphysics as a science. A critique is needed that will show how these concepts relate to sensibility, understanding, and reason. A complete table must be provided, as well as an explanation of how they result in synthetic a priori knowledge. This critique must strictly demarcate the bounds of reason. Reliance on common sense or statements about probability will not lead to a scientific metaphysics. Only a critique of pure reason can show how reason investigates itself and can be the foundation of metaphysics as a complete, universal, and certain science.

=== Appendix ===
==== How to make metaphysics as a science actual ====
An accurate and careful examination of the one existing critique of pure reason is needed. Otherwise, all pretensions to metaphysics must be abandoned. The existing critique of pure reason can be evaluated only after it has been investigated. The reader must ignore for a while the consequences of the critical researches. The critique's researches may be opposed to the reader's metaphysics, but the grounds from which the consequences derive can be examined. Several metaphysical propositions mutually conflict with each other. There is no certain criterion of the truth of these metaphysical propositions. This results in a situation that requires that the present critique of pure reason must be investigated before it can be judged as to its value in making metaphysics an actual science.

==== Pre-judging the Critique of Pure Reason ====
Kant was motivated to write this Prolegomena after reading what he judged to be a shallow and ignorant review of his Critique of Pure Reason. The review was published anonymously in a journal and was written by Garve with many edits and deletions by Feder. Kant's Critique was dismissed as "a system of transcendental or higher idealism." This made it seem as though it was an account of things that exist beyond all experience. Kant, however, insisted that his intent was to restrict his investigation to experience and the knowledge that makes it possible. Among other mistakes, the review claimed that Kant's table and deduction of the categories were "common well–known axioms of logic and ontology, expressed in an idealistic manner." Kant believed that his Critique was a major statement regarding the possibility of metaphysics. He tried to show in the Prolegomena that all writing about metaphysics must stop until his Critique was studied and accepted or else replaced by a better critique. Any future metaphysics that claims to be a science must account for the existence of synthetic a priori propositions and the dialectical antinomies of pure reason.

==== Proposals as to an investigation of the Critique of Pure Reason upon which a judgment may follow ====
Kant proposed that his work be tested in small increments, beginning with the basic assertions. The Prolegomena can be used as a general outline to be compared to the Critique. He was not satisfied with certain parts of the Critique and suggested that the discussions in the Prolegomena be used to clarify those sections. The unsatisfactory parts were the deduction of the categories and the paralogisms of pure reason in the Critique. If the Critique and the Prolegomena are studied and revised by a united effort by thinking people, then metaphysics may finally become scientific. In this way, metaphysical knowledge can be distinguished from false knowledge. Theology will also be benefited because it will become independent of mysticism and dogmatic speculation.

== Reception ==
Schopenhauer, in 1819, declared that the Prolegomena was "the finest and most comprehensible of Kant's principal works, which is far too little read, for it immensely facilitates the study of his philosophy".

Ernst Cassirer asserted that "the Prolegomena inaugurates a new form of truly philosophical popularity, unrivaled for clarity and keenness".

As a teenager, Ernst Mach read and was inspired by the Prolegomena, before later reaching the conclusion that the 'thing-in-itself' was "just an illusion".

Lewis White Beck claimed that the chief interest of the Prolegomena to the student of philosophy is "the way in which it goes beyond and against the views of contemporary positivism". He wrote: "The Prolegomena is, moreover, the best of all introductions to that vast and obscure masterpiece, the Critique of Pure Reason. ... It has an exemplary lucidity and wit, making it unique among Kant's greater works and uniquely suitable as a textbook of the Kantian philosophy."

"Prolegomena to Any Future Metaphysics That Will Be Able to Present Itself as a Science" is the name of a song by John Zorn on the album Prolegomena.

== English Translations ==
Gary Hatfield offers a list and brief assessment of current translations in the introduction to his own translation of the Prolegomena for Cambridge University Press. In total there have been four main original translations:

- John Richardson (London: Simpkin and Marshall, 1819). Described by Hatfield as being "uniformly disparaged".
  - John P. Mahaffy & John H. Bernard (2nd ed., London: Macmillan 1889). This is somewhat of a revision of Richardson's translation.
  - Paul Carus (3rd ed., Open Court, 1912) revised Mahaffy et al.
  - Lewis White Beck (Bobbs-Merrill, 1950) revised Carus' translation.
  - James W. Ellington (Hackett, 1977; 2nd ed., 2001) is an "extensive revision" of the Carus translation. The second edition includes Kant's February 21, 1772 letter to Marcus Herz.
- Ernest Belfort Bax (2nd ed., Bell and Sons, 1891).
- Peter G. Lucas (Manchester University Press, 1953).
  - Günter Zöller (Oxford University Press, 2004) extensively revised Lucas' translation. It contains a large amount of commentary aimed at students, and also contains translations (with commentary) of the Göttingen and Garve reviews. Zöller notes that Lucas' translation was "ahead of its time" in its attitude towards translating Kant consistently, literally, and accurately, and especially in terms of its preservation of Kant's complex syntax.
- Gary Hatfield. A standalone edition in the Cambridge Texts in the History of Philosophy series in 1997 (2nd revised ed., 2004), and in the Cambridge Edition of the Works of Immanual Kant series in the volume Theoretical philosophy after 1781 (Cambridge UP, 2002). The standalaone text is geared more towards a more general audience, containing a longer introduction, extracts from the Critique of Pure Reason, and translations of the Göttingen (Garve-Feder) and Gotha (Schack Hermann Ewald) reviews. The Cambridge Works edition is designed for a more specialist scholarly audience, and has a greater critical apparatus to that effect.
- Jonathan Bennett created a heavily edited and slightly abridged edition as part of his Early Modern Texts project in 2004 (amended 2007). It is designed for ease of reading, especially for beginner students. Bennett does not indicate whether the translation is new one, or a revision of pre-existing one.

== Sources ==
- Kant, Immanuel (1999). Critique of Pure Reason (The Cambridge Edition of the Works of Immanuel Kant). Translated and edited by Paul Guyer and Allen W. Wood. Cambridge University Press. ISBN 978-0-5216-5729-7.
- Kant, Immanuel (2002). Theoretical philosophy after 1781. Cambridge: Cambridge University Press. ISBN 978-0-521-14764-4.
- Kant, Immanuel (2004). Prolegomena to any future metaphysics that will be able to present itself as a science: with two early reviews of the Critique of pure reason. Translated by Peter G. Lucas, edited by Günter Zoller. Oxford; New York: Oxford University Press. ISBN 9780198751519.
