= Anton Wilhelm Tischbein =

German painter (1730-1804)

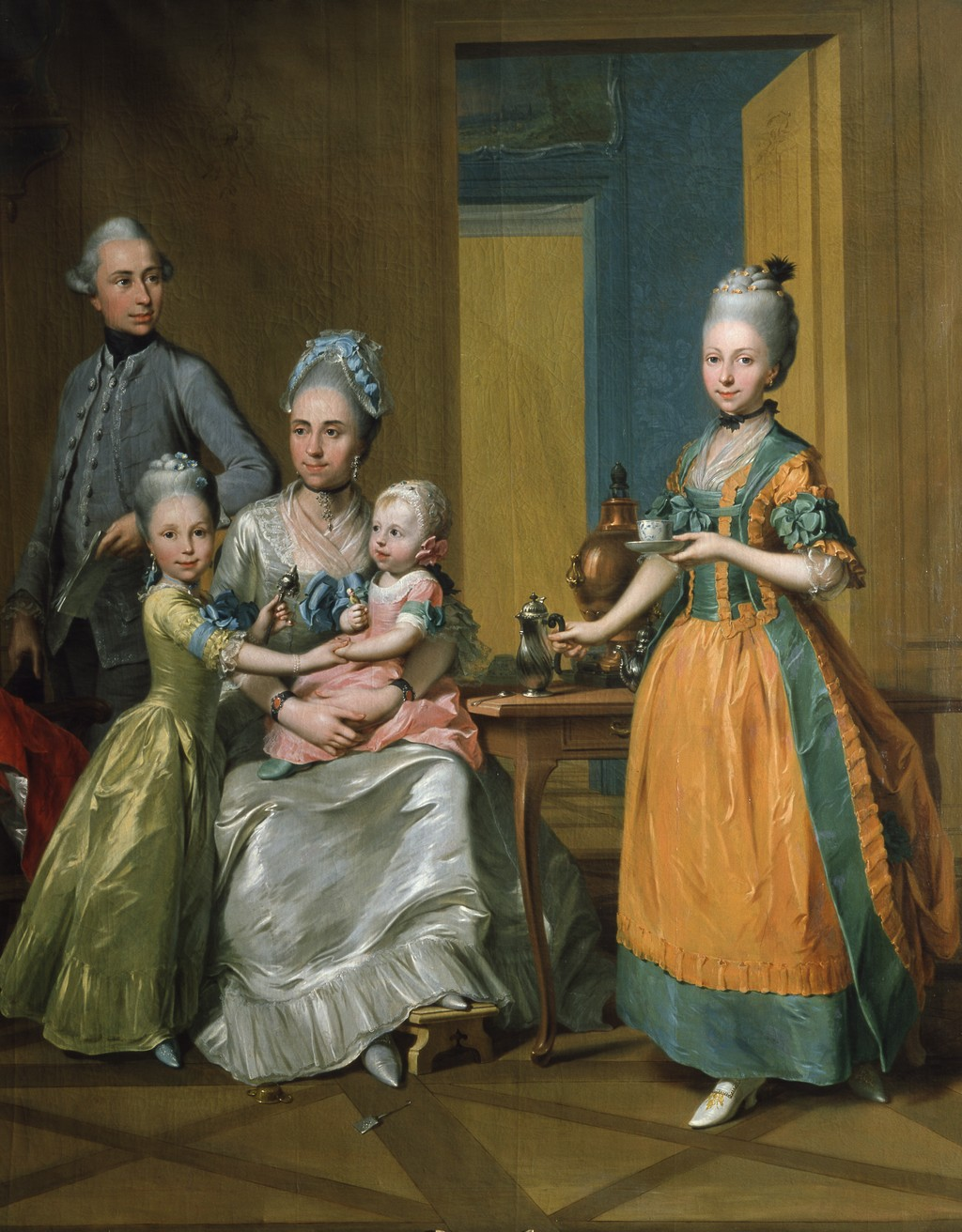
Herr and Frau Borries and Their Children (detail, c.1770/75)

Anton Wilhelm Tischbein, known as the Hanauer Tischbein (1 March 1730, Haina - 1 November 1804, Hanau) was a German painter from the Tischbein family of artists.

== Biography ==
His father was a baker. His four older brothers were all painters, the best-known of them being Johann Heinrich Tischbein. His first teacher was his brother Johann Valentin Tischbein. In 1753, he enrolled at the Royal Academy of Art in The Hague, which had an international reputation for its teaching in the Baroque style.

In 1758, he entered the service of Count Christian August von Solms-Laubach as his secretary. He moved to Hanau in 1769 to become court painter for William I, Elector of Hesse and, after 1772, worked to establish an art academy there and became a teacher.

He worked not only for the nobility, but also for wealthy aristocrats, including Johann Christian Senckenberg, the Brentanos and the La Roches. Portraits were his main work, but he also created historical scenes and small works known as "Kabinettstücke", as well as decorating the Lustschloss at Wilhelmsbad; now a park near Hanau.

== Sources ==
- Anton Merk: Anton Wilhelm Tischbein 1730–1804. (exhibition catalog), Schloss Philippsruhe, Hanau 2004
