= Johann Anton Tischbein =

German painter (1720–1784)

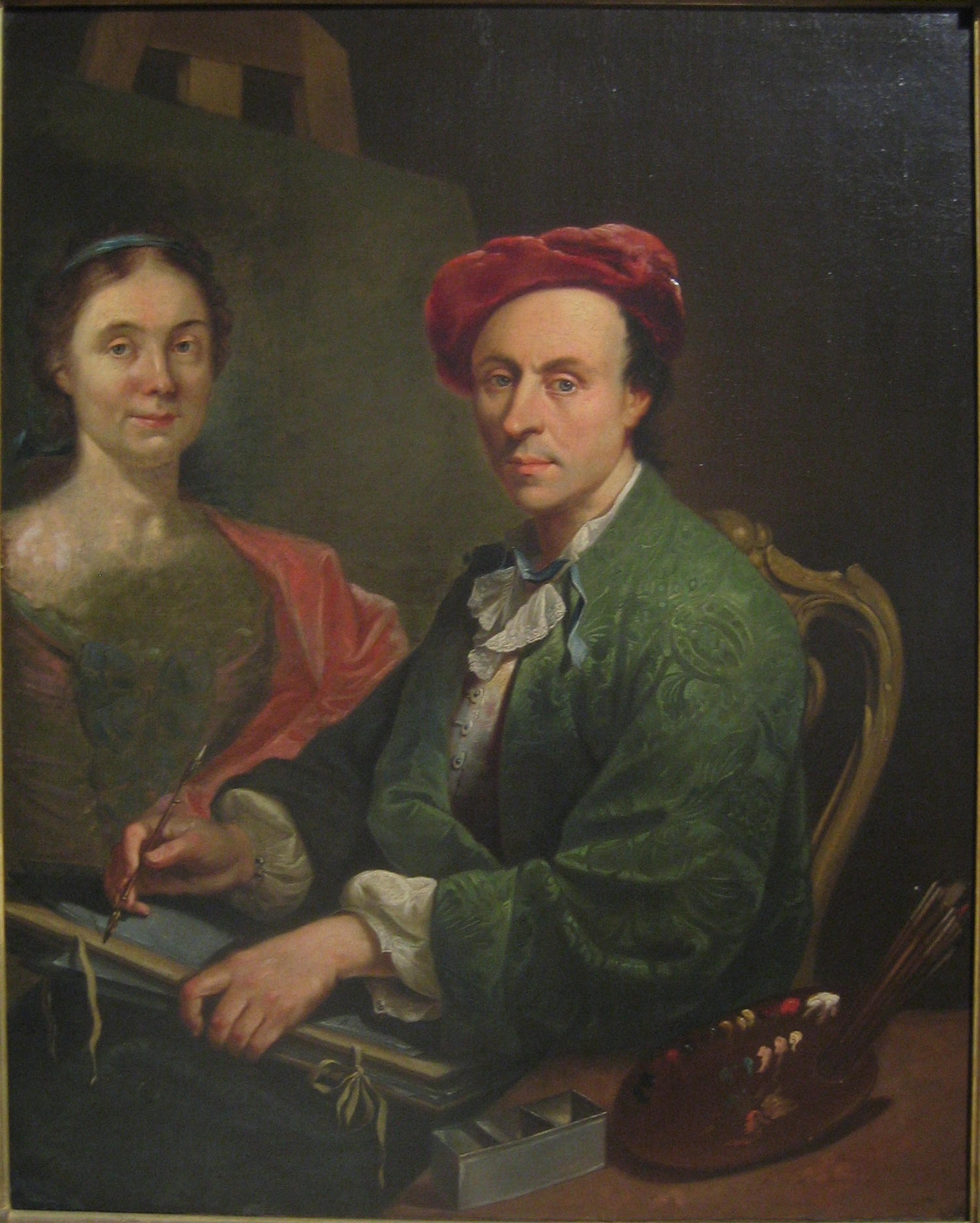
Self-portrait with Easel (c.1760)

Johann Anton Tischbein (28 August 1720 – 26 July 1784) was a German painter and art teacher from the Tischbein family of artist.

== Biography ==
He was born in Haina as the fourth son of the baker, Johann Heinrich Tischbein (1682–1784), five of whose eight children became painters. After a short time at school, he worked as a carpenter in Frankfurt. Later, he went to Paris to learn the art of wallpaper painting, which was very popular among the aristocracy at that time. When his studies were completed, he set up a studio in Frankfurt.

In 1749, he and his brother Johann Heinrich took a study trip to Italy. For many years thereafter, he created oil paintings based on the sketches and watercolors made during that trip.

In 1764, he moved to Hamburg, opened a private art school and was married in 1766. Five years later, he wrote a textbook on painting (Unterricht zu gründlicher Erlernung der Malerey) which, in 1780, earned him a place as an instructor at the Gelehrtenschule des Johanneums. He also painted several murals at Wandsbek Castle, which was demolished in 1861.

He died in 1784 in Hamburg. A street is named after him in the city's Barmbek-Nord district.
