= Tischbein family =

German family

The Tischbein family was a German family of artists, originating in Hesse and spanning three generations. The family patriarch, Johann Heinrich Tischbein (1682–1764), was a master baker at the State Hospital in Haina. The Tischbeins also produced a number of master carpenters. The name "Tischbein" translates to "Table Leg".

Notable members include:

- Anton Wilhelm Tischbein (1730–1804), painter (the Hanauer Tischbein)
- August Albrecht Christian Tischbein (1768–1848), painter and lithographer
- August Anton Tischbein (1805 – after 1867), painter
- Carl Wilhelm Tischbein (1797–1855), painter
- Christian Wilhelm Tischbein (1751–1824), painter, architect and gallery director
- Georg Heinrich Tischbein (1753–1848), etcher, engraver and cartographer
- Johann Anton Tischbein (1720–1784), painter
- Johann Friedrich August Tischbein (1750–1812), painter (the Leipziger Tischbein)
- Johann Heinrich Tischbein (1722–1789), painter (the Kasseler Tischbein)
- Johann Heinrich Tischbein the Younger (1742–1808), painter and engraver
- Johann Heinrich Wilhelm Tischbein (1751–1828), painter (the Goethe Tischbein)
- Johann Jacob Tischbein (1725–1791), painter (the Lübecker Tischbein)
- Johann Valentin Tischbein (1715–1768), painter and set designer
- Ludwig Philipp Tischbein (1744–1806), architect and set designer
- Paul Tischbein (1820–1874), painter

For a complete family tree, see the corresponding article in German Wikipedia.
