= Georg Heinrich Tischbein =

German copperplate engraver

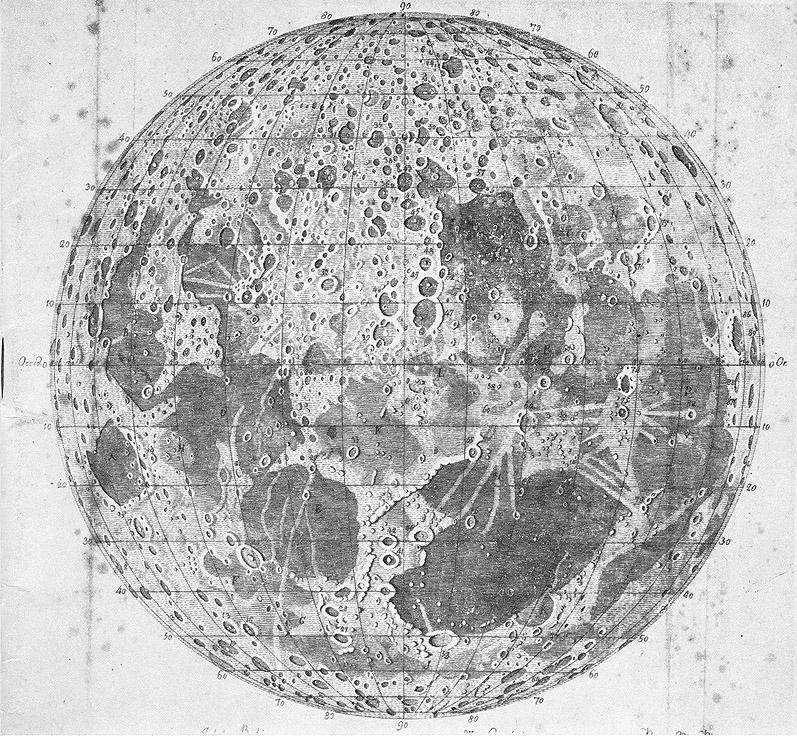
"Tobias Mayers Mondkarte", from the Schrötersche Mondwerk

Georg Heinrich Tischbein (1753/55, Marburg - 4 March 1848, Bremen) was a German engraver, etcher, cartographer and engineer from the Tischbein family of artists.

== Biography ==
His father, Johann (1717-1757), was an engineering professor at the University of Marburg. The painter and set designer, Johann Valentin Tischbein, was his uncle. Christian Wilhelm (1751-1824), his older brother, was a painter, architect and gallery director.

In 1785, he went to Bremen and, from 1789 to 1791, engraved the tables and illustrations for the Schrötersche Mondwerk by Johann Hieronymus Schröter. In 1796, together with the cartographer, Carl Ludwig Murtfeldt, he helped create the Murtfeldtsche Karte; the first map of Bremen produced by using triangulation. In 1804, he did a copper engraved map of the Duchy of Oldenburg, based on drawings by the surveyor, Christoph Friedrich Mentz (1765-1832).

In addition to maps, he produced portraits, cityscapes and landscapes.

== Sources ==
- Herbert Schwarzwälder: Das Große Bremen-Lexikon. Edition Temmen, Bremen 2003 ISBN 3-86108-693-X
