= Johann Friedrich August Tischbein =

German painter (1750–1812)

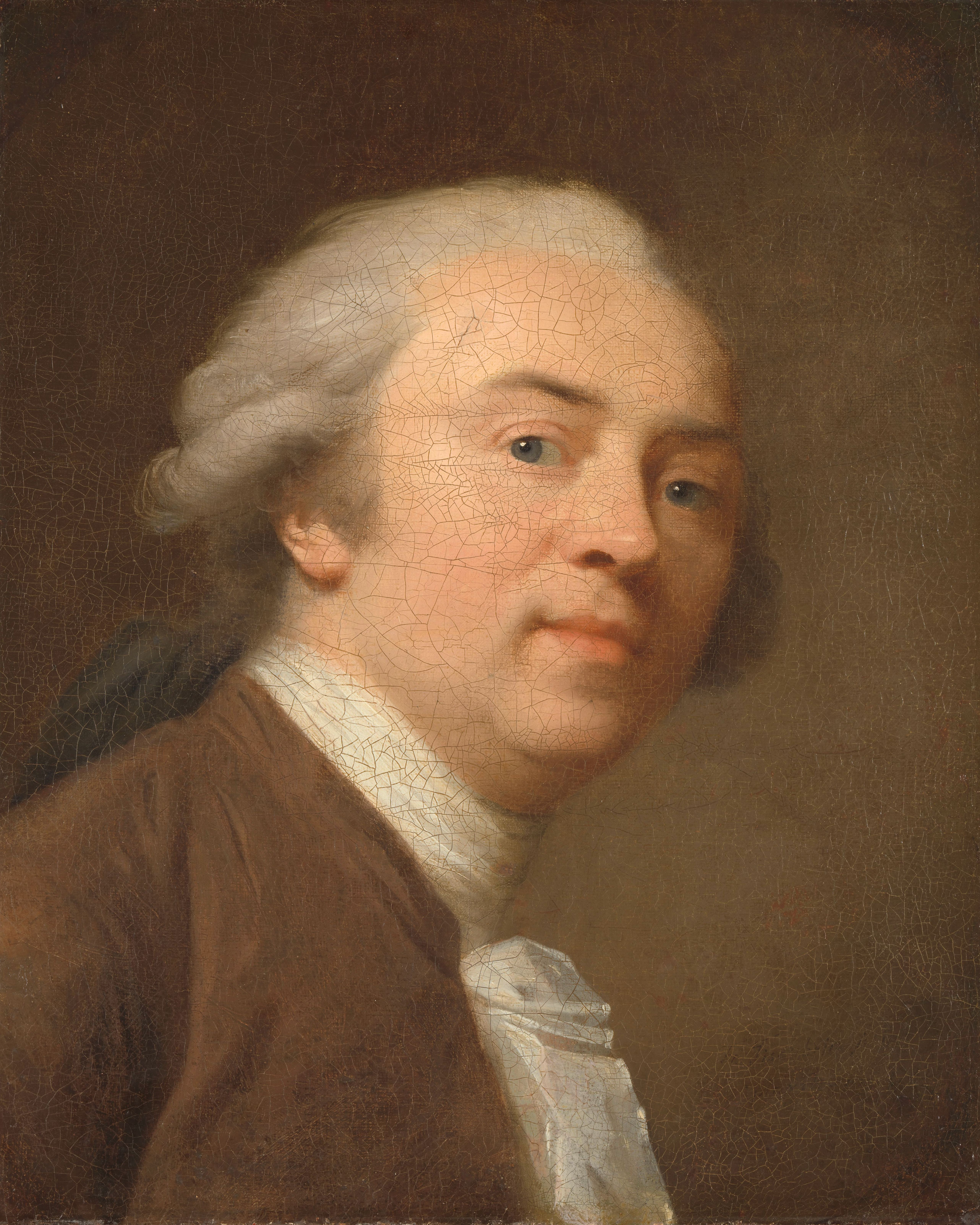
Self-portrait (1782)

Johann Friedrich August Tischbein, known as the Leipziger Tischbein (9 March 1750 – 21 June 1812) was a German portrait painter from the Tischbein family of artists.

== Biography ==
He was born in Maastricht. He received his first lessons from his father, the set painter Johann Valentin Tischbein. In 1768, he went to Kassel to work in the studios of his uncle, Johann Heinrich Tischbein. Four years later, he took a long trip through France, ending in Paris, where he studied with Johann Georg Wille. In 1777, he took a trip to Naples and Rome, where he met and worked with Jacques-Louis David. He returned to Germany in 1780.

That same year, he was appointed court painter to Friedrich Karl August, Prince of Waldeck and Pyrmont in Bad Arolsen and was later named "Council and Cabinet Painter". During the 1780s he made three trips to the Netherlands, on behalf of his patron, where he improved his skills in portrait painting.

In 1795, he was hired by Leopold III, Duke of Anhalt-Dessau but, by this time, noble patronage was no longer the necessity it once was so, only one year later, Tischbein went to Berlin and became a successful independent portrait painter. In 1799, he had even greater success in Dresden. The following year, he received an appointment to replace Adam Friedrich Oeser as Director of the Academy of Visual Arts in Leipzig.

In 1806, he went to Saint Petersburg to settle the estate of his brother, the architect and set designer, Ludwig Philipp Tischbein (1744–1806). He remained there for three years to finish several lucrative commissions from the Russian aristocracy.

His daughter, Caroline (1783–1843) and son Carl Wilhelm (1797–1855) also became artists.

Tischbein died on 21 June 1812, in Heidelberg.

== Selected portraits ==
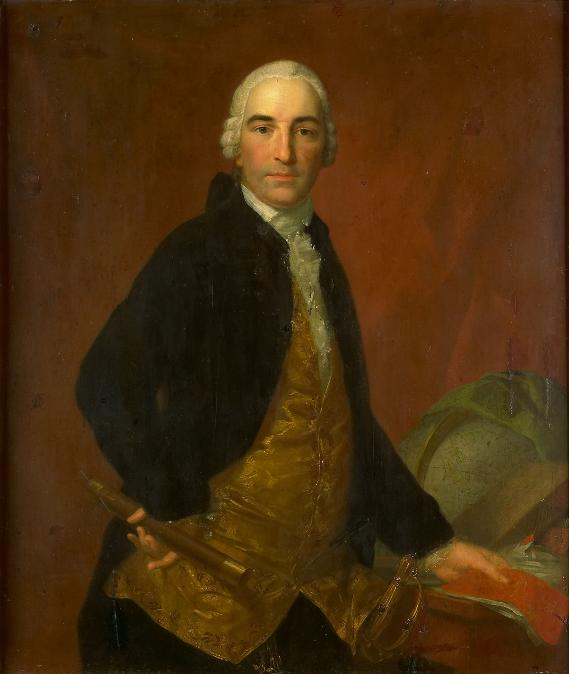
Willem Arnold Alting

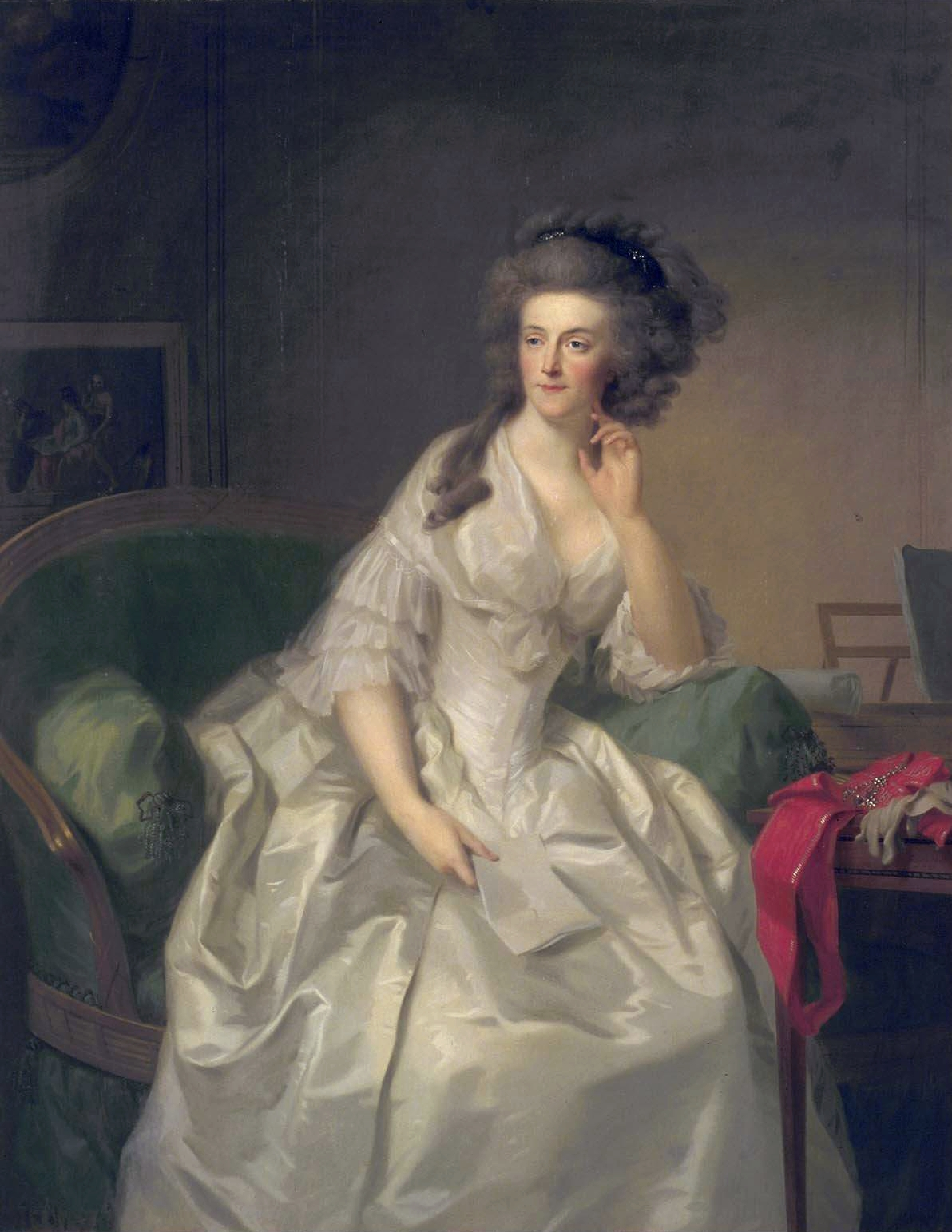
Wilhelmina of Prussia, Princess of Orange

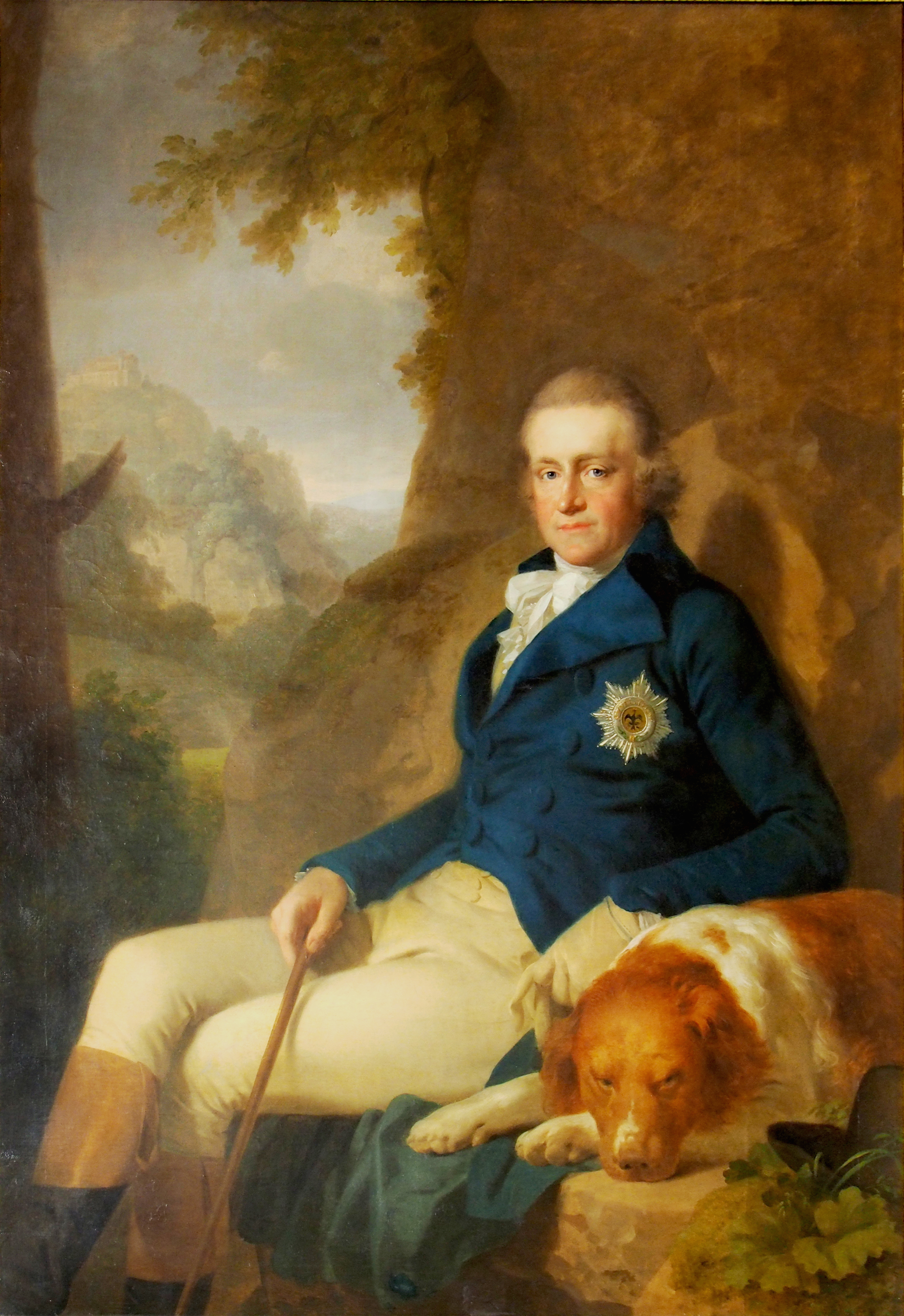
Karl August, Grand Duke of Saxe-Weimar-Eisenach

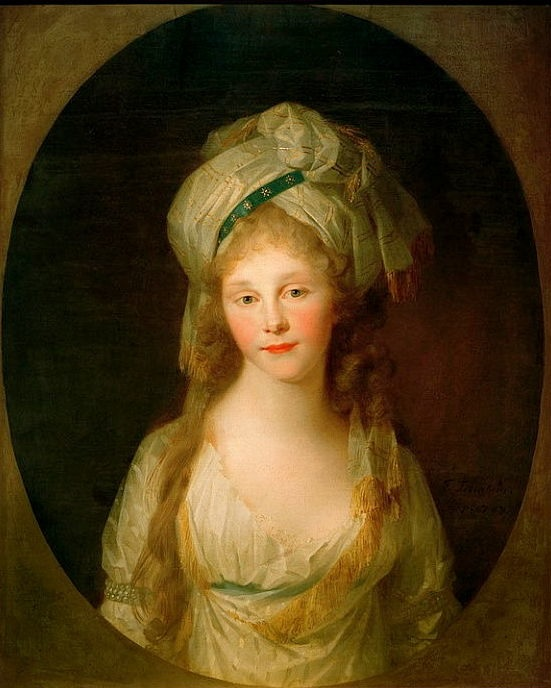
Frederica of Mecklenburg-Strelitz with Turban, 1796–97

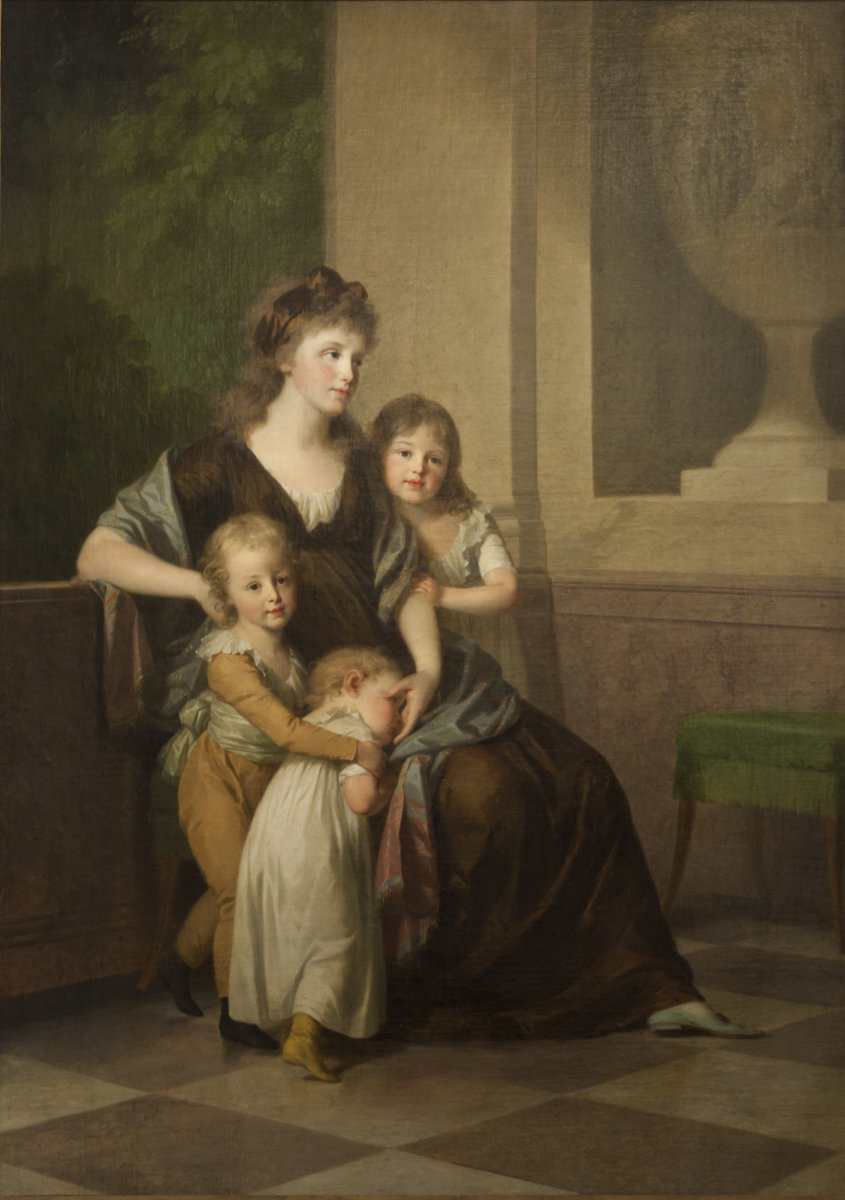
Christiane Amalie of Anhalt-Dessau, 1797–98

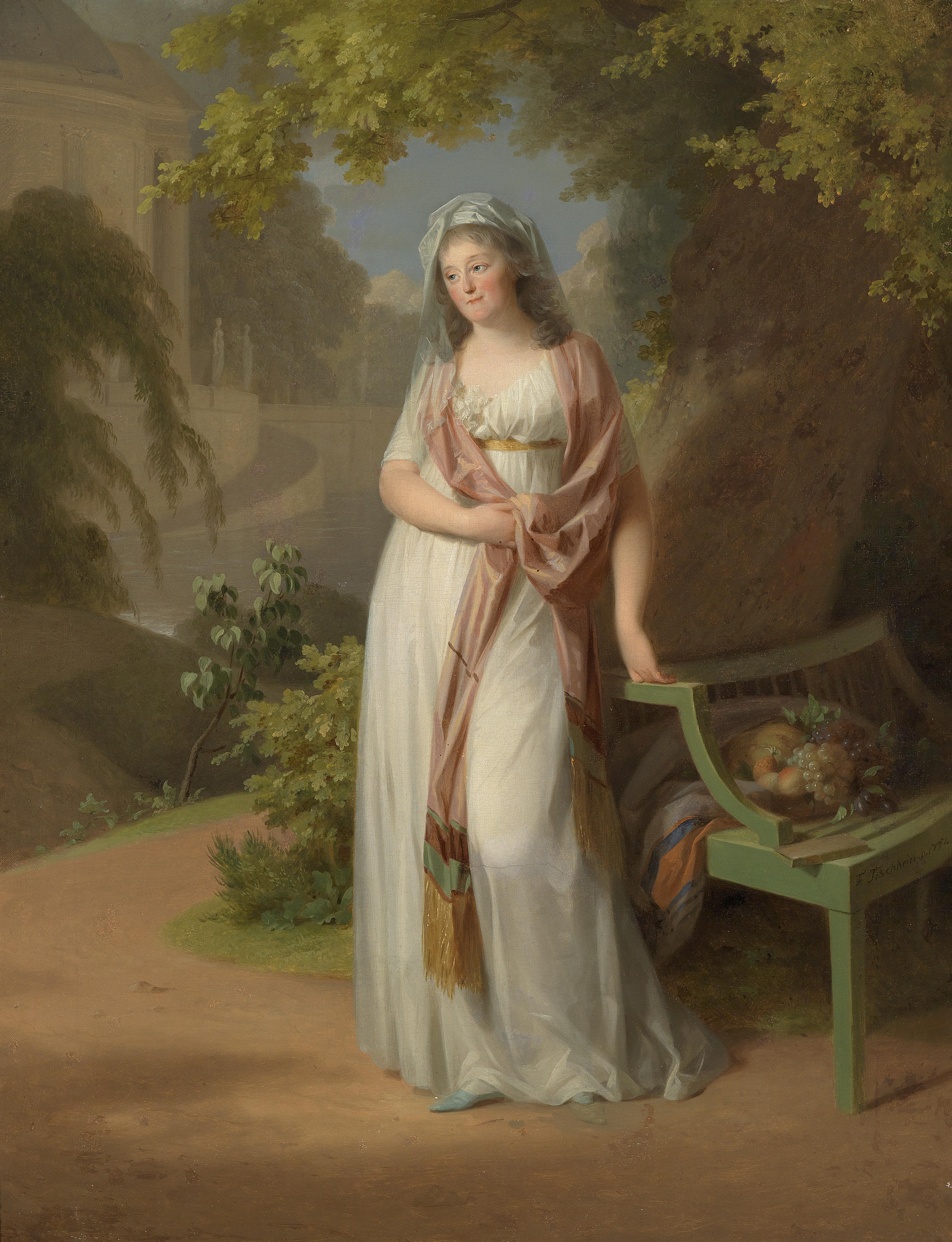
Margravine Louise of Brandenburg-Schwedt

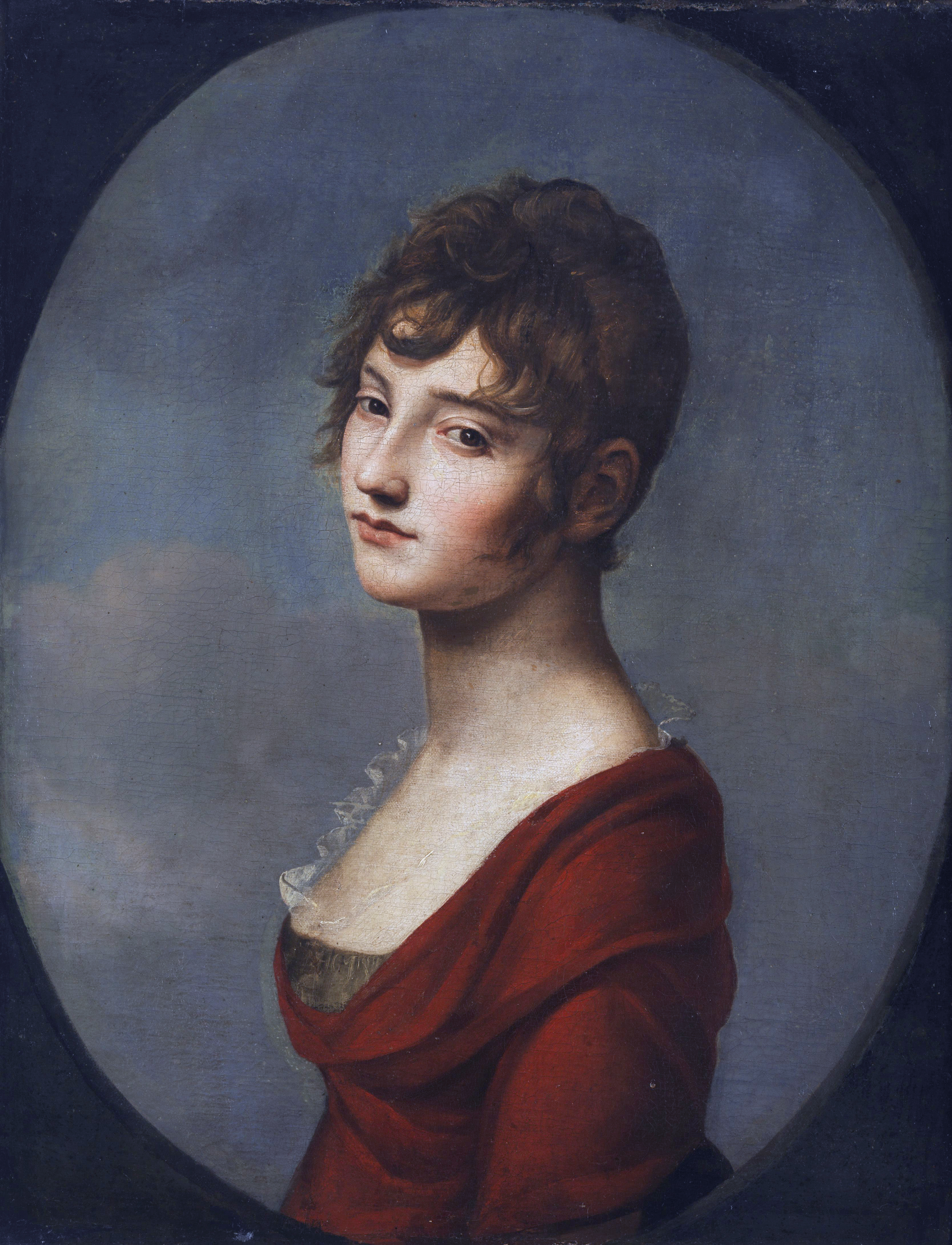
Amalie Wolff-Malcolmi
