= Amalie Wolff-Malcolmi =

German tragic actress

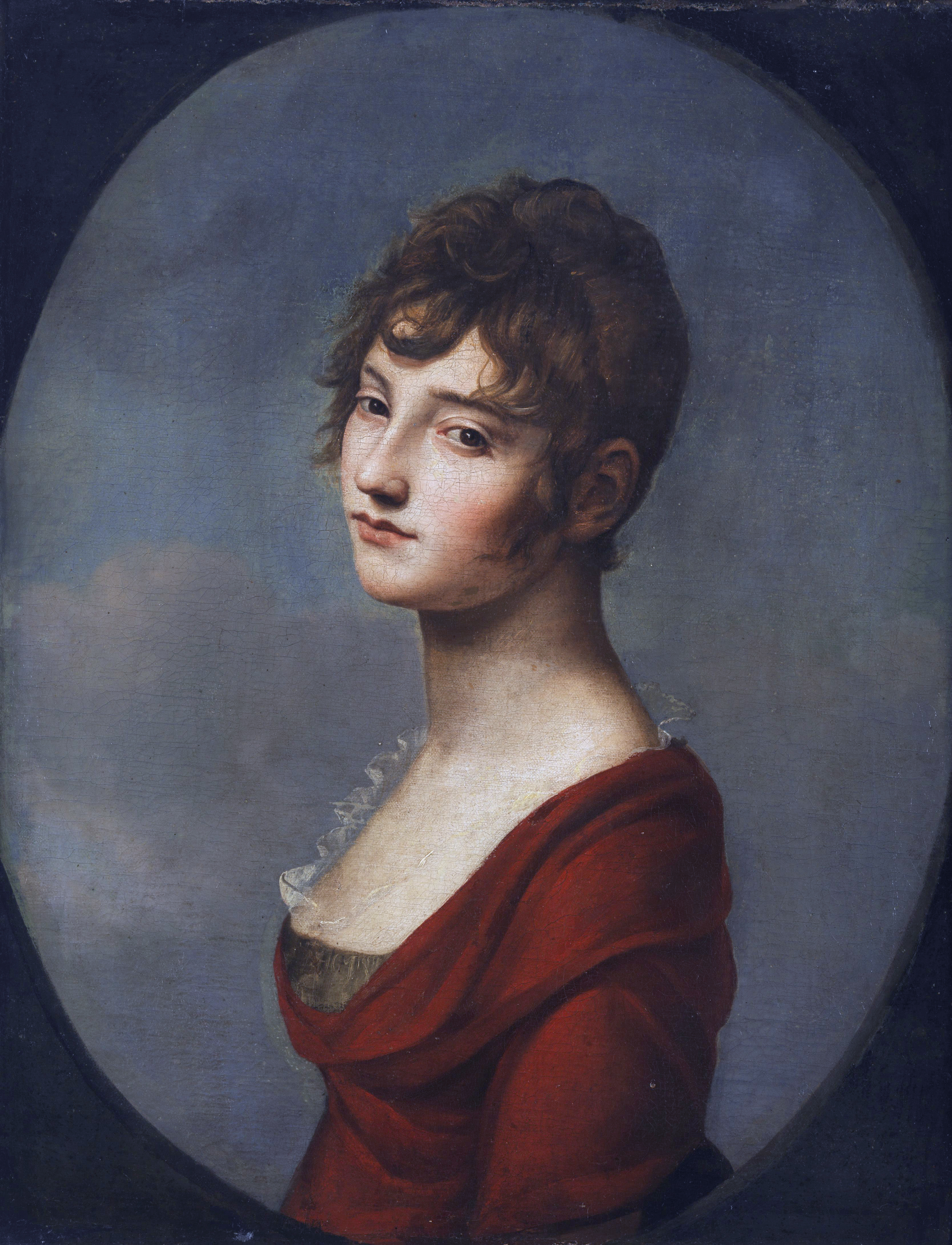
Portrait of Amalie Wolff-Malcolmi by Johann Friedrich August Tischbein

German tragic actress Amalie Wolff-Malcolmi (11 December 1780/1– 18 August 1851) had an almost three-decade tenure at the Royal Theatre in Berlin from 1816 to 1844. She is also the subject of the portrait "Amalie Wolff-Malcolmi" by the painter Johann Friedrich August Tischbein.

== Career ==
Wolff-Malcolmi was trained in acting in Weimar until April 1816, when she joined the Royal Theatre in Berlin. She performed at the Royal Theatre until September 1844, when she retired due to failing eyesight.

== Private life ==
Wolff-Malcolmi was born on 11 December 1780 or 1781 in Leipzig, Germany. Her father was the actor and composer Carl Friedrich Malcolmi. Wolff-Malcolmi married Heinrich Becker on 7 October 1803, though the couple divorced the following year. On 26 December 1804, Wolff-Malcolmi married Pius Alexander Wolff, who also worked at the Royal Theatre in Berlin.

Wolf-Malcolmi died in Berlin on 18 August 1851.
