= Johann Jacob Tischbein =

German painter (1725–1791)

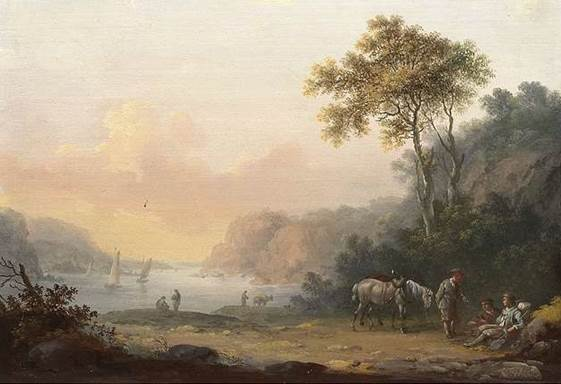
Riverview at Sunset (1773)

Johann Jacob Tischbein, known as the Lübecker Tischbein (21 February 1725, Haina – 22/23 August 1791, Lübeck), was a German painter from the Tischbein family of artists.

== Biography ==
He was the sixth son of Johann Heinrich Tischbein (1682-1764), a baker at the local hospital. He was originally a decorative painter, but eventually began producing portraits and landscapes. His wife was a daughter of the painter, Johann Dietrich Lilly (1705-1792). After spending several years in Hamburg, he relocated to Lübeck in 1775.

One of his most prominent students was his nephew, Johann Heinrich Wilhelm Tischbein, known as the "Goethe-Tischbein". His son, August Albrecht Christian Tischbein, was also a painter and lithographer.
