= Johann Heinrich Tischbein the Younger =

German painter (1742–1808)

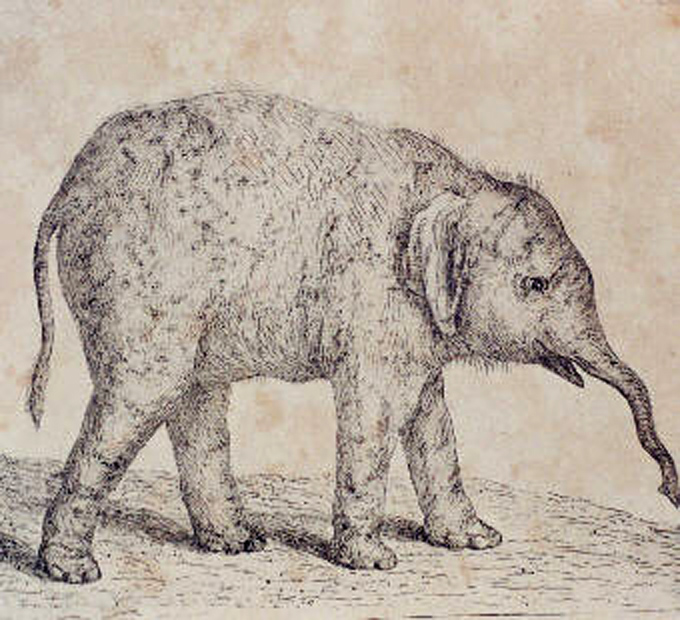
The "Goethe-Elefant" (1778/80)

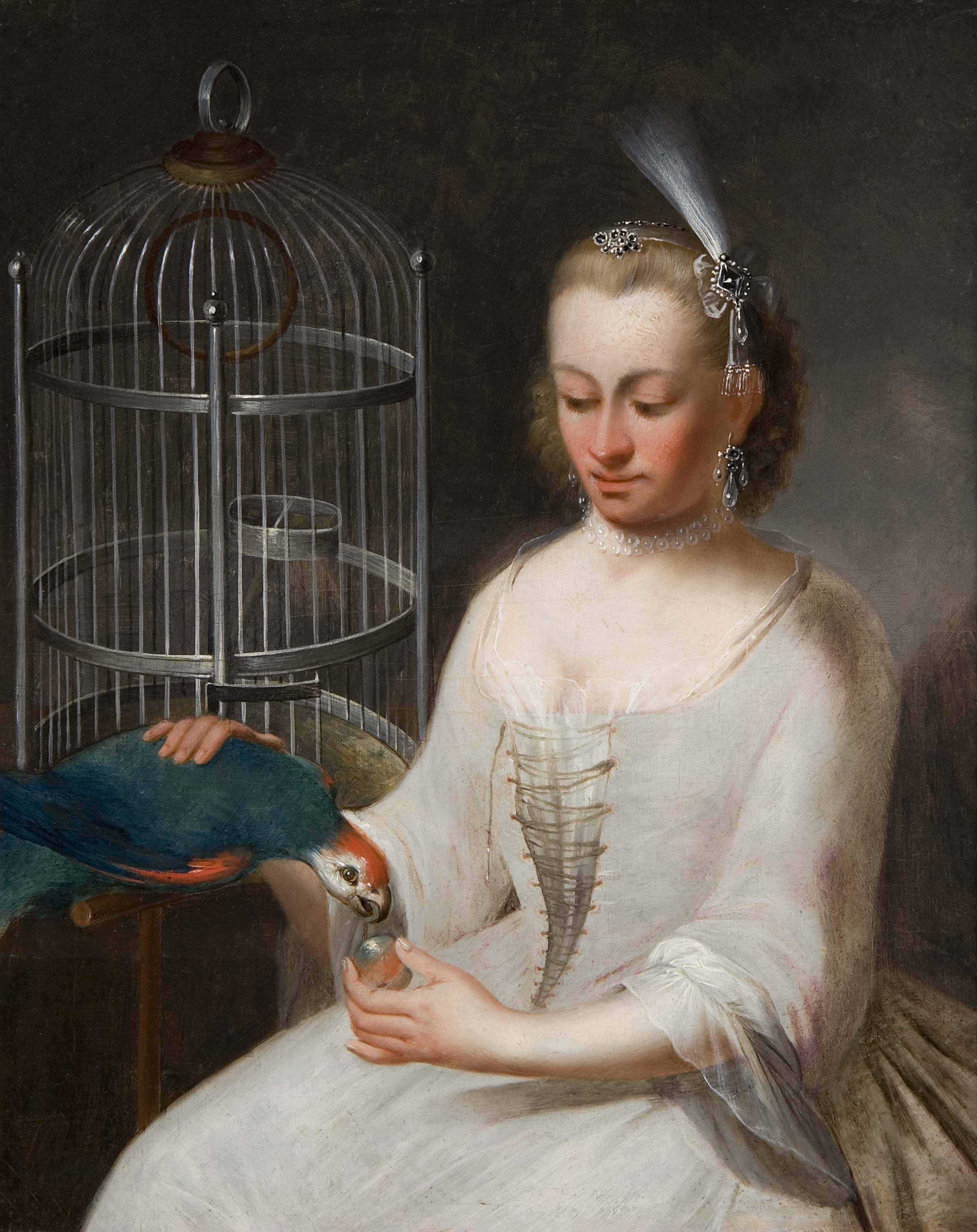
Woman with Parrot

Johann Heinrich Tischbein, known as The Younger (28 November 1751, Haina - 22 December 1829, Eutin) was a German painter and engraver from the Tischbein family of artists.

== Biography ==
He was the son of Johann Konrad Tischbein (1712–1778), a carpenter who was the eldest son of the Tischbein family patriarch, Johann Heinrich (1682-1764). His younger brother was Johann Heinrich Wilhelm Tischbein, known as the Goethe Tischbein. He received his first art lessons from his uncle Johann Heinrich Tischbein, sometimes called The Elder to distinguish them.

After spending some time in the Netherlands, he settled in Kassel, where his uncle had established an art gallery for William VIII, Landgrave of Hesse-Kassel. In 1775, he was appointed "Inspector" of the gallery. After 1801, he took custody of his late sister Johanna's son, Franz Pforr, seeing to his education and gaining him admission to the Academy of Fine Arts, Vienna.

His work included portraits; notably one of the poet, Gottfried August Bürger (1771), as well as landscapes and animal paintings. He is, however, especially remembered for his engravings and etchings. In 1790, he published the Kurtzgefaßte Abhandlung über die Aetzkunst (Brief Treatise on Etching), with 84 plates. One of his best-known etchings is that of the so-called "Goethe-Elefant", a popular Indian elephant in the Landgrave's menagerie whose skull was examined and sketched by Goethe following its untimely accidental death from a fall.

== Sources ==
- Louis Katzenstein (1894). "Tischbein, Johann Heinrich" . Allgemeine Deutsche Biographie (in German). Vol. 38. Leipzig: Duncker & Humblot. pp. 362–371.
