= Johann Georg Heinrich Feder =

German philosopher (1740–1821)

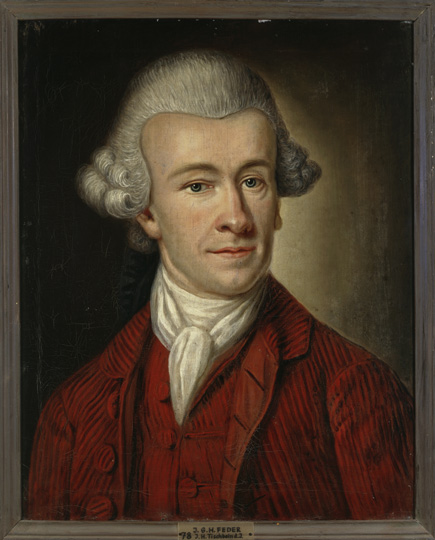
Johann Georg Heinrich Feder, painting by Johann Heinrich Tischbein the Younger, c. 1772

Johann Georg Heinrich Feder (German: [ˈfeːdɐ]; 15 May 1740 – 22 May 1821) was a German philosopher.

== Life ==
Feder was born on 15 May 1740 in the village of Schornweisach (now part of Uehlfeld, Bavaria) in the Principality of Bayreuth, the son of Martin Heinrich Feder (died 1749), the village pastor. Feder studied theology and pedagogy at the University of Erlangen. From 1768 to 1782 he was Professor of Philosophy at the University of Göttingen. At the time of his death, in Hanover, he was Director of the Pageninstitut (a courtly educational institution for pages).

His writings were widely read at the time due to their clear and tasteful mode of presentation. Feder decisively countered Immanuel Kant's idealism. He gained notoriety through his abbreviation of Christian Garve's review of Kant's Critique of Pure Reason. As philosopher Feder belonged to the better representatives of the eclectics tending towards the Leibniz–Wolff School.

== Works ==
- Sex dies, intra quos opus creationis absolutum, quales fuerint (1759).
- Homo natura non ferus (1765).
- Grundriss der philosophischen Wissenschaften (1767). 2nd ed., 1769.
- Vom Werthe des systematischen Denkens (1767).
- Der neue Emil (1768–1774). 2 volumes.
  - Volume 1, 1768. 2nd ed., 1771. 3rd ed., 1774.
  - Volume 2, 1774.
- Logik und Metaphysik im Grundriss (1769). 3rd ed., 1783. Google (UMich)
- Lehrbuch der praktischen Philosophie (1770).
- Institutiones logicae et metaphysicae (1777).
- Untersuchungen über den menschlichen Willen (1779–1793). 4 volumes.
  - Volume 1, 1779.
  - Volume 2, 1782.
  - Volume 3, 1786.
  - Volume 4, 1793.
- Grundlehren zur Kenntniß des menschlichen Willens (1783). 2nd ed., 1785. Google (Lausanne)
- Ueber Raum und Causalität, zur Prüfung der kantischen Philosophie (1787).
- (ed.) Philosophische Bibliothek (1788–1791). 4 volumes.
- Grundsätze der Logik und Metaphysik (1794).
- Sophie Churfürstin von Hannover im Umriss (1810).
- Handbuch über das Staats- Rechnungs- und Kassen-Wesen (1820). Google (UMich)
- Feders Leben, Natur und Grundsätze (1825). [Feder's autobiography, edited by his son Karl August Ludwig]
