= Christian Garve =

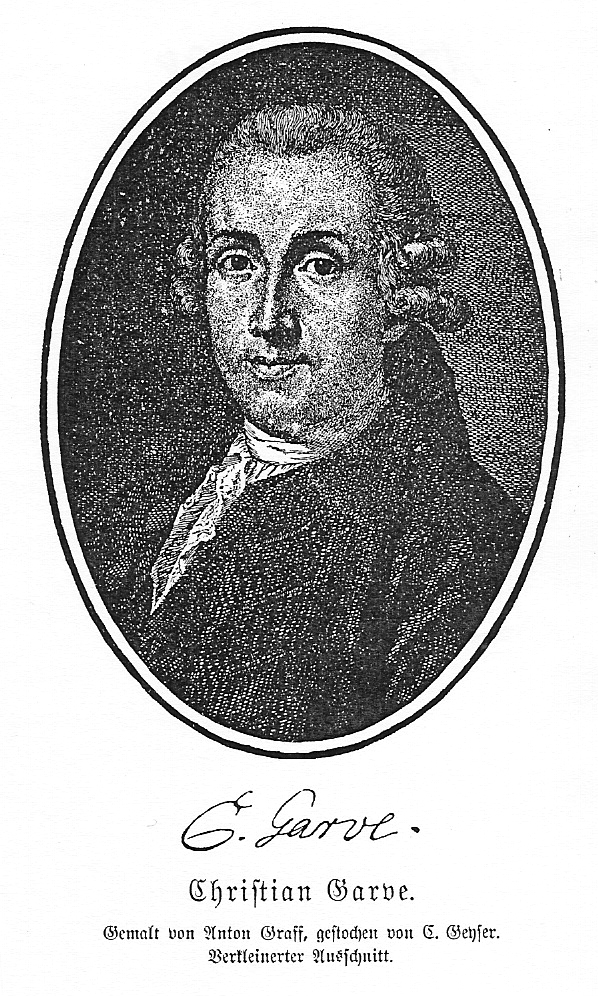
- Born: 7 January 1742; Breslau, Habsburg Silesia, Bohemian Crown, Holy Roman Empire (now Wrocław, Poland)
- Died: 1 December 1798 (aged 56); Breslau, Kingdom of Prussia, Holy Roman Empire

Education
- Education: University of Frankfurt (Oder); University of Halle
- Academic advisor: Alexander Gottlieb Baumgarten

Philosophical work
- Era: 18th-century philosophy
- Region: Western philosophy
- School: Age of Enlightenment
- Institutions: University of Leipzig
- Main interests: Moral philosophy
- Notable ideas: Popular philosophy

Christian Garve (German: [ˈɡaʁvə]; 7 January 1742 – 1 December 1798) was one of the best-known philosophers of the late Enlightenment along with Immanuel Kant and Moses Mendelssohn.

== Life ==
Christian Garve was born into a family of manual workers and died aged 56 in his parental home. He studied in Frankfurt an der Oder and Halle (Saale). In 1766 he gained his master's degree in philosophy. From 1770 until 1772 he was extraordinary professor of mathematics and logic in Leipzig. He retired to Breslau in 1772 due to bad health, where he was active as a bookseller. The greatest part of his life was however spent staying with his mother in Breslau. In this city he also became a member of the Masonic Lodge "Friedrich zum goldenen Zepter" ("Frederick of the Golden Scepter").

Garve became well-known particularly for his intensive activity as a translator (producing versions of, e.g., Cicero's De Officiis (1783) and Adam Smith's Wealth of Nations). His translation of Cicero's work was done at the request of Frederick II, who bestowed upon him a pension of 200 thalers. Garve eulogized Frederick in the Fragmente zur Schilderung des Geistes, Charakters and der Regierung Friedrichs II. (1798).

He composed psychological, moral and economic texts and reviews for the Neue Bibliothek der schönen Wissenschaften und der freyen Künste ("New Library of the Beautiful Sciences and Free Arts"). He was strongly marked by the influence of the English and Scottish Enlightenment as well as Stoic ethics. He never formulated his essentially empirical philosophy in terms of a system, publishing his thought in the form of remarks and essays. As a result, he was reproached for being merely a shallow Popularphilosoph (popular philosopher), a reputation he has retained, and his writings did much toward the popularization of philosophy in Germany.

Of interest is his engagement with Immanuel Kant, which was initiated by a review of Kant's Critique of Pure Reason in the Göttingische Gelehrte Anzeigen ("Göttingen Learned Advertiser") which had been shortened by the Göttingen philosopher Johann Georg Heinrich Feder. Kant felt himself to have been misunderstood, and complained bitterly about the review in the Appendix to his Prolegomena to Any Future Metaphysics that Will Henceforth Come Forward as a Science. When the original, longer review was published by Garve in the Allgemeine Deutsche Bibliothek ("General German Library"), it still attracted Kant's censure. Kant consequently wrote his own Anti-Garve. This program in time expanded into Kant's Groundwork of the Metaphysics of Morals. The intellectual engagement between Kant and Garve extended up to Garve's death of cancer in 1798.

== Works ==
- Gesammelte Werke, ed. K. Wölfel, 16 vols. completed, 1985–1999.

=== Works translated by Garve ===
- Edmund Burke, Über den Ursprung unserer Begriffe vom Erhabenen und Schönen [A Philosophical Enquiry into the Origin of Our Ideas of the Sublime and Beautiful], Riga, 1773
- Adam Smith, Untersuchung über die Natur und die Ursachen des Nationalreichthums [The Wealth of Nations], Breslau [u.a.] : Korn 1799
- Adam Ferguson, Grundsätze der Moralphilosophie [Institutes of Moral Philosophy], Leipzig 1772
- Aristotle, Ἠθικά [Ethics] (1798-1801)
- Aristotle, Πολιτικά [Politics] (1799-1802)
