= Johann Valentin Tischbein =

German painter (1715-1768)

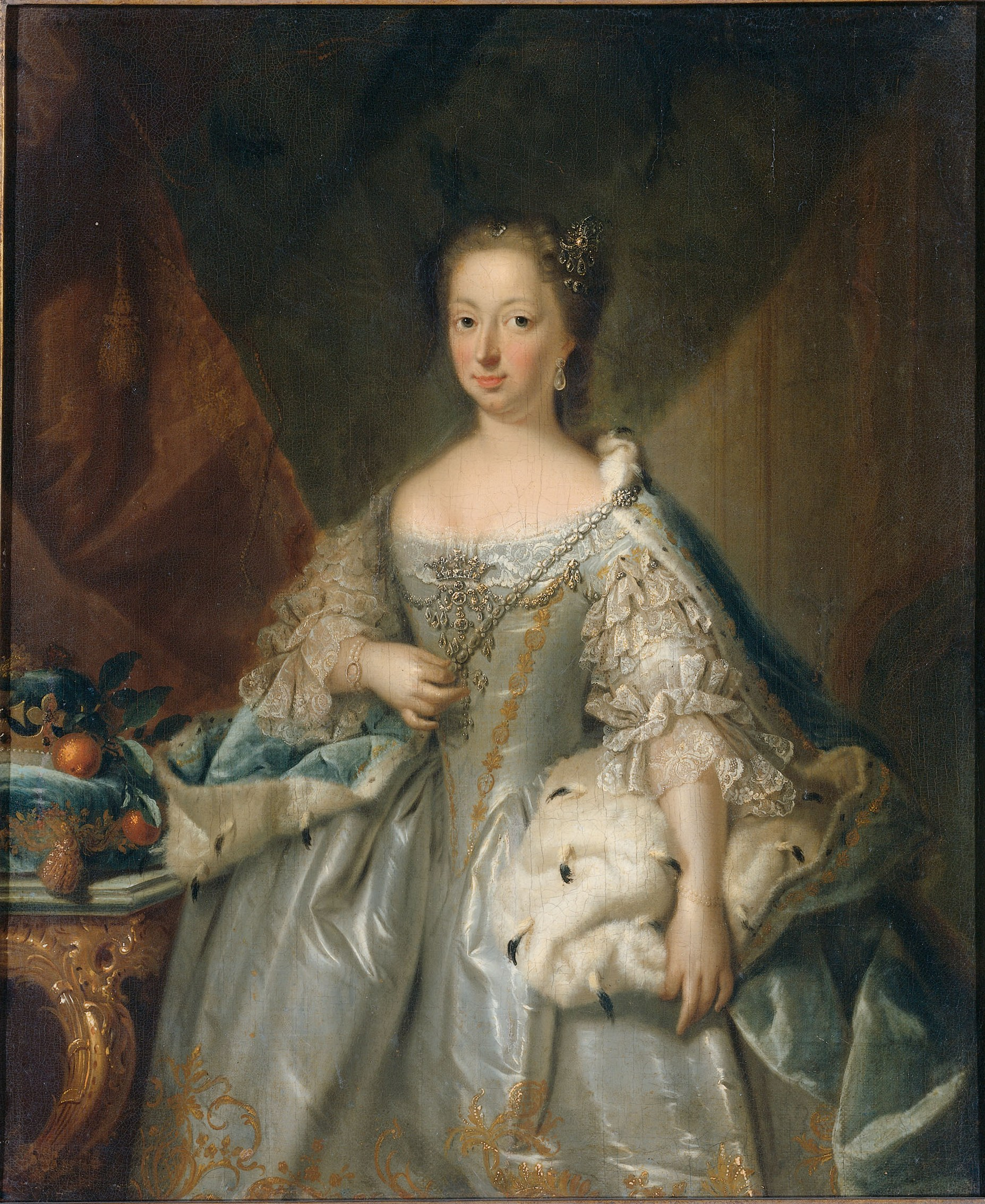
Anne of Hanover

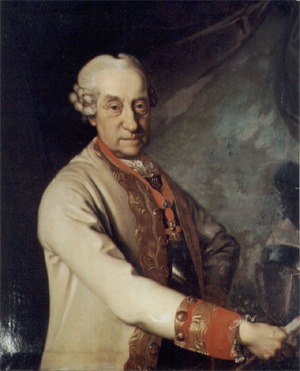
Prince Joseph of Saxe-Hildburghausen

Johann Valentin Tischbein (11 December 1715 – 24 April 1768) was a German painter from the Tischbein family of artists.

== Biography ==
He was born in Haina. His father, Johann Heinrich Tischbein (1682–1764) was a baker; five of whose eight children became painters. From 1729 to 1736, he studied art; first in Darmstadt with the court painter Johann Christian Fiedler, then in Kassel with the portrait painter, Johann Georg von Freese (1701–1775).

His whereabouts for the next three years is uncertain, although he appears to have spent some time in Frankfurt am Main. In 1739 he worked for the House of Solms and was appointed court painter in 1741. From 1744 to c.1747, he served as court painter to the Hohenlohes in Kirchberg an der Jagst, where he was married. His next known location was Maastricht, where he had a commission from Hobbe Esaias van Aylva, the military Governor, to create a series of nine (mostly posthumous) portraits of his predecessors (currently on display at the Schloss Fasanerie in Fulda). It was there that his son, Johann Friedrich August Tischbein was born. Shortly after, he and his family moved to The Hague and Amsterdam.

He returned to Germany in 1764 and became a theater painter for the Landgraviate of Hesse-Darmstadt. His first wife died sometime during this period and he remarried in 1765. Later, he worked as court painter for Ernest Frederick III, Duke of Saxe-Hildburghausen, although he continued to do occasional work for the Landgraviate.

He died in 1768, in Hildburghausen.

== Sources ==
- Biographical notes @ Hessian Biography
- Gemäldegalerie Alte Meister, Kassel
- Servé Minis, De terugkeer van de gouverneurs. De gouverneursportretten uit het Jachtslot Fasanerie te Fulda, Bonnefanten, 1998 ISBN 90-7163-019-6
