= Haina =

- Municipality
- Coat of arms

- Location of Haina within Waldeck-Frankenberg district
- Interactive map of Haina
- Location within Germany Location within Hesse
- Coordinates: 51°02′N 08°58′E
- Country: Germany
- State: Hesse
- Admin. region: Kassel
- District: Waldeck-Frankenberg

Government
  - Mayor (2023–29): Alexander Köhler (SPD)

Area
  - Total: 91.22 km^{2} (35.22 sq mi)
- Elevation: 337 m (1,106 ft)

Population (2025-12-31)
  - Total: 3,256
  - Density: 35.69/km^{2} (92.45/sq mi)
- Time zone: UTC+01:00 (CET)
  - Summer (DST): UTC+02:00 (CEST)
- Postal codes: 35114
- Dialling codes: 06456
- Vehicle registration: KB
- Website: www.haina.de

Haina (Kloster) (German pronunciation: [ˈhaɪna]) is a municipality in Waldeck-Frankenberg in northwest Hesse, Germany.

== Geography ==
=== Location ===
Haina lies in Waldeck-Frankenberg south of Frankenberg and east of Burgwald at the southwest slope of the Kellerwald range. It lies on the river Wohra not far west of the Hohes Lohr (the Kellerwald range's second highest peak at 657 m).

=== Neighbouring municipalities ===
Haina borders in the northwest on the town of Frankenau, in the northeast on the town of Bad Wildungen (both in Waldeck-Frankenberg), in the east on the municipality of Bad Zwesten, in the southeast on the municipalities of Jesberg and Gilserberg (all three in the Schwalm-Eder-Kreis), in the south on the town of Gemünden, and in the west on the municipality of Burgwald and the town of Frankenberg (all three in Waldeck-Frankenberg).

=== Constituent municipalities ===
Haina consists of the following 12 centres: Altenhaina, Battenhausen, Bockendorf, Dodenhausen, Haddenberg, Haina (administrative seat), Halgehausen, Hüttenrode, Löhlbach, Mohnhausen, Oberholzhausen and Römershausen.

== History ==
The former Cistercian monastery in Haina is Hesse's most important Gothic building works. Haina Monastery was built by monks from the Altenberg Monastery in the Bergisches Land. In 1188, they had moved to the Aulesburg (castle) near Löhlbach, and thirty years later they moved again, this time to Haina.

Through donations, buying and exchanges, the Haina Cistercians earned themselves a rich estate, from the Weser all the way to the Main. In 1527, the monastery was shut down by Philip I, Landgrave of Hesse – known as Philip the Magnanimous – and turned into a state hospital.

The Monastery Church, built between 1215 and 1330, is the earliest Gothic building in Germany. The former monastery nowadays houses a psychiatric hospital.

In 1789, the Abbot of the Haina Monastery Friedrich von Stamford built the Stamfordscher Garten in Haina, creating the landscaped style of an "English garden".

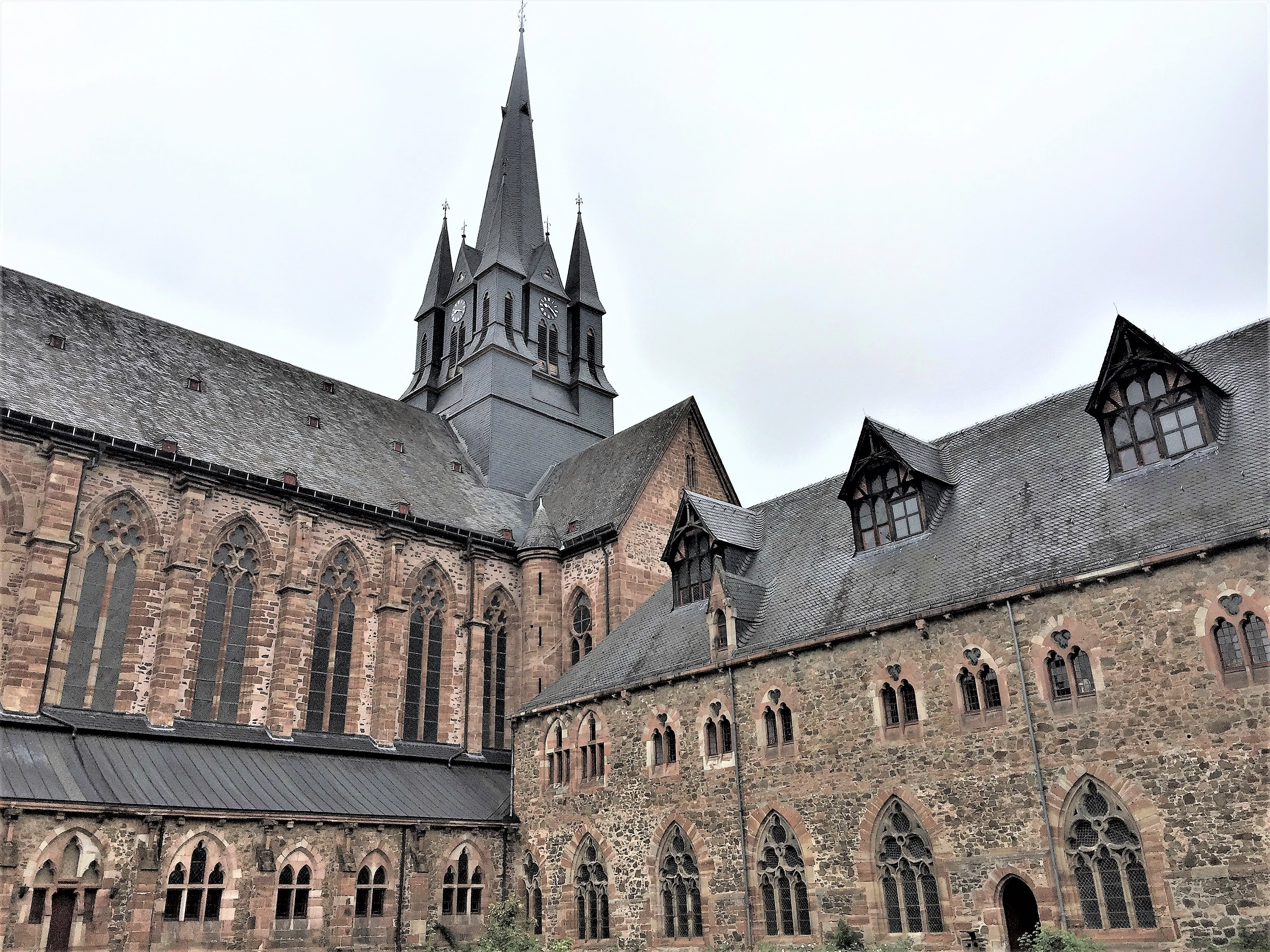

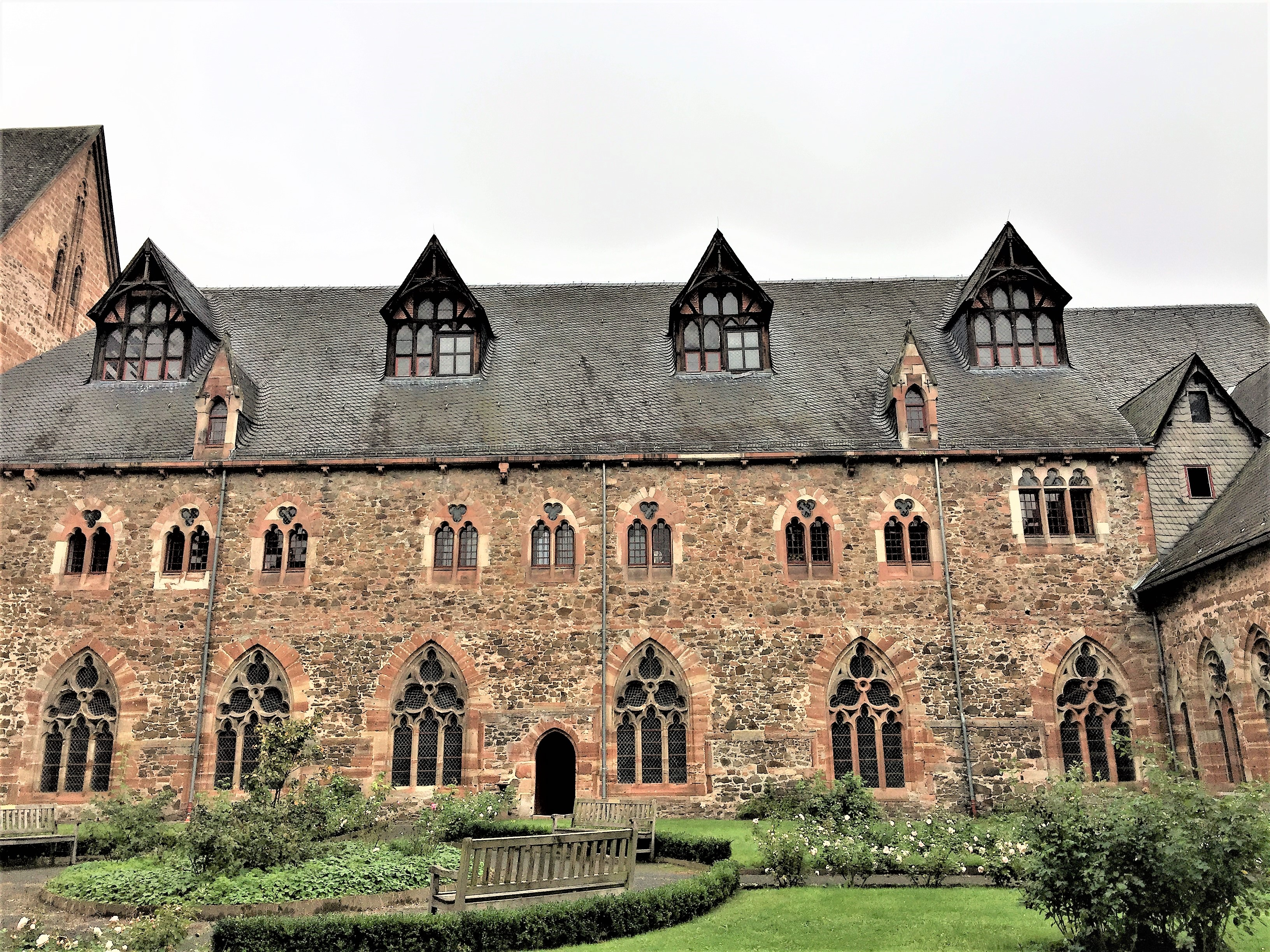

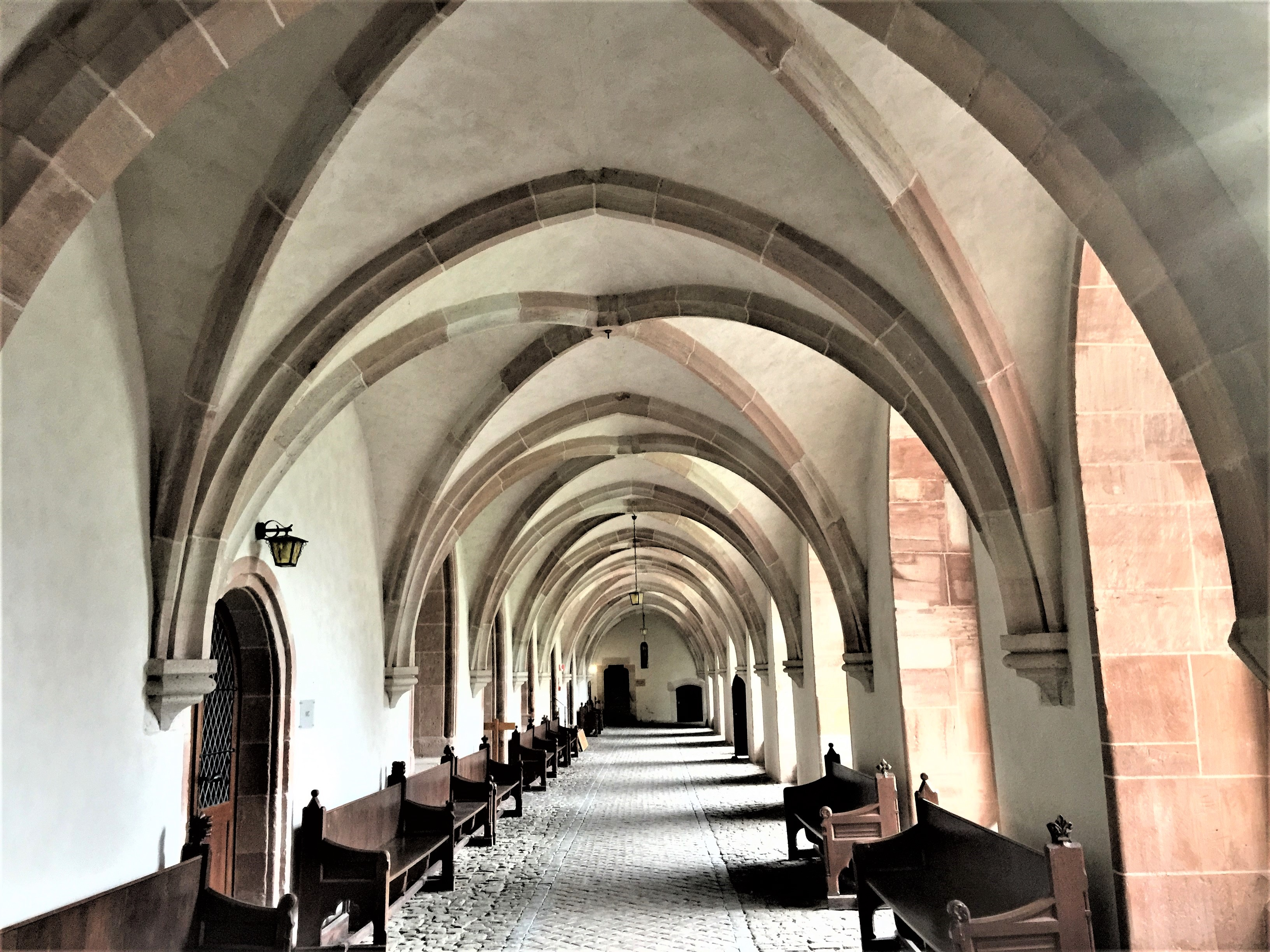
Cloister

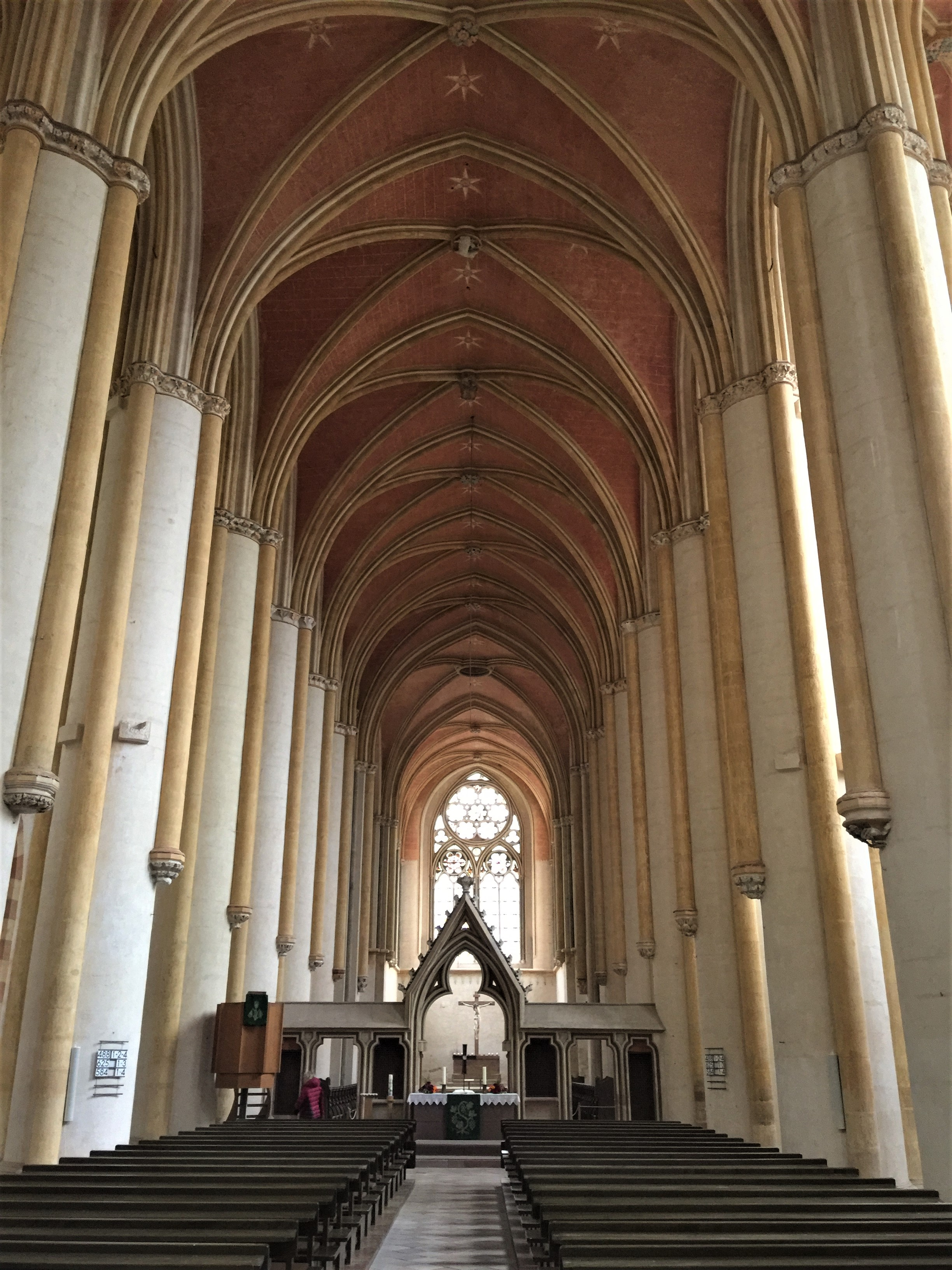
Inside of abbey

== Politics ==
=== Municipal council ===
Haina's council is made up of 23 councillors, with seats apportioned thus, in accordance with municipal elections held on 15 June 2016

The SPD won the Municipal Election making Alexander Köhler the new Mayor

SPD	8 seats
Bürgergemeinschaft Großgemeinde Haina	6 seats
Freie Bürgerschaft Löhlbach	6 seats
Unabhängige Bürger Dodenhausen im Kellerwald	3 seats

Note: Bürgergemeinschaft Großgemeinde Haina, Freie Bürgerschaft Löhlbach and Unabhängige Bürger Dodenhausen im Kellerwald are all citizens' coalitions.

== Sons and daughters of the town ==
- Anton Wilhelm Tischbein (♥ 1 March 1730, Haina - † 1 November 1804, Hanau), known as the Hanauer Tischbein, was a German painter
- Johann Anton Tischbein (♥ 28 August 1720, Haina - † 26 July 1784, Hamburg) was a German painter and art teacher
- Johann Heinrich Tischbein the Elder, (♥ 3 October 1722, Haina – † 22 August 1789, Kassel), known as the Kasseler Tischbein, was one of the most respected European painters in the 18th century
- Johann Heinrich Tischbein the Younger (♥ 28 November 1742, Haina - † 22 December 1808, Kassel), was a German painter and engraver
- Johann Heinrich Wilhelm Tischbein (♥ 15 February 1751, Haina – † 26 February 1829, Eutin), known as the Goethe Tischbein, was a German painter
- Johann Jacob Tischbein (♥ 21 February 1725, Haina – † 22/23 August 1791, Lübeck), known as the Lübecker Tischbein, was a German painter

=== Reinhard Schenck zu Schweinsberg ===
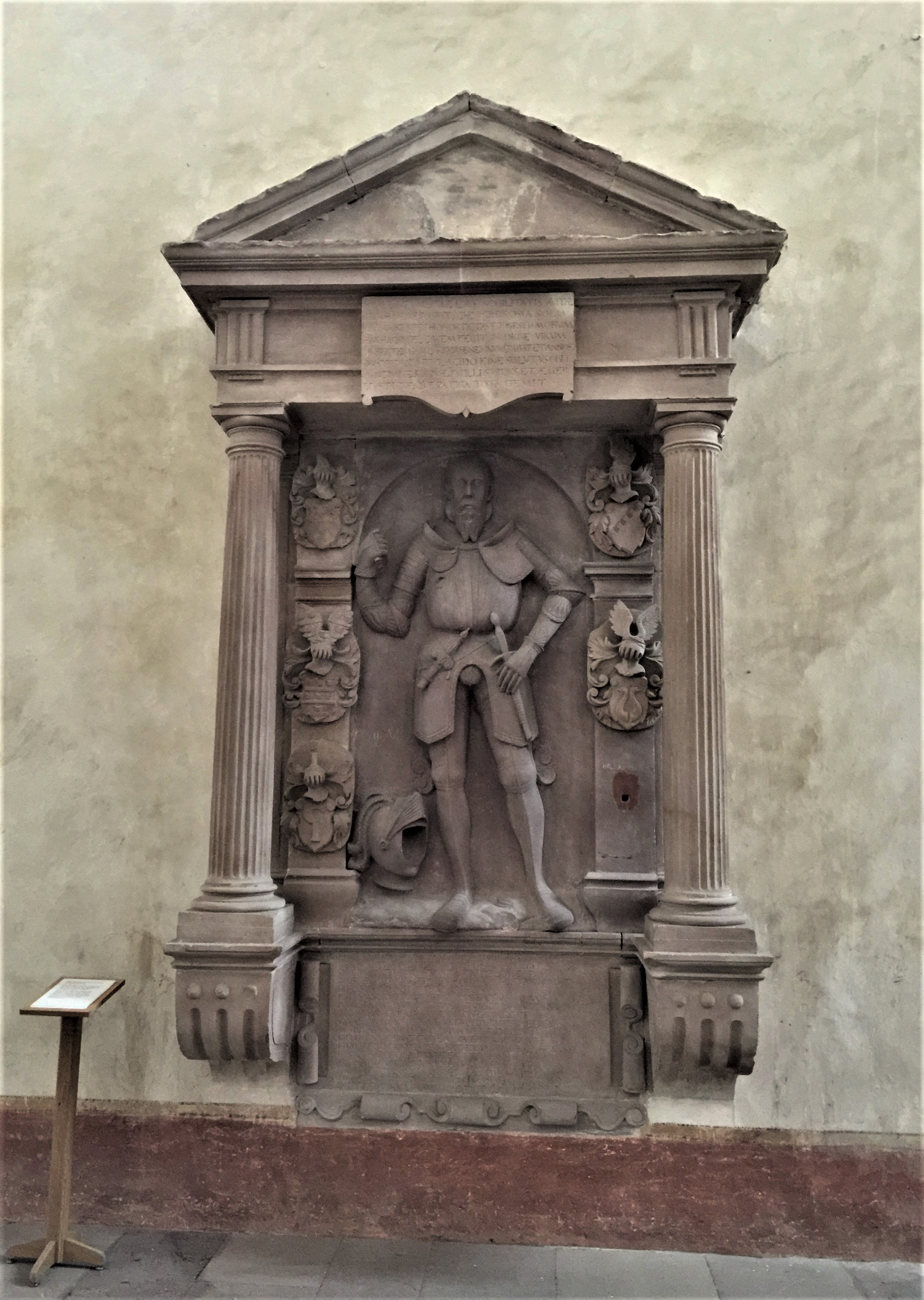
Gravestone Reinhard Schenck zu Schweinsberg at Kloster Haina

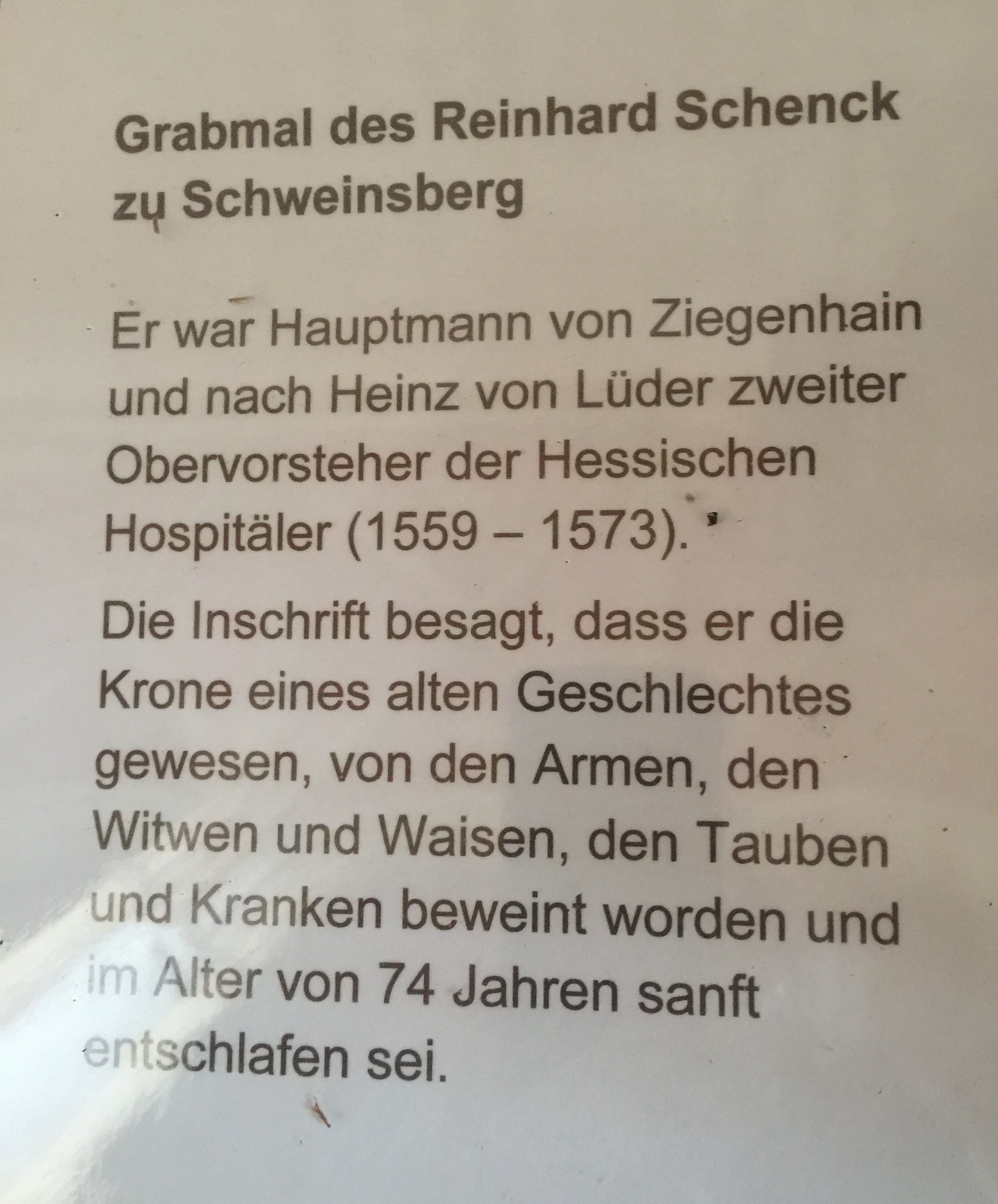
Information panel at Gravestone (in German)

=== Johann Klauer zu Wohra ===
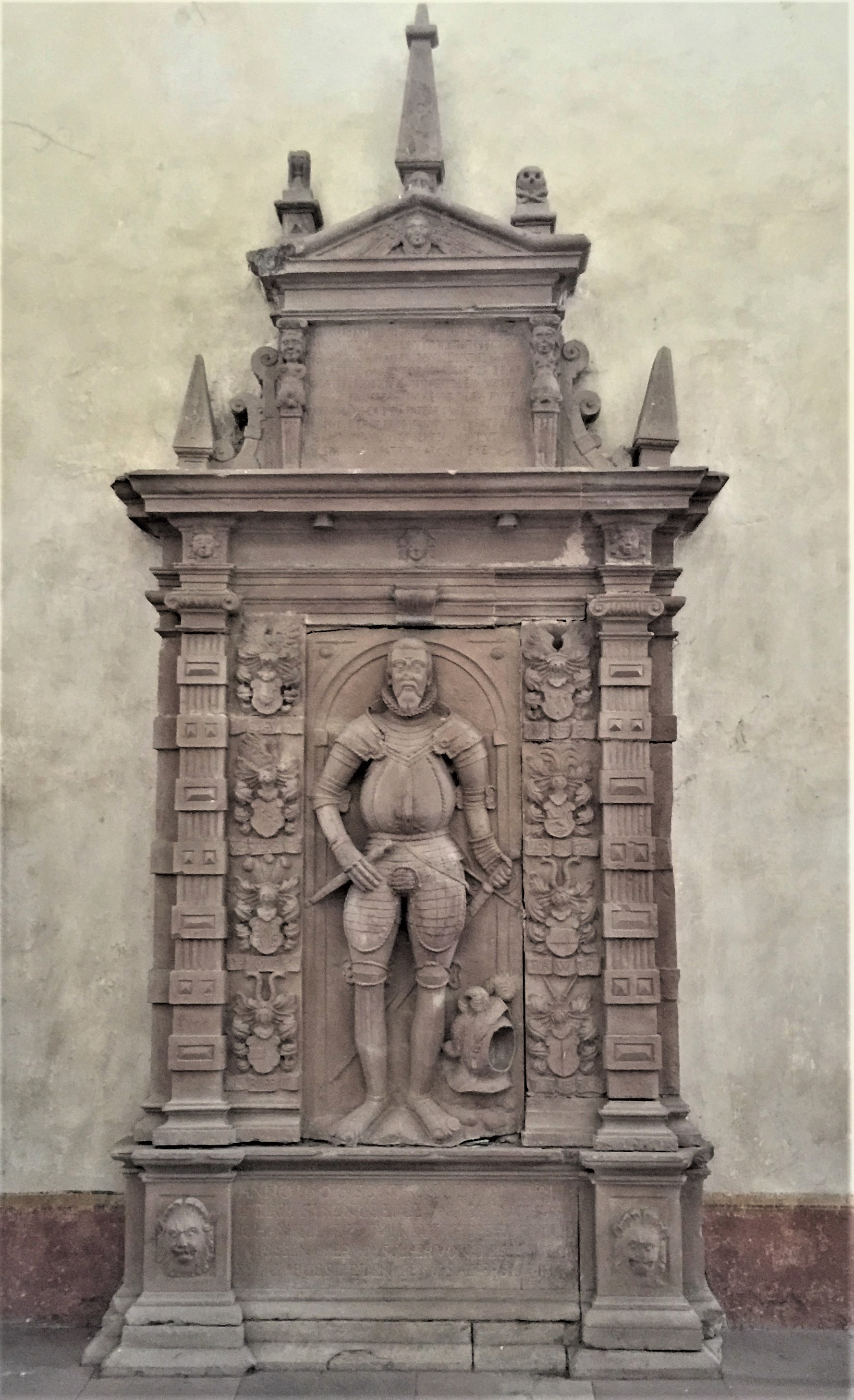
Gravestone Johann Klauer zu Wohra at Kloster Haina

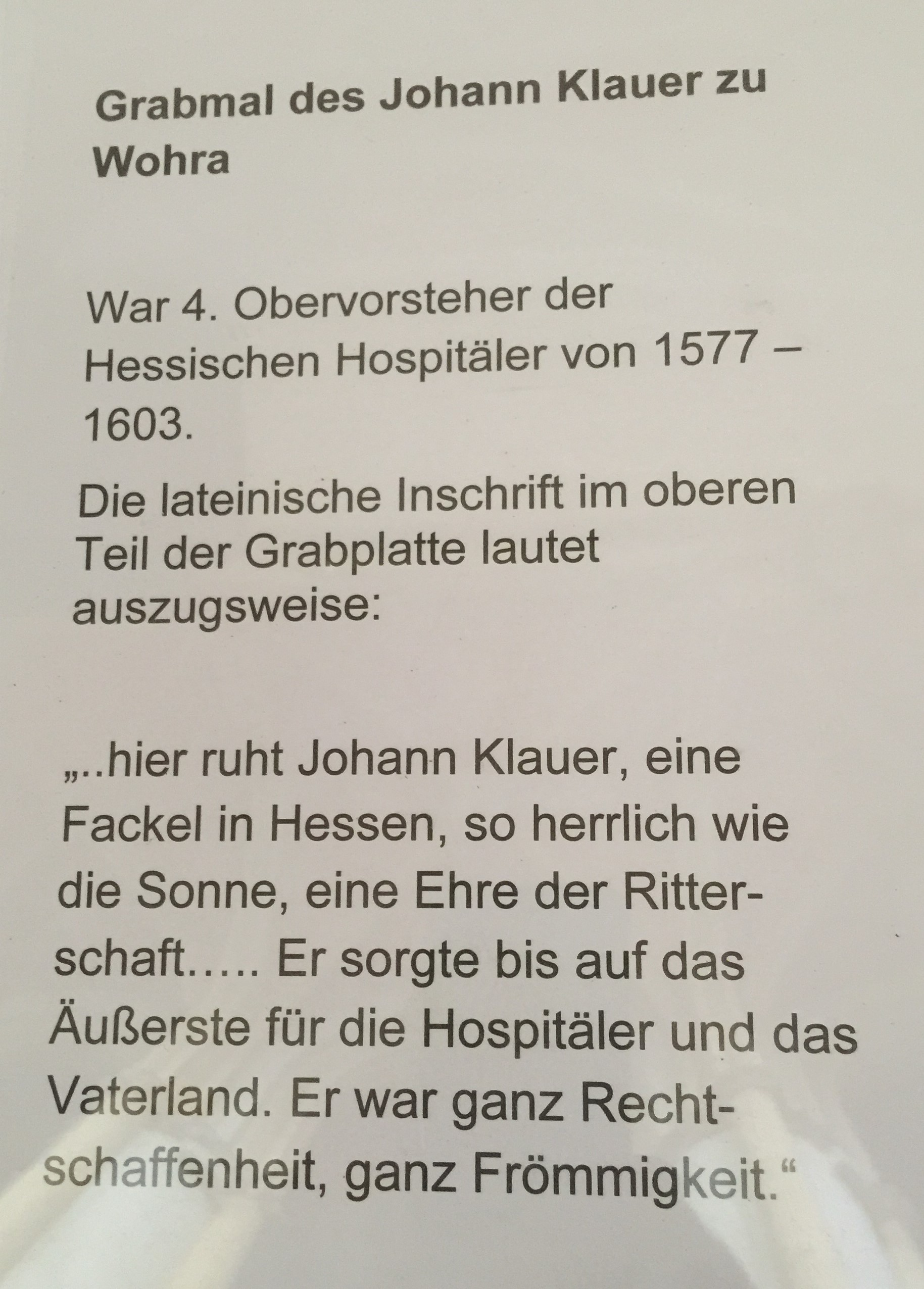
Information panel at Gravestone (in German)

== Museums ==
- Psychiatry museum
- Tischbeinhaus
