= Johann Heinrich Tischbein =

German painter (1722–1789)

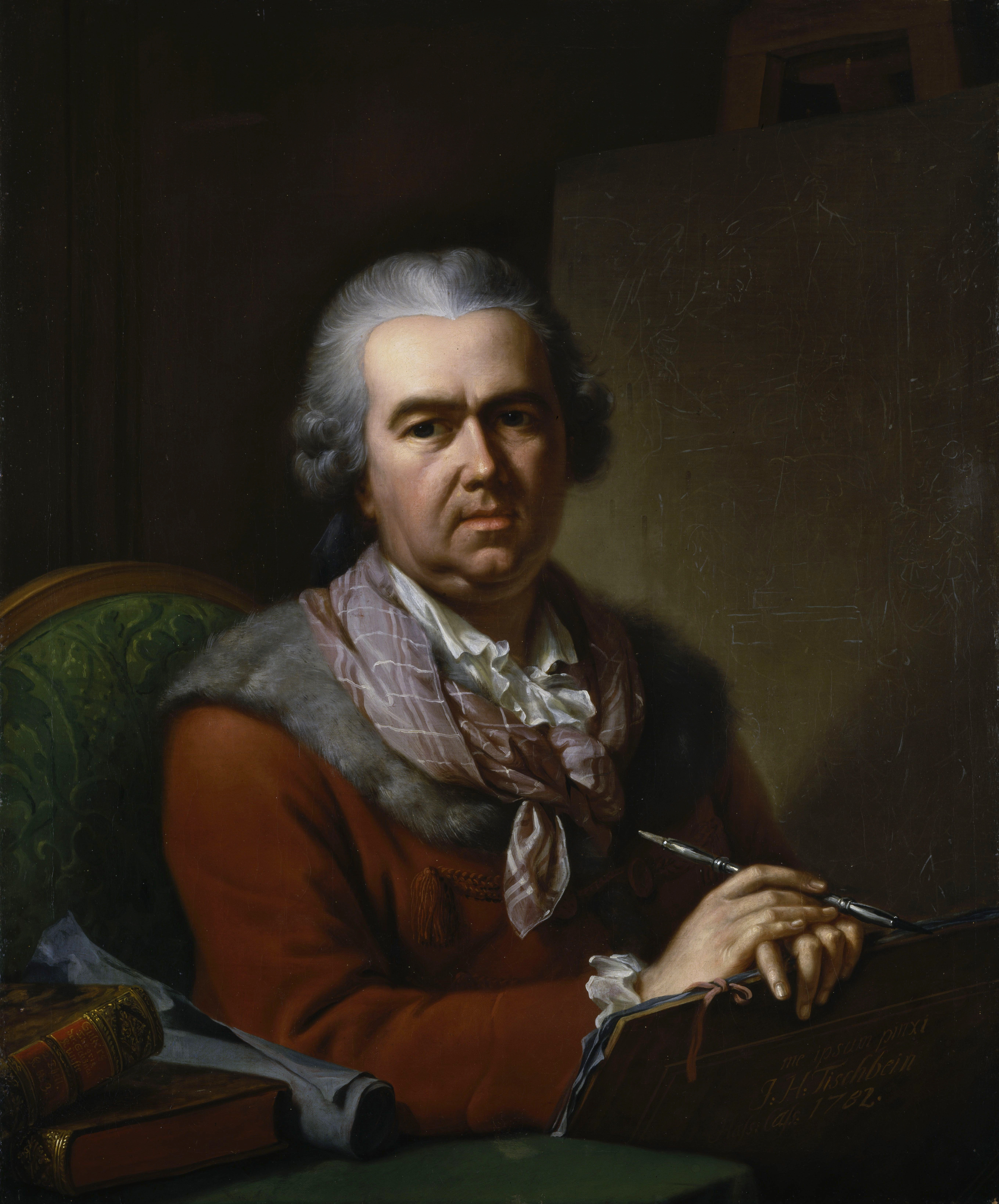
Self-portrait (1770s)

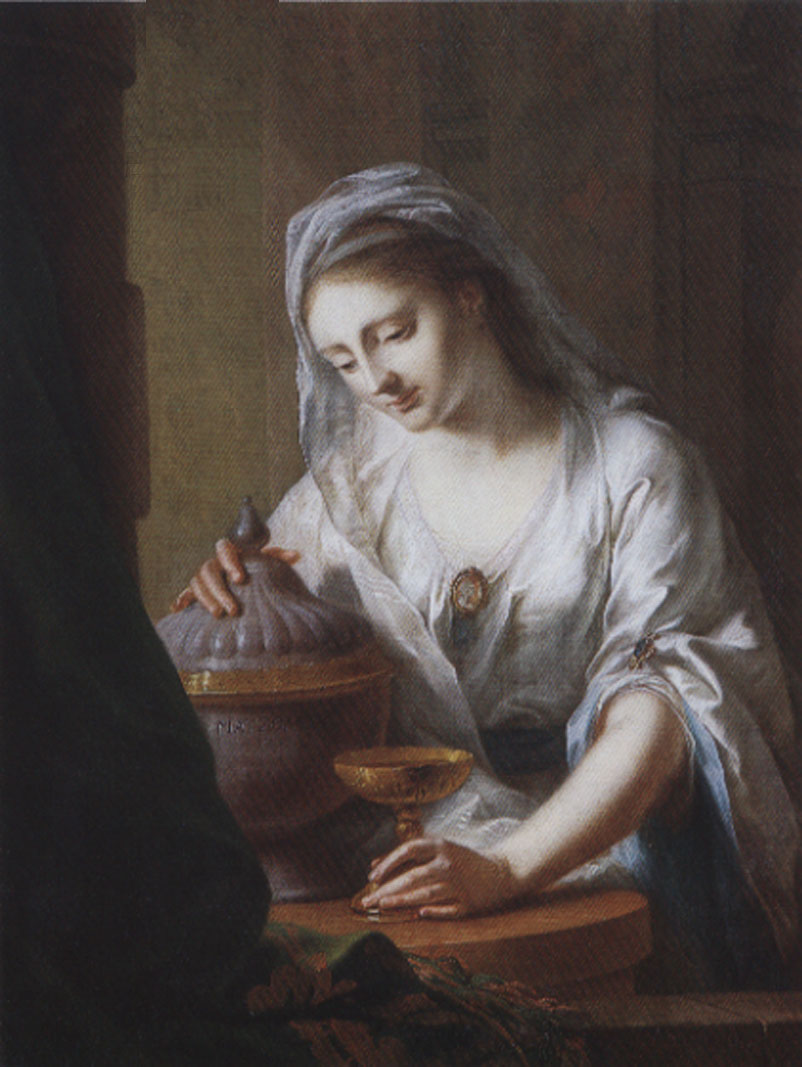
Augusta Reuss-Ebersdorf as Artemisia, 1775

Johann Heinrich Tischbein (3 October 1722 – 22 August 1789) was a German painter. He was one of the most respected European painters in the 18th century and an important member of the Tischbein family of German painters, which spanned three generations. His work consisted primarily of portraits of the nobility, mythological scenes, and historical paintings. For his mythology paintings his models were mostly members of the upper nobility.

== Life ==
His father was Johann Tischbein (1682–1764), a baker; five of whose eight children became painters. From 1736 to 1741, he studied wallpaper painting and, later, oil painting with Johann Georg von Freese (1701–1775), after which he worked in the service of small princely courts. In 1743, thanks to the sponsorship of Count Johann Philipp von Stadion, he was able to go to Paris and study with Carle van Loo.

In 1749, he travelled to Venice to study with Giovanni Battista Piazzetta, then spent a year in Rome. In 1753, he was appointed court painter to William VIII, Landgrave of Hesse-Kassel. In addition to portraits, this included decorations at Schloss Wilhelmsthal. During the Seven Years' War, he fled from the advancing French Army and lived in several locations until the occupation ended in 1762. When he returned, he was appointed a Professor at the new Collegium Carolinum in Kassel.

When he was not teaching, he spent his time at Schloss Warthausen near Biberach an der Riß; an estate owned by his old patron, Stadion. Because of his friendship with Friedrich Gottlieb Klopstock, he also spent some time in Hamburg. He was married twice, in 1756 and 1763, and had two daughters, both by his first wife.

== Works ==
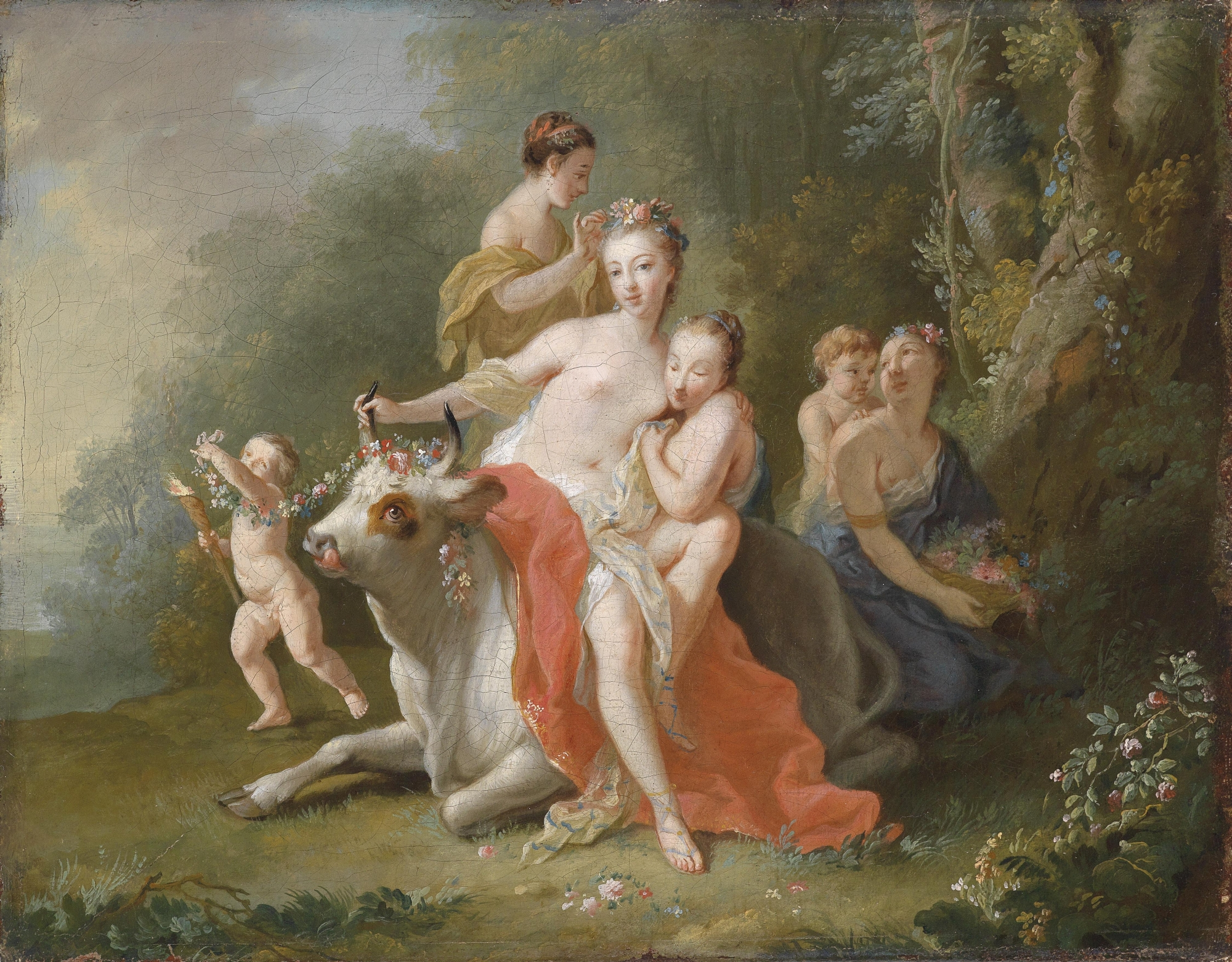
Der Raub der Europa ("The Rape of Europa")

- Resurrection (1763), altarpiece for the St. Michaelis Church, Hamburg, burned in 1906
- Transfiguration (1765), Lutherische Kirche in Kassel
- Passion and Ascension cycle (1778) for the St. Elisabeth Catholic Church in Kassel, now in the Cathedral Museum Fulda
- Kreuzabnahme und Himmelfahrt (1787), altarpiece for the Jakobikirche in Stralsund
- Christ on the Mount of Olives (1788), former Cistercian Monastery in Haina
- Allegory on the Founding of the Kasseler Akademie
- Hercules and Omphale
- May Day at Gut Freienhagen

=== Portraits ===
- Self-portrait with his first wife
- The actress Evérard
- The poet Philippine Engelhard née Gatterer
- Landgraf Friederick II
- Princess Christine Charlotte of Hesse-Kassel
