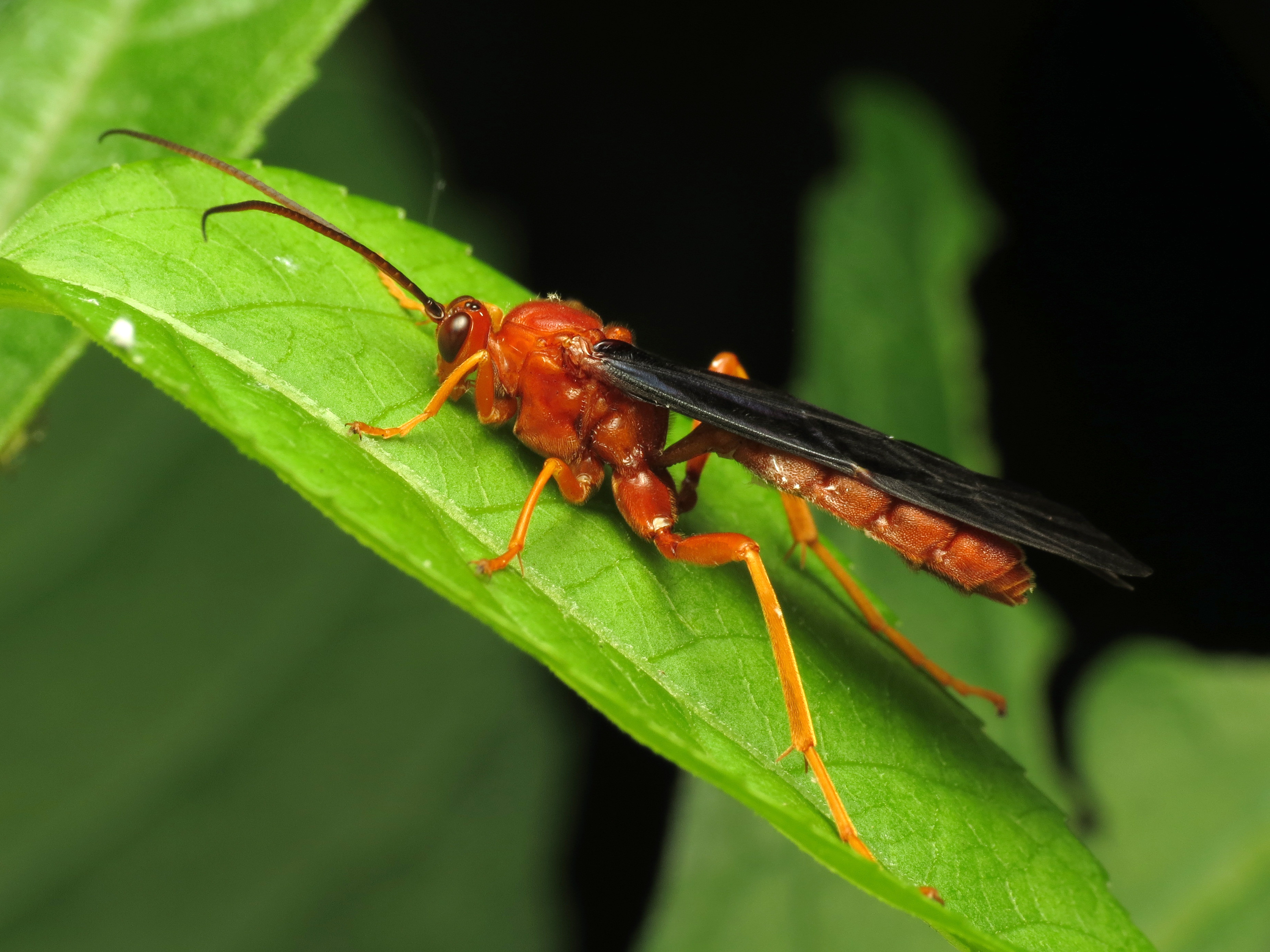
- T. pennator
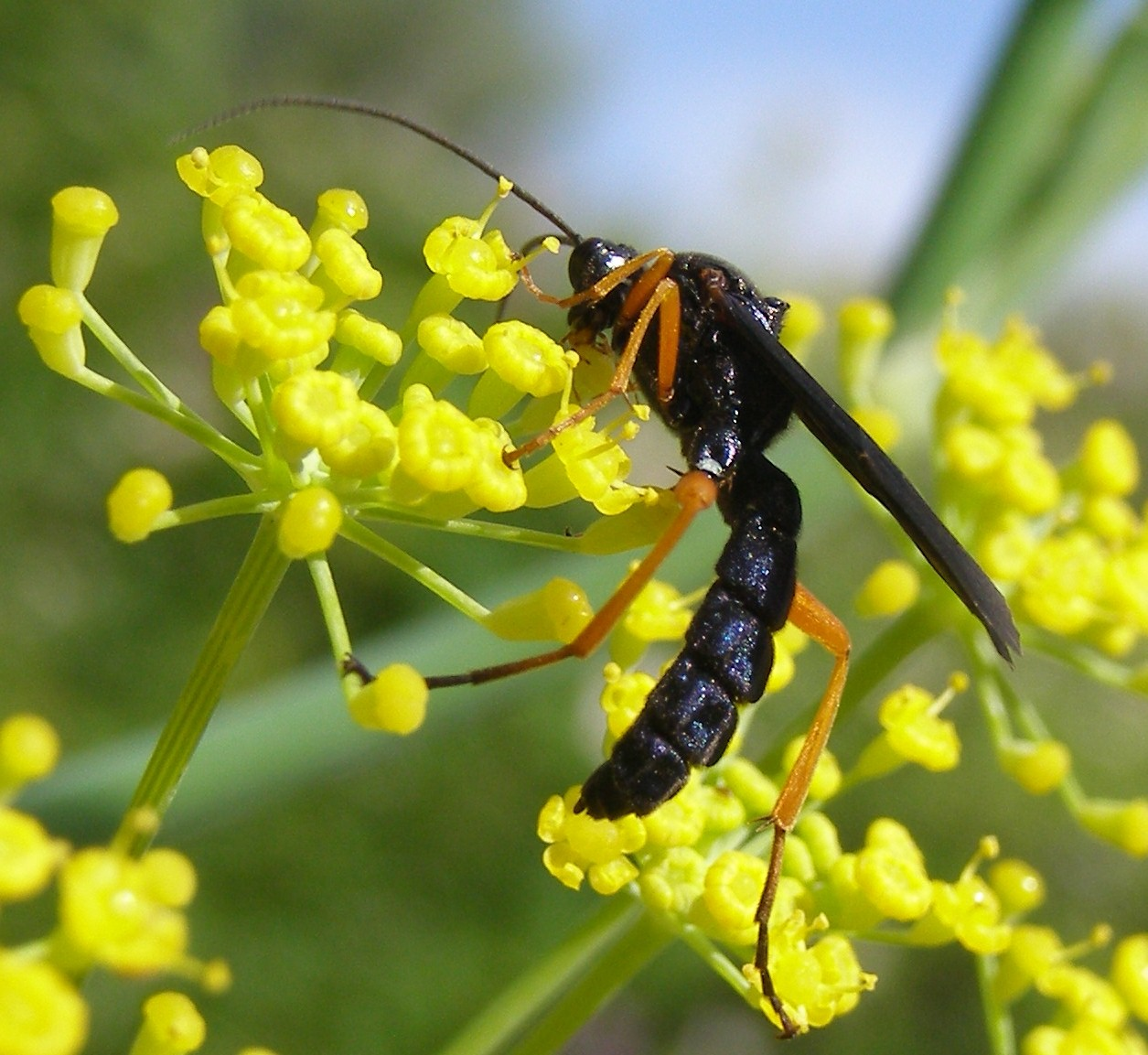
- T. lapidator

Scientific classification
- Kingdom: Animalia
- Phylum: Arthropoda
- Class: Insecta
- Order: Hymenoptera
- Family: Ichneumonidae
- Tribe: Ichneumonini
- Genus: Trogus; Panzer, 1806

Type species
- Ichneumon coerulator Fabricius, 1804

Synonyms
- Dinotomus Förster, 1869

= Trogus (wasp) =

Genus of wasps

Trogus is a genus of parasitoid wasp found in the Holarctic and Neotropic regions. It is placed in the subfamily Ichneumoninae and the tribe Ichneumonini. Trogus species are parasites of larvae and pupae of the swallowtail butterfly family, Papilionidae. The genus consists of twelve extant and one extinct species.

== Etymology ==
The generic name Trogus comes from the ancient Greek word τρώγω (trṓgō) meaning "to gnaw" or "to nibble".

== Taxonomy and phylogeny ==
German entomologist Georg Wolfgang Franz Panzer created the genus Trogus in 1806. He included one species in his circumscription: Trogus coeruleator, (Note: Panzer had actually misspelled the specific epithet in his work; he wrote caeruleator instead of Fabricius's coerulator.) first named in 1804 by Johan Christian Fabricius as Ichneumon coeruleator. In 1829, Johann Ludwig Christian Gravenhorst included eight species in his taxonomy of Trogus. Some subsequent researchers, for instance Arnold Förster and William Harris Ashmead, have referred to a Trogus whose authority is Gravenhorst, but Panzer's sole species in his circumscription of Trogus is included in Gravenhorst's treatment of Trogus and the two of them had the same concept for the genus. In 1840, John O. Westwood designated Gravenhorst's Trogus alboguttatus to be the type species of Trogus. However, this species was later transferred to the genus Goedartia and made its type species. Fabricius's Ichneumon lutorius, included in Gravenhorst's 1829 taxonomy, was also historically considered to be the type species of Trogus; this species is now known as Callajoppa cirrogaster. In 1914, Viereck designated Fabricius's I. coeruleator—the only species Panzer initially included—as the type species for Trogus; this has subsequently been accepted by following taxonomists.

In 1869, Förster created the genus Dinotomus, but did not designate a type species or include any species. In 1900, Ashmead designated Fabricius's Ichneumon lapidator to be the type species; this was one of three species included in V. Berthoumieu's 1896 taxonomy of Dinotomus. In 1910, Per Abraham Roman found Fabricius's I. coeruleator and I. lapidator to be cospecific. This led to Henry Lorenz Viereck synonymizing Dinotomus and Trogus in 1914. The generic name Dinotomus comes from the ancient Greek words δεινός (deinós; "strange") and τομή (tomḗ; "segment"). The genus Psilomastax, named in 1868 by Peter Friedrich Ludwig Tischbein, was once considered to be cogeneric with Dinotomus hence later with Trogus, until it was reinstated as its own genus in 1961 by Henry Townes and colleagues. Ashmead also considered the genus Tricyphus, named by Joseph Kriechbaumer in 1898, to be a synonym of Trogus, but it has since been accepted as its own genus.

Förster placed Trogus in a new family Trogoidae in 1869 alongside Dinotomus and Automalus. In 1895, Ashmead created the tribe Trogini within Ichneumoninae. In 1962, Gerd Heinrich placed Trogus in a new subtribe within Trogini, namely Trogina. In 1979, Robert W. Carlson illegally emended the subtribe name to Trogusina. In 2002, Sime and Wahl synonymized Trogini with Heresiarchini because they found Heresiarchini to be paraphyletic with respect to Trogini; they renamed the clade historically known as Trogini as the Callajoppa genus-group and the clade historically known as Trogina as the Trogus subgroup. In 2021, Santos and colleagues synonymized the tribe Heresiarchini under Ichneumonini and demonstrated that the Trogus subgroup did not nest within the Callajoppa group. Further, the Trogus subgroup of earlier authors did not represent a monophyletic lineage.

== Description and identification ==
Trogus species have a body length of 14–18 mm (0.55–0.71 in). Their abdomens resemble a row of rectangular blocks due to each abdominal segment having thick edges and deep cuts. An autapomorphy of Trogus is a concave apical edge of the clypeus.

== Distribution ==
Trogus species are found in the Holarctic and Neotropics. Sime and Wahl, in part following Gerd Heinrich, proposed Trogus originated in the Palaearctic and crossed into North America following ancestors of the Papilio machaon clade over Beringia. Most Trogus species are found in North America.

The fossil species T. vetus was found in the Florissant Formation and dates to the Eocene. (Note: Other sources date T. vetus to the Miocene or the Oligocene.)

== Biology ==
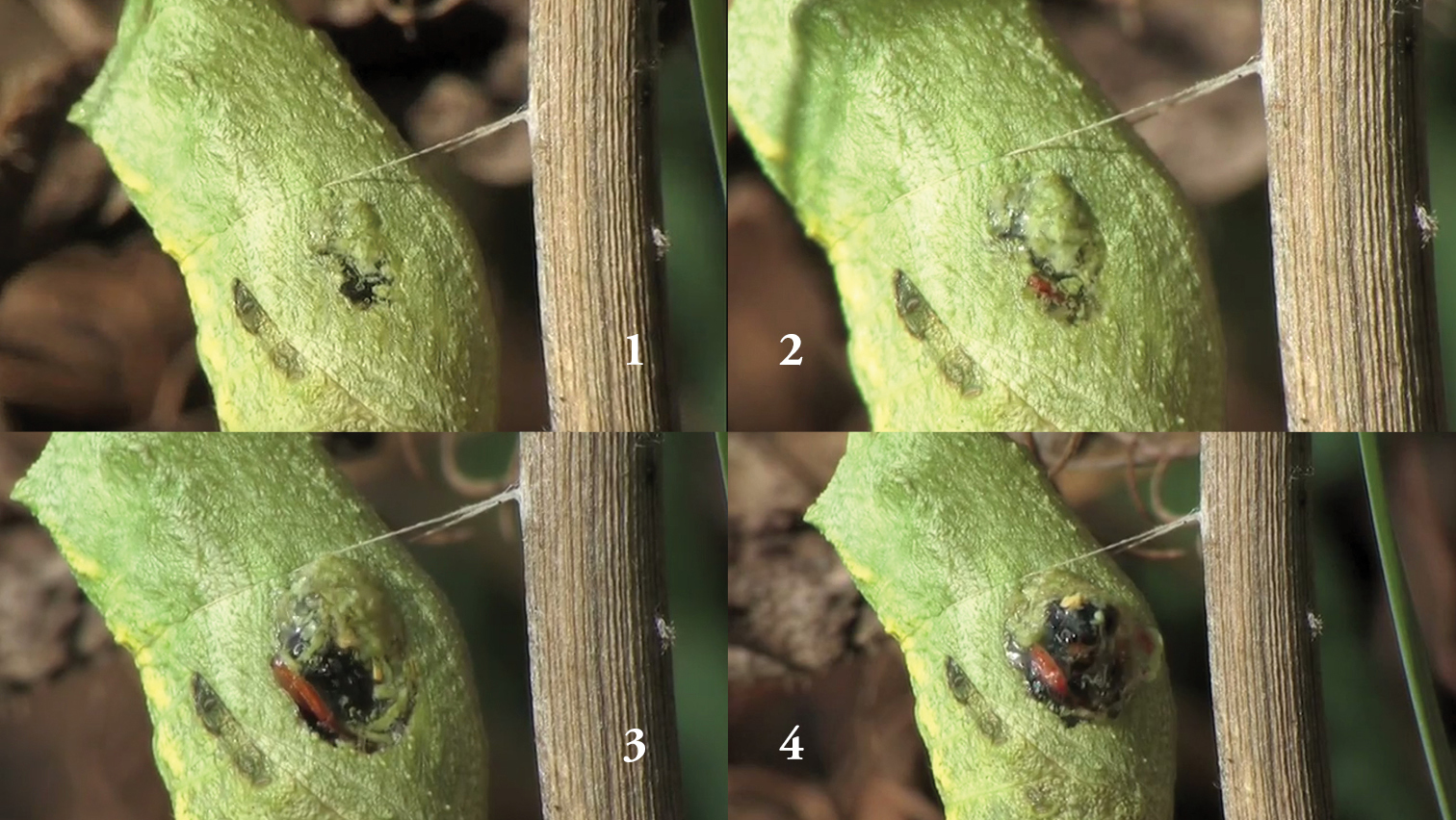
T. lapidator emerging from a Papilio machaon pupa

Trogus select the pupae and larvae of swallowtail butterflies as hosts. The hosts are specifically limited to the tribes Graphiini and Papilionini within the subfamily Papilioninae. However, many species within these tribes are not parasitized by Trogus species; systematic gaps are thought to be a result of plant chemistry in the preferred food for various swallowtail larvae. The butterfly genera with the most reliable host records for Trogus are Papilio and Eurytides. Trogus species vary in how specialized they are, ranging from having one to ten possible swallowtail hosts. The host caterpillars are commonly collected by lepidopterists, amateur and professional, leading to confidence in host range delineation.

All Trogus species are thought to have a similar biology. One egg is laid per larva; some species like T. pennator or T. lapidator can lay their eggs in caterpillars as early as the first instar. Trogus species make their emergence hole by secreting a fluid which softens the pupa cuticle. They emerge as adults through the wing pad creating a distinctive lateral hole; this emergence location is apomorphic for the Trogus subgroup. Diapause, extended diapause, and lack of diapause have all been observed.

== Species ==
David B. Wahl and Karen R. Sime's 2006 revision of the genus recognized the following twelve extant species:

- T. crustosus Wahl, 2006
- T. edwardsii Cresson, 1911
- T. flavipennis Cresson, 1864
- T. fulvipes Cresson, 1868
- T. ixcuinae Wahl, 2006
- T. koreensis Wahl, 2006
- T. lapidator (Fabricius, 1787)
- T. pennator (Fabricius, 1793)
- T. picadoae Wahl, 2006
- T. pompeji (Kriechbaumer, 1898)
- T. thoracicus Cresson, 1865
- T. vulpinus Gravenhorst, 1829

As of 2018, Fossilworks recognizes the following fossil species:

- †T. vetus Brues, 1910
