= Tryphon hinzi =

Scientific classification
- Domain: Eukaryota
- Kingdom: Animalia
- Phylum: Arthropoda
- Class: Insecta
- Order: Hymenoptera
- Family: Ichneumonidae
- Genus: Tryphon
- Species: T. hinzi

Binomial name
- Tryphon hinzi (Heinrich, 1953)

Synonyms
- Symboethus hinzi Heinrich, 1953; Tryphon clauseni Uchida, 1955 Monoblastus clauseni

Species of wasp

Tryphon hinzi is a species of parasitic wasp in the family Ichneumonidae, in the subgenus, Symboethus.

The species was first described in 1953 as Symboethus hinzi by Gerd Heinrich.

These wasps are found in the Palaearctic region from Europe to Russia, Mongolia, and Northeast Asia including Korea.
