= Diphyus temmazanensis =

Scientific classification
- Domain: Eukaryota
- Kingdom: Animalia
- Phylum: Arthropoda
- Class: Insecta
- Order: Hymenoptera
- Family: Ichneumonidae
- Genus: Diphyus
- Species: D. temmazanensis

Binomial name
- Diphyus temmazanensis (Uchida, 1955)

Species of wasp

Diphyus temmazanensis is a parasitoid wasp in the family Ichneumonidae.

It was first described in 1955 by Toichi Uchida, as Limerodops temmazanensis.

This wasp is endemic to the Korean Peninsula, where it is found on Cheonmasan, and Jeju Island.
