= Diphyus akaashii =

Scientific classification
- Kingdom: Animalia
- Phylum: Arthropoda
- Clade: Pancrustacea
- Class: Insecta
- Order: Hymenoptera
- Family: Ichneumonidae
- Genus: Diphyus
- Species: D. akaashii

Binomial name
- Diphyus akaashii (Uchida, 1955)

Synonyms
- Amblyteles trifasciatus var. akaashii Uchida. 1955; Phygadeuon akaashii Uchida, 1930

Species of wasp

Diphyus akaashii is a parasitoid wasp in the family Ichneumonidae.

It was first described in 1955 by Toichi Uchida, as Amblyteles trifasciatus akaashii .

This wasp is found only in East Asia, and throughout the Korean Peninsula.
