= Liotryphon laspeyresiae =

Scientific classification
- Domain: Eukaryota
- Kingdom: Animalia
- Phylum: Arthropoda
- Class: Insecta
- Order: Hymenoptera
- Family: Ichneumonidae
- Subfamily: Liotryphon
- Species: L. laspeyresiae

Binomial name
- Liotryphon laspeyresiae (Uchida, 1932)

Synonyms
- Ephialtes laspeyresiae Uchida, 1932

Species of parasitoid wasp

Liotryphon laspeyresiae is a species of parasitoid wasp belonging to the family Ichneumonidae,

The species was first described in 1932 as Ephialtes laspeyresiae by Toichi Uchida. This wasp is a parasite of the larvae of the moth, Laspeyresia molesta, from which the species epithet derives.

It is found in both Korea, and Japan.

== Description ==
(Translated from the source:)

Female: Head barely punctured, rounded and narrowed behind the eyes; occiput marginal; mandibles of normal formation. Antennae longer than half the body. Thorax elongated, sparsely finely punctured, the thoracic sides smooth and shiny; parapsids weak; propodeum coarsely punctured above, without ridge or furrow, spiracles small and round. Abdomen densely coarsely punctured, the first segment barely longer than wide, the remaining ones transverse, lateral tubercles indistinct. Burrs longer than the body. Wings hyaline, stigma fairly broad, pale yellow. In the hindwing, the radius segment is slightly longer than the retrograde nerve, the nervelus broken almost in the middle. The last hindtarsal segment is almost twice as long as the penultimate one. Body length: 19 mm. Burr length: 12 mm. Antenna length: 8 mm. Black. Antennae brownish towards the end. Clypeus dark brown. Palps yellow. Legs yellowish-red, the trochanters more yellow, the posterior tibiae, tarsi, and femurs blackish brown. Tegules yellow.

Male: Antennae brown below; shaft below, tegules, forelegs, and midlegs, posterior trochanters and their tibiae pale yellow, the hind limbs and femurs red, their tibiae at the end and tarsi blackish. Body length: 12 mm.
