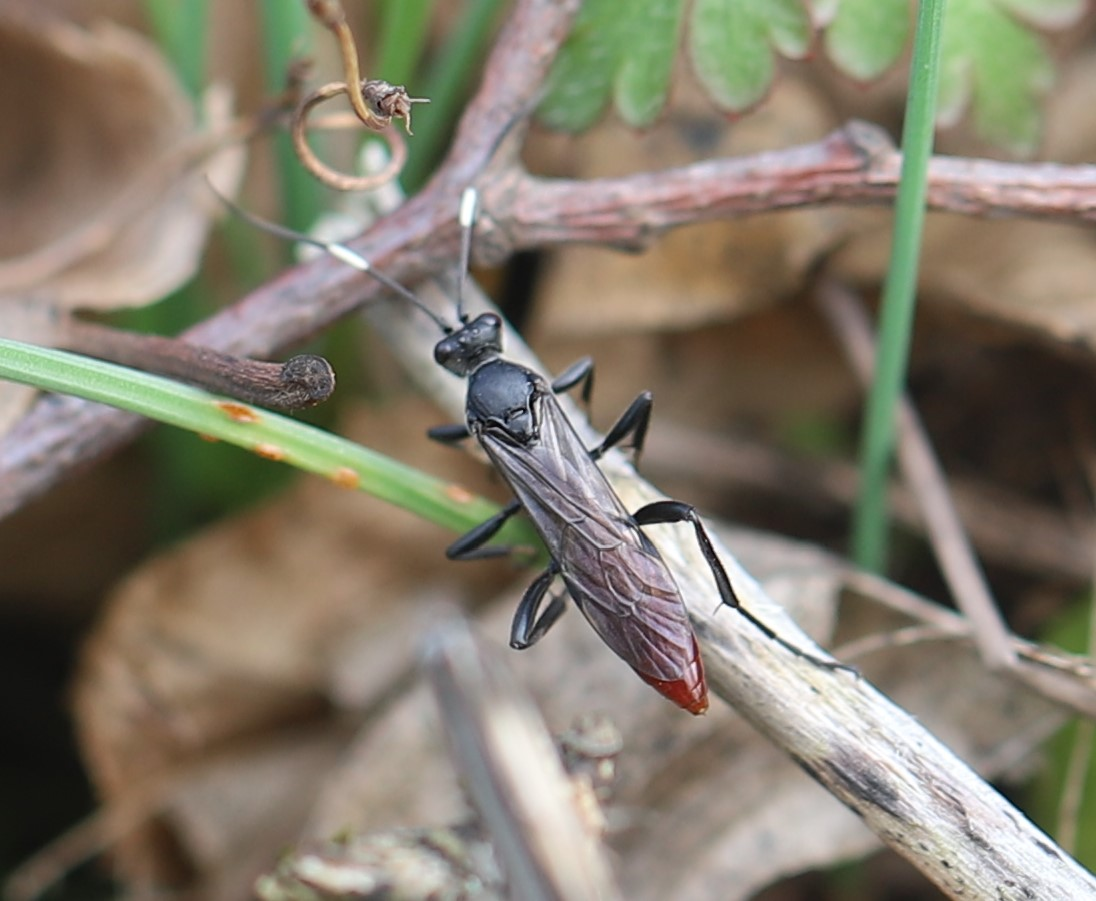
- Diphyus castanopyga

Scientific classification
- Kingdom: Animalia
- Phylum: Arthropoda
- Class: Insecta
- Order: Hymenoptera
- Family: Ichneumonidae
- Subfamily: Ichneumoninae
- Genus: Diphyus; Kriechbaumer, 1890

= Diphyus =

Genus of wasps

Diphyus is a genus of parasitoid wasps belonging to the family Ichneumonidae.

The genus was first described in 1890 by Joseph Kriechbaumer. (In the contents, the new genus is listed as Diphyes, a genus name which had already been used (1817) in the animal kingdom for a cnidarian genus, but in the text he described the genus Diphyus. He immediately follows this description with a description of Diphyes tricolor, which he references later in 1891 with the name Diphyus tricolor. Thus, the species is Diphyus tricolor.

The genus has an almost cosmopolitan distribution.

Some species:

- Diphyus akaashii (Uchida, 1955)
- Diphyus adventor (Berthoumieu, 1892)
- Diphyus albicoxalis (Uchida, 1927)
- Diphyus duodecimguttorius (Uchida, 1955)
- Diphyus higebutonis (Uchida, 1955)
- Diphyus iwatai (Uchida, 1955)
- Diphyus palliatorius (Gravenhorst, 1829)
- Diphyus quadripunctorius
- Diphyus restitutor (Wesmael, 1859)
- Diphyus salicatorius (Gravenhorst, 1820)
- Diphyus suigensis (Uchida, 1927)
- Diphyus tricolor (Kim, 1955) Kriechbaumer, 1890
- Diphyus temmazanensis (Uchida, 1955)
