= Diphyus suigensis =

Scientific classification
- Domain: Eukaryota
- Kingdom: Animalia
- Phylum: Arthropoda
- Class: Insecta
- Order: Hymenoptera
- Family: Ichneumonidae
- Genus: Diphyus
- Species: D. suigensis

Binomial name
- Diphyus suigensis (Uchida, 1927)

Synonyms
- Amblyteles suigensis Uchida, 1927

Species of wasp

Diphyus suigensis is a parasitoid wasp in the family Ichneumonidae.

It was first described in 1927 by Toichi Uchida, as Amblyteles suigensis.

This wasp is endemic to Korean Peninsula.
