= Tryphon nagahamensis =

Scientific classification
- Domain: Eukaryota
- Kingdom: Animalia
- Phylum: Arthropoda
- Class: Insecta
- Order: Hymenoptera
- Family: Ichneumonidae
- Genus: Tryphon
- Species: T. nagahamensis

Binomial name
- Tryphon nagahamensis Uchida, 1930

Synonyms
- Tryphon sibiricus Kasparyan, 1969; Tryphon satoi Uchida, 1955

Species of wasp

Tryphon nagahamensis is a species of wasp in the family Ichneumonidae, subfamily Tryphoninae.

The species was first described in 1930 by Toichi Uchida, from a specimen collected in Nagahama, whence the species epithet, nagahamensis.

This wasp is found in Korea, Japan, and the Russian Far East.

== Synonymy ==
The species, Tryphon satoi, described by Uchida 1n 1955, was synonymised by Kasparyan in 1973 to Monoblastus clauseni. In the same article Uchida also described Tryphon clauseni which was synonymised in 1965 with Tryphon satoi by Townes, Momoi & Townes.(However neither the texts of Kasparyan nor that of Townes et al cannot be verified, and at least two online databases confirm the synonymy given here.)
