= Diphyus iwatai =

Scientific classification
- Domain: Eukaryota
- Kingdom: Animalia
- Phylum: Arthropoda
- Class: Insecta
- Order: Hymenoptera
- Family: Ichneumonidae
- Genus: Diphyus
- Species: D. iwatai

Binomial name
- Diphyus iwatai (Uchida, 1955)

Synonyms
- Amblyteles iwatai Uchida. 1955

Species of wasp

Diphyus iwatai is a parasitoid wasp in the family Ichneumonidae.

It was first described in 1955 by Toichi Uchida, as Amblyteles iwatai. He described it from specimens found on Takadaisan (in Korea) and in Tamba (Japan).

This wasp is found on the Korean Peninsula and in Japan.
