= Tryphon brevipetiolaris =

Scientific classification
- Domain: Eukaryota
- Kingdom: Animalia
- Phylum: Arthropoda
- Class: Insecta
- Order: Hymenoptera
- Family: Ichneumonidae
- Genus: Tryphon
- Species: T. brevipetiolaris

Binomial name
- Tryphon brevipetiolaris Uchida, 1955

Synonyms
- Tryphon fraudator Kasparyan, 1969

Species of wasp

Tryphon breviopetiolaris is a species of parasitic wasp in the family Ichneumonidae, in the subgenus, Symboethus.

The species was first described in 1955 by Toichi Uchida.

It is found in Japan, and Korea.

== Partial description ==
The ovipositor of the female "is distinguished from other Palearctic species of this genus by the short broad ovipositor sheaths and highly decurved ovipositor".
