= Diphyus higebutonis =

Scientific classification
- Domain: Eukaryota
- Kingdom: Animalia
- Phylum: Arthropoda
- Class: Insecta
- Order: Hymenoptera
- Family: Ichneumonidae
- Genus: Diphyus
- Species: D. higebutonis

Binomial name
- Diphyus higebutonis (Uchida, 1955)

Synonyms
- Amblyteles higebutonis Uchida. 1955

Species of wasp

Diphyus higebutonis is a parasitoid wasp in the family Ichneumonidae.

It was first described in 1955 by Toichi Uchida, as Amblyteles higebutonis.

This wasp is endemic to the Korean Peninsula.
