= Diphyus tricolor =

Scientific classification
- Domain: Eukaryota
- Kingdom: Animalia
- Phylum: Arthropoda
- Class: Insecta
- Order: Hymenoptera
- Family: Ichneumonidae
- Genus: Diphyus
- Species: D. tricolor

Binomial name
- Diphyus tricolor Kriechbaumer, 1890

Species of wasp

Diphyus tricolor is a parasitoid wasp in the family Ichneumonidae.

It was first described in 1890 by Joseph Kriechbaumer as Diphyes tricolor, a description which immediately followed his description of the new genus, Diphyus. This description was referenced in his 1891 publication as Diphyus tricolor. This wasp is found in Europe.

The wasp (also named Diphyus tricolor) which is said to be endemic to Korean Peninsula, would seem to be a different species.
