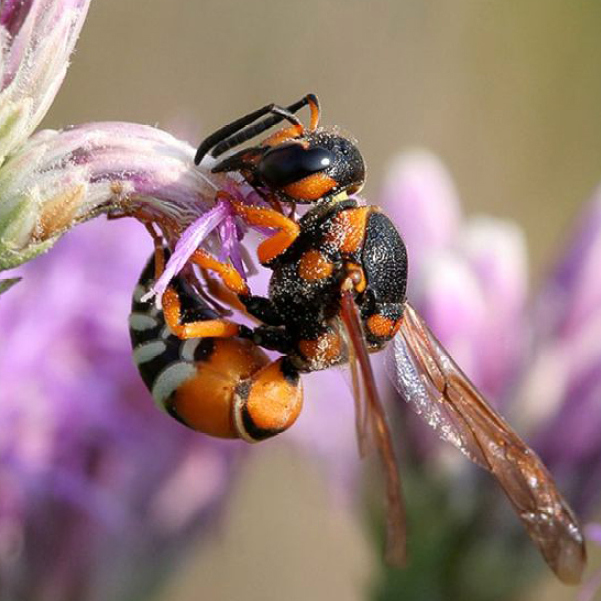
- Onychopterocheilus pallasii

Scientific classification
- Kingdom: Animalia
- Phylum: Arthropoda
- Class: Insecta
- Order: Hymenoptera
- Family: Vespidae
- Subfamily: Eumeninae
- Genus: Onychopterocheilus; Blüthgen, 1955

Type species
- Onychopterocheilus rectus (Dalla Torre, 1889)

Species
- See text

= Onychopterocheilus =

Genus of wasps

Onychopterocheilus is a Palearctic genus of potter wasps.

== Species ==
The following species are classified as members of the genus Onychopterocheilus:

- Onychopterocheilus albopictus (Kriechbaumer, 1869)
- Onychopterocheilus anatolicus (Blüthgen, 1955)
- Onychopterocheilus angustipalpus (Kostylev, 1940)
- Onychopterocheilus atrohirtus (Morawitz, 1885)
- Onychopterocheilus bensoni (Giordani Soika, 1943)
- Onychopterocheilus bytinskii (Gusenleitner, 1970)
- Onychopterocheilus chinensis Gusenleitner, 2005
- Onychopterocheilus crabroniformis (Morawitz, 1867)
- Onychopterocheilus dallatorrei (Morawitz, 1895)
- Onychopterocheilus dementievi (Kostylev, 1940)
- Onychopterocheilus debrochersi (Kostylev, 1940)
- Onychopterocheilus eburneus (Blüthgen, 1955)
- Onychopterocheilus ecarinatus (Morawitz, 1895)
- Onychopterocheilus eckloni (Morawitz, 1885)
- Onychopterocheilus fereniger (Giordani Soika, 1952)
- Onychopterocheilus flaviventris Gusenleitner, 1991
- Onychopterocheilus fuscohirtus (Moravitz, 1895)
- Onychopterocheilus glomeratus (Giordani Soika, 1977)
- Onychopterocheilus grandiceps (Blüthgen, 1955)
- Onychopterocheilus hellenicus (Morawitz, 1885)
- Onychopterocheilus hirtus (Kostylev, 1935)
- Onychopterocheilus inversus (Kostylev, 1935)
- Onychopterocheilus kiritschenkoi (Kostylev, 1940)
- Onychopterocheilus lelegrius Kurzenko, 1976
- Onychopterocheilus luteocinctus (Blüthgen, 1955)
- Onychopterocheilus matritensis (Dusmet, 1909)
- Onychopterocheilus menzbieri (Kostylev, 1940)
- Onychopterocheilus mirus Gusenleitner, 1995
- Onychopterocheilus mochii (Giordani Soika, 1942)
- Onychopterocheilus nigropilosus (Kostylev, 1940)
- Onychopterocheilus ornatus (Lepeletier, 1841)
- Onychopterocheilus pallasii (Klug, 1805)
- Onychopterocheilus rectus (Dalla Torre, 1889)
- Onychopterocheilus rongsharensis (Giordani Soika, 1977)
- Onychopterocheilus rudolphae (Kurzenko, 1976)
- Onychopterocheilus rufipes (Gusenleitner, 1971)
- Onychopterocheilus sareptanus (Kurzenko, 1976)
- Onychopterocheilus skorikovi (Kostylev, 1940)
- Onychopterocheilus spheciformis (Gusenleitner, 1970)
- Onychopterocheilus stiziformis (Gusenleitner, 1970)
- Onychopterocheilus turovi (Kostylev, 1936)
- Onychopterocheilus unipunctatus (Lepeletier, 1841)
- Onychopterocheilus waltoni (Meade-Waldo, 1913)
- Onychopterocheilus wuhaensis Gusenleitner, 2005
