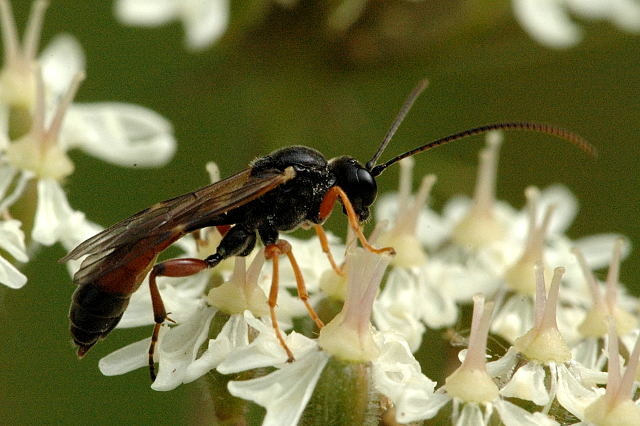

Scientific classification
- Domain: Eukaryota
- Kingdom: Animalia
- Phylum: Arthropoda
- Class: Insecta
- Order: Hymenoptera
- Family: Ichneumonidae
- Genus: Tryphon
- Species: T. brunniventris

Binomial name
- Tryphon brunniventris Gravenhorst, 1829

= Tryphon brunniventris =

Species of wasp

Tryphon brunniventris is a species of parasitic wasp in the family Ichneumonidae, in the subgenus, Symboethus.

The species was first described in 1929 by J.L.C. Gravenhorst.

This wasp is found in Korea, and is widely distributed in Europe, Russia and Far East Asia. It is a palearctic species.

== Description ==
Gravenhorst's description:

Segmentis 2—4 rufis; tibiis femoribusque rufis, posticis summo apice nigro; antennis subtus ferrugineis; areola triangulari. m.f. Longitudo 27,—5 linearum. Caput palpis stramineis aut piceis; mandibulis ut plurimum medio fulvis aut ferrugineis; labro plerumque rubricoso aut fulvo; interdum margine clypei, rarius clypeo toto, fulvo (de structura partium oris consule notam ad hanc speciem); facie rarissime maculis duabus rubricosis subobsoletis. antennae rarissime ferrugineae subtus fulvae, plerumque fuscae subtus ferrugineae aut fuscoferrugineae, articulo 1 ut plurimum toto nigro. lae fumatohyalinae, stigmate et radio nigris, rarius ferrugineis, radice straminea, squamula nigra rarissime picea; areola subirregulari subsessili. Pedes rufi, coxis et trochanteribus fuscescentibus aut nigris, postici plerumque geniculis et tibiarum apice nigris, tarsis supra fuscis. abdomen subsessile, plerumque sericeum, maris capite thoraceque longius etangustius, seu thoracis latitudine, oblongum aut .sublineare, feminae capite thoraceque paulo longius. thoracis latitudine, oblongum seu oblongo ovatum aut sublineare apice erassiore; segmento 1 profunde canaliculato, castaneo basi nigra, aut nigro margine castaneo rufove; 2—-4 rufis aut castaneis; reliquis nigris, 5 interdum macula laterali castanea. Aculeus brevissimus exsertus niger. Mares et feminas copiose legi mense Iunio in prato, in floribus umbellatis, prope Barterodam; quosdam etiam, eodem mense, in gramine et in Írutetis circa Vratislaviam, nec non, mense Augusto, prope Helmstadium in umbellatis, cepi; nonnulla individua, circa Niesky, Norimbergam et in Austria capta, mihi transmissa sunt.

== Parasitism ==
According to Kasparyan (1973) the female of this species deposits her eggs on the host larvae "dorsally on the membrane between the first and second thoracic segments".
