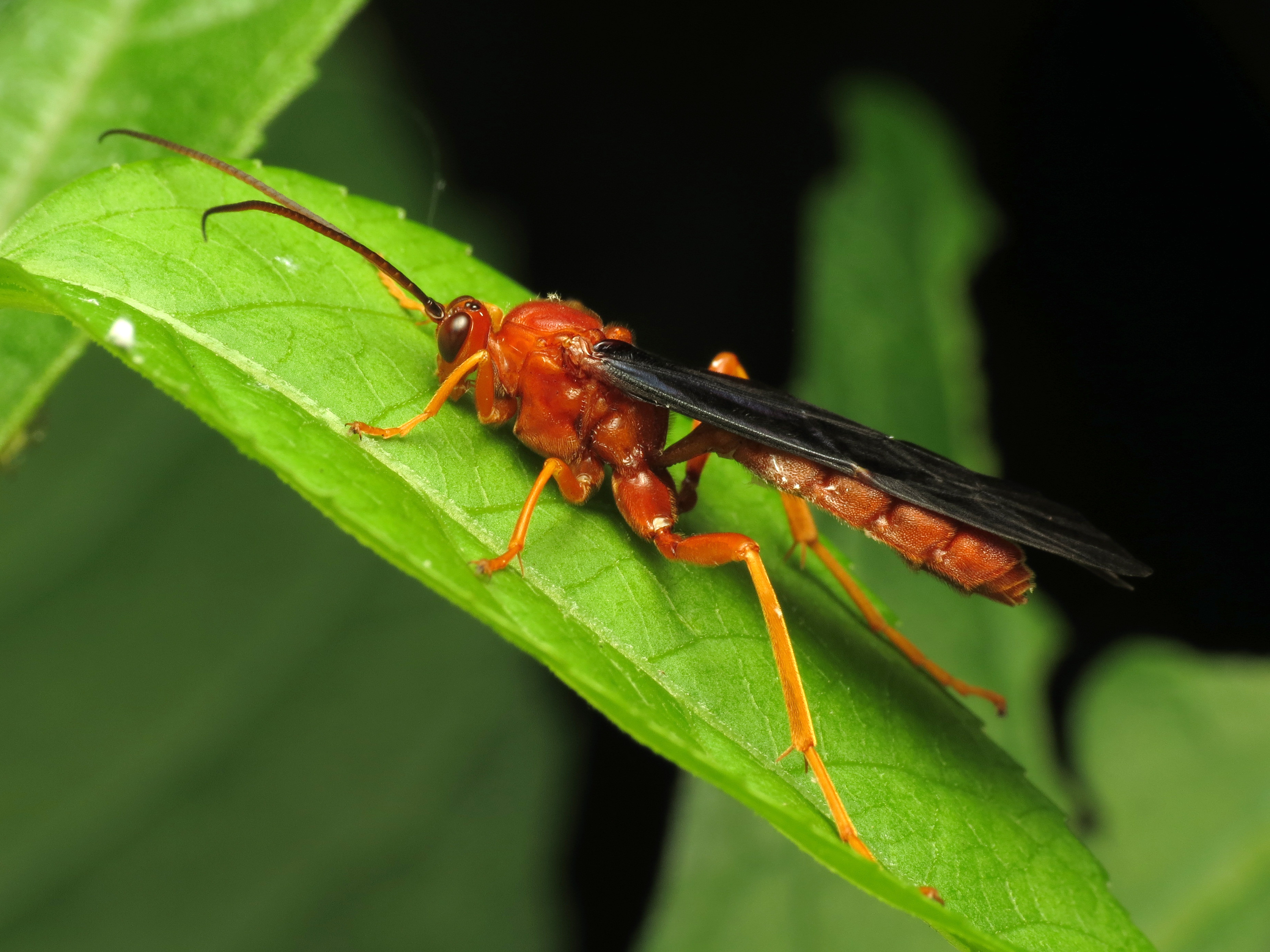

Scientific classification
- Kingdom: Animalia
- Phylum: Arthropoda
- Class: Insecta
- Order: Hymenoptera
- Family: Ichneumonidae
- Genus: Trogus
- Species: T. pennator

Binomial name
- Trogus pennator (Fabricius, 1793)

= Trogus pennator =

Species of insect

Trogus pennator is a species of parasitoid wasp in the genus Trogus. Trogus pennator contains the following subspecies:

- Trogus pennator argutus
