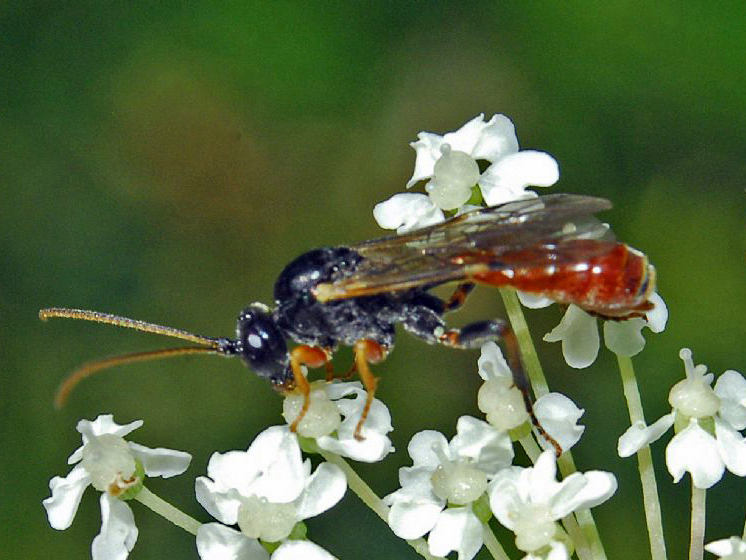
- Tryphon rutilator

Scientific classification
- Domain: Eukaryota
- Kingdom: Animalia
- Phylum: Arthropoda
- Class: Insecta
- Order: Hymenoptera
- Family: Ichneumonidae
- Subfamily: Tryphoninae
- Genus: Tryphon; Fallén, 1813

Species
- See text

= Tryphon (wasp) =

Genus of wasps

Tryphon is a genus of wasps belonging to the family Ichneumonidae.

== Species ==
Species within this genus include:

- Tryphon abditus
- Tryphon amasidis
- Tryphon ambiguus
- Tryphon americanus
- Tryphon aridus
- Tryphon armatus
- Tryphon asiaticus
- Tryphon atratus
- Tryphon atriceps
- Tryphon auricularis
- Tryphon bidentatus
- Tryphon bidentulus
- Tryphon bilineolatus
- Tryphon braccatus
- Tryphon brevipetiolaris
- Tryphon brunniventris
- Tryphon cadaver
- Tryphon calceolatus
- Tryphon californicus
- Tryphon caucasicus
- Tryphon cingulipes
- Tryphon collaris
- Tryphon communis
- Tryphon coquilletti
- Tryphon debilis
- Tryphon deliciosus
- Tryphon duplicatus
- Tryphon errator
- Tryphon eupitheciae
- Tryphon exareolatus
- Tryphon excavatus
- Tryphon exclamationis
- Tryphon exiguus
- Tryphon exobscurus
- Tryphon expers
- Tryphon explanatum
- Tryphon flavescens
- Tryphon flavilabris
- Tryphon flavoclypeatus
- Tryphon florissantensis
- Tryphon foraminatus
- Tryphon fulvilabris
- Tryphon fulviventris
- Tryphon geminator
- Tryphon grossus
- Tryphon haematopus
- Tryphon hamatus
- Tryphon hamulator
- Tryphon heliophilus
- Tryphon himalayensis
- Tryphon hinzi
- Tryphon humilis
- Tryphon illotus
- Tryphon incisus
- Tryphon jezoensis
- Tryphon laevis
- Tryphon lapideus
- Tryphon latrator
- Tryphon leucodactylus
- Tryphon leucostictus
- Tryphon lusorius
- Tryphon machaerus
- Tryphon mauritanicus
- Tryphon mesochoroides
- Tryphon mutilatus
- Tryphon mystax
- Tryphon nagahamensis
- Tryphon nigrinus
- Tryphon nigripes
- Tryphon obtusator
- Tryphon palmaris
- Tryphon peltiger
- Tryphon peregrinus
- Tryphon psilosagator
- Tryphon punctatus
- Tryphon rarus
- Tryphon relator
- Tryphon rempeli
- Tryphon rennenkampffii
- Tryphon rufonotatus
- Tryphon rugosus
- Tryphon rutilator
- Tryphon scapulator
- Tryphon seminiger
- Tryphon senex
- Tryphon sexpunctatus
- Tryphon signator
- Tryphon subsulcatus
- Tryphon talitzkii
- Tryphon teberda
- Tryphon thomsoni
- Tryphon thoracicus
- Tryphon townesi
- Tryphon translucens
- Tryphon trochanteratus
- Tryphon ussuriensis
- Tryphon utilis
- Tryphon viator
- Tryphon zavreli
- Tryphon zonatus
