= Diphyus albicoxalis =

Scientific classification
- Domain: Eukaryota
- Kingdom: Animalia
- Phylum: Arthropoda
- Class: Insecta
- Order: Hymenoptera
- Family: Ichneumonidae
- Genus: Diphyus
- Species: D. albicoxalis

Binomial name
- Diphyus albicoxalis (Uchida, 1927)

Synonyms
- Amblyteles albicoxalis Uchida, 1927

Species of wasp

Diphyus albicoxalis is a parasitoid wasp in the family Ichneumonidae.

It was first described in 1927 by Toichi Uchida, as Amblyteles albicoxalis.

This wasp is found on the Korean Peninsula, and in Russia.
