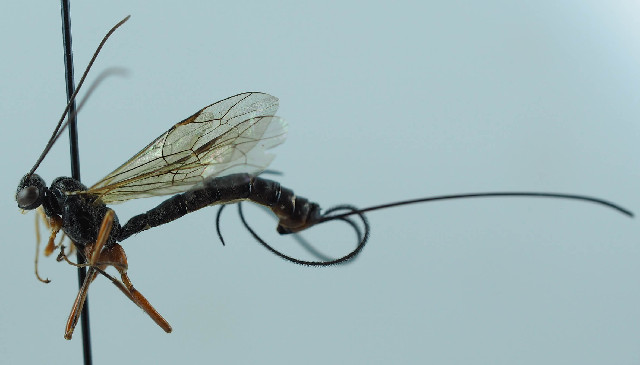
- .

Scientific classification
- Kingdom: Animalia
- Phylum: Arthropoda
- Class: Insecta
- Order: Hymenoptera
- Family: Ichneumonidae
- Genus: Liotryphon
- Species: L. caudatus

Binomial name
- Liotryphon caudatus (Ratzeburg, 1848)

Synonyms
- Pimpla caudatus Ratzeburg, 1848

= Liotryphon caudatus =

Species of parasitoid wasp

Liotryphon caudatus is a species of parasitoid wasp belonging to the family Ichneumonidae.

It was first described in 1948 as Pimpla caudatus by J.T.C. Ratzeburg

It is native to Europe, and an exotic species in New Zealand.
