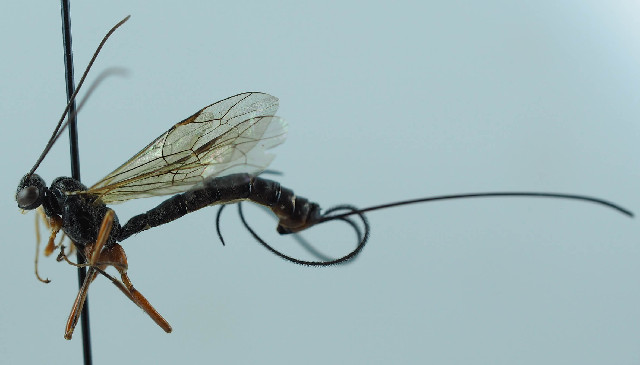
- Liotryphon caudatus

Scientific classification
- Domain: Eukaryota
- Kingdom: Animalia
- Phylum: Arthropoda
- Class: Insecta
- Order: Hymenoptera
- Family: Ichneumonidae
- Tribe: Ephialtini
- Genus: Liotryphon; Ashmead, 1900

Type species
- Liogaster punctulatus Ratzeburg, 1848

Synonyms
- Liogaster Kriechbaumer, 1890; Apistes Seyrig, 1927; Apistephialtes Seyrig, 1928; Neoephialtes Constantineanu & Pisica, 1970

= Liotryphon =

Genus of parasitoid wasps

Liotryphon is a genus of insect belonging to the family Ichneumonidae, in the subfamily Pimplinae.

== Taxonomy ==
The genus was first described in 1900 by William Harris Ashmead as a replacement name for Liogaster Kriechbaumer, 1890 (junior homonym of Liogaster Meyer, 1844). Liotryphon is also a senior synonym of Apistephialtes Seyrig, 1928, a replacement name for Apistes Seyrig, 1927 (junior homonym of Apistes Fischer, 1823).

== Species ==
Liotryphon contains at least 27 species:

- Liotryphon arcticus (Roman, 1926)
- Liotryphon aruni Gupta & Tikar, 1976
- Liotryphon ascaniae (Rudow, 1883)
- Liotryphon atriceps (Cresson, 1874)
- Liotryphon burmensis Gupta & Tikar, 1976
- Liotryphon caudatus (Ratzeburg, 1848)
- Liotryphon cercopithecus (Costa, 1885)
- Liotryphon coracinus (Townes, 1960)
- Liotryphon crassicephalus (Constantineanu & Pisica, 1970)
- Liotryphon crassiseta (Thomson, 1877)
- Liotryphon cydiae (Perkins, 1942)
- Liotryphon dentatus (Townes, 1960)
- Liotryphon gauldi Khalaim & Ruíz-Cancino, 2022
- Liotryphon gracilis Gupta & Tikar, 1976
- Liotryphon heterocerus (Hensch, 19360)
- Liotryphon laspeyresiae (Uchida, 1932)
- Liotryphon masoni (Townes, 1960)
- Liotryphon nucicola (Cushman, 1931)
- Liotryphon petulcus (Cresson, 1872)
- Liotryphon pronotalis Kasparyan, 1985
- Liotryphon punctulatus (Ratzeburg, 1848)
- Liotryphon pygmaeus Gupta & Tikar, 1976
- Liotryphon rostratus (Constantineanu & Pisica, 1977)
- Liotryphon rufithorax Gupta & Tikar, 1976
- Liotryphon strobilellae (Linnaeus, 1758)
- Liotryphon tamajalus Khalaim & Ruíz-Cancino, 2022
- Liotryphon variatipes (Provancher, 1886)
