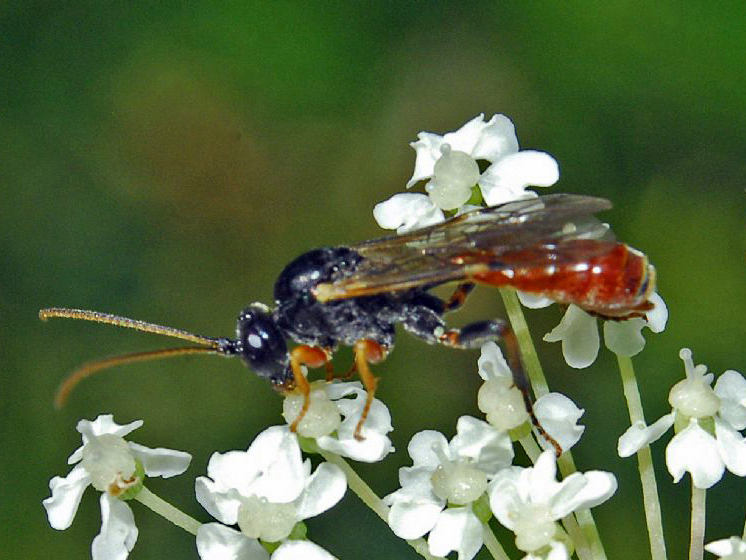

Scientific classification
- Kingdom: Animalia
- Phylum: Arthropoda
- Class: Insecta
- Order: Hymenoptera
- Family: Ichneumonidae
- Genus: Tryphon
- Species: T. rutilator

Binomial name
- Tryphon rutilator (Linnaeus, 1761)

Synonyms
- Tryphon anodon (Schrank, 1802); Tryphon cepae (Geoffroy, 1785); Tryphon ceparum (Schrank, 1802); Tryphon impraegnator (Schrank, 1781); Tryphon insultator (Gravenhorst, 1807); Tryphon quadratus Stephens, 1835

= Tryphon rutilator =

Species of wasp

Tryphon rutilator is a species of the family Ichneumonidae, subfamily Tryphoninae.

== Distribution and habitat ==
This European-Siberian species is present in most of Europe and Siberia, in the Near East, and in the Oriental realm. These insects mainly inhabit hedge rows.

== Description ==
Tryphon rutilator can reach a body length of 7–11 millimetres (0.28–0.43 in), with forewings of 5–9 millimetres (0.20–0.35 in). Head is weakly compressed posteriorly, witt long yellowish antennae consisting of 29-35 segments. Frons has a weak longitudinal carina. These ichneumonids have a black body and reddish abdomen. Legs are mainly yellow-reddish, with black femurs and tibiae on posterior legs.

== Biology ==
Adults can be found from June to July. They mainly feed on nectar of Apiaceae species (especially Anthriscus sylvestris and Heracleum sphondylium).
