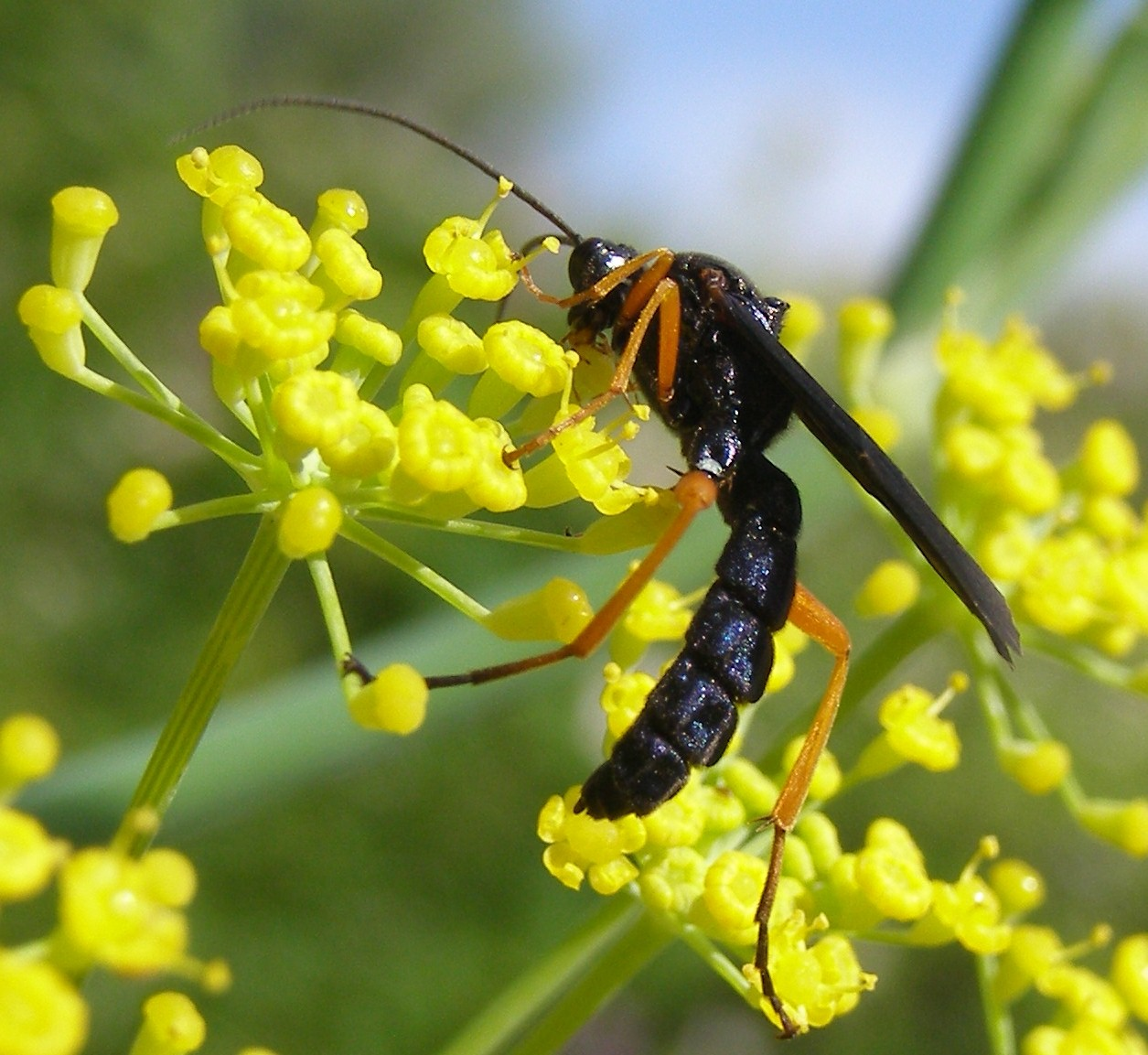

Scientific classification
- Kingdom: Animalia
- Phylum: Arthropoda
- Clade: Pancrustacea
- Class: Insecta
- Order: Hymenoptera
- Family: Ichneumonidae
- Genus: Trogus
- Species: T. lapidator

Binomial name
- Trogus lapidator (Fabricius, 1787)

= Trogus lapidator =

Species of wasp

Trogus lapidator is a species of ichneumon wasp in the family Ichneumonidae. It is a parasitoid of the species Papilio machaon, and emerges from the butterfly's pupal stage, killing its host in the process.
