= Gerd Heinrich =

German entomologist and ornithologist

Gerd Hermann Heinrich
- Born: November 7, 1896; Berlin, Germany
- Died: December 16, 1984; Farmington, Maine, United States
- Scientific career
- Fields: Entomologist

Gerd Hermann Heinrich (7 November 1896 in Berlin, Germany – 16 December 1984 in Farmington, USA) was a German entomologist and ornithologist known for his studies of parasitic Hymenoptera of the Ichneumonidae family and for the description of several bird species in Celebes, Dutch East Indies.

== Early life and education ==
Heinrich was born on 7 November 1896 in Berlin. He was the son of a physician, Hermann Heinrich. His mother, Margarethe von Tepper-Ferguson, was the heiress of a 1,344 ha farm at Borowke, between Poznań and Gdańsk, Poland. Heinrich grew up at Borowke which, prior to 1918, was in West Prussia. He was educated at home by a tutor until age eight and became fluent in Polish, German and Latin. In 1914, Heinrich graduated primus omnium from the Askanische Gymnasium in Berlin. Heinrich planned a career in medicine, but his interest was in natural history, especially insects. He sought the advice of the curator of entomology at the Museum für Naturkunde and was guided towards study of parasitic wasps of the family Ichneumonidae, a large, diverse, and at that time, taxonomically poorly known group of insects. Heinrich's education was interrupted by the onset of hostilities of World War I. He enlisted in the German army as a cavalryman fighting on the Eastern front and earned the Iron Cross he then transferred to the Luftstreitkräfte and became a pilot. After the war, Heinrich returned to Borowke, married a local girl, Annaliese Machatchek and lived there with his family.

== Career ==
=== Europe ===
In 1927, Heinrich made an expedition to Mount Elbrus in Northern Persia. From 1930 to 1932, he visited the island of Sulawesi (Celebes) in Indonesia, including the Latimodjong mountains, Menkoka mountains, and Minahasa and the Molucca Islands including Halmahera and Batjan. From 1932 to 1937, Heinrich studied at the Humboldt University in Berlin and in 1932, he published a travelogue about Celebes. In 1934, Heinrich published his first major work, Die Ichneumoninae von Celebes (1934). In 1935, he made an expedition to the Balkan Mountains and the Rhodope Mountains in South-Eastern Europe. In 1938, he published the results of processing his collection of materials of the Ichneumoninae of Madagascar in Les Ichneumonides de Madagascar (1938).

In 1934, René Malaise, the Swedish entomologist, had organised a zoological expedition to the northeastern parts of Burma. The material he collected was sent to Heinrich for identification and classification. The abundance of bizarre, luxuriant, and unknown forms in this collection was so fascinating that Heinrich made his own expedition to the Chin Hills of Burma in 1937 and 1938.

=== World War II ===
In 1939, at the onset of hostilities in World War II, Heinrich's work was once again interrupted by war. Reluctantly, Heinrich enlisted in the German army, aware that for a Pole to not do so could be fatal. In 1941, as the Russians pushed the Eastern front through Poland, Annaliese and the children fled westward. By the end of 1943, Heinrich did have a large monograph on oriental Ichneumoninae prepared for publication but as the front line approached, Heinrich soldered his monograph into a metal box, and secretly buried it in a dry place in the forest. He sent another copy to his friend, the physical chemist Max Vollmer.

Henirich and his family lived in a small forester's hut in Hahnheide Forest from 1945 until 1951, when they emigrated to the United States. Postwar Europe was a difficult place for academics. Heinrich contacted zoological organizations in every corner of Europe but not one of them had the funds for publication of his monograph. Heinrich did receive the sponsorship of the ichneumonologist, Henry K. Townes, Jr. to emigrate.

=== America ===
In 1952 and 1953, Heinrich took part in a zoological expedition to Mexico. Between the years 1953 and 1963, he participated in expeditions to Africa, mainly to collect birds and mammals for Yale University, the University of Kansas, and the Field Museum of Natural History. During this time, he expanded his collection of ichneumon flies. Between 1953 and 1955, Heinrich participated in an expedition to Mount Moco and Mount Soke, Angola, West Africa. In 1957 and 1958 Heinrich returned to West Africa. From 1961 to 1963 he took part in an expedition to Tanganyika, Mount Meru, the Usambara Mountains, the Uluguru Mountains, the Livingston range and Mount Rungwe and the Ufipa Plateau in Tanzania and Rhodesia. In 1963, Heinrich visited South Africa.

Heinrich received partial support from the Canadian Department of Agriculture to complete the seven volume work Synopsis of Nearctic Ichneumoninae Stenopneusticae (1962).

In 1960, Heinrich realized that he would never return to access the Asian Ichneumoninae material he had hidden. He wrote to the Polish Academy of Sciences in Warsaw, describing the material's location and suggested using mine detectors to find the metal boxes containing the material. Polish scientists did just that, and, to everyone's surprise, the insect specimens were preserved. The specimens were added to the collection of the Polish Academy of Sciences. The Academy invited Heinrich to work with the material at his discretion. Heinrich wrote on his memoir, "…this obstacle for the publication of the Oriental Monograph was, at last, eliminated".

The materials collected in his African expeditions were published in Synopsis and Reclassification of the Ichneumoninae of Africa, south of the Sahara through a grant from the National Science Foundation, by Farmington College Press. In preparation for this monograph, Heinrich made a round trip through Europe. He visited all the major European museums to examine their African specimens. In Stockholm, he met the entomologists Erich Kjellander and René Malaise. The new version of Burmesische Ichneumoninae was published in seven parts in Entomologisk Tidskrift. A remaining four parts were subsequently published in the Annales Zoologici by the Polish Academy of Sciences from 1974 to 1980.

In 1977, Heinrich's last major monograph, Ichneumoninae of Florida and neighboring states (1977) was published. It contains descriptions of 50 genera and 135 species, 47 of which were new to science. His last article was published in 1980.

== End of life and legacy ==
On December 16, 1984 Heinrich died aged 88. He was survived by his wife, Hildegarde Bury Heinrich of Wilton; son, Bernd Heinrich of the University of Vermont; daughters, Marianne Gerda Sewall of Jefferson and Ursula Wartowski of Chicago, and four grandchildren.

Many species of insects, especially Hymenoptera are named after Heinrich. The Heinrichiellus hildegardae is named for Heinrich's wife, Hildegarde Maria.

== Contributions ==
During his career, Heinrich developed a standardized system of taxa description which facilitates taxa identification and comparative analysis. He is the author of 4 major publications on Ichneumonidae, 4 popular travelogues, 93 smaller but significant publications on Ichneumoninae, 3 publications on European mammals, 3 publications on the biology of the birds of Angola, and 2 publications on the systematics of the birds of Angola, coauthored with Sidney Dillon Ripley. Heinrich described 1479 species and subspecies of Ichneumoninae from the Nearctic, Africa, Madagascar, Asia and the Palearctic. Moreover, most of them were described based on his own collections. Therefore, the taxa described by him can be called “discovered” or “new to science”. Heinrich's major publications are:

- Die Ichneumoninae von Celebes bearbeitet auf grund der ausbeute der Celebes expedition G. Heinrich 1930–1932 (1934, 265 pages, 7 plates of figures),
- Les Ichneumonides de Madagascar (1938, 1139 pages, 6 plates),
- Synopsis of Nearctic Ichneumoninae Stenopneusticae with particular reference to the Northeastern Region (Hymenoptera) (1961–1962, 7 volumes, 886 pages, numerous illustrations),
- Burmesische Ichneumoninae (1965–70, 10 parts, 457 pages),
- Synopsis and reclassification of the Ichneumoninae of Africa south of the Sahara (1967–68, 5 volumes, 1,258 pages, numerous text figures),
- Ichneumoninae of Florida and Neighboring States (Hymenoptera: Ichneumonidae, subfamily Ichneumoninae) (1977, 350 pages, 8 color plates and numerous text figures).

Heinrich also wrote travelogues about his expeditions to Celebes (1932), Burma (1940), and Persia (1933).

The Heinrich collections are curated in Warsaw (C. G. H. I), Poland (Instytut Zoologiczny, Polska Akademia Nauk), Munich (C. G. H. II), Germany (Zoologische Staatssammlung München), the collection of H. Townes (Gensville, Florida) and partially (species from Madagascar and some others) in the Museum für Naturkunde, Humboldt-Universität zu Berlin.

== Entomological publications ==
=== 1920s ===
- 1925. Larva Nematus crassus Fall. - Die Larve von Nematus crassus Fall. Ann. Zool. Mus. Polonici, 4:324-325.
- 1925. Die Larve von Nematus crassus Fall. (Hym. Tenthred.). Deutsche Ent. Zeitschr., 1925:288.
- 1926. Beitraege zur Kenntnis der Ichneumonidenfauna Polens. Polskiego Pisma Ent., 5:153-166. PDF
- 1926. Zur Systematik der Ichneumoninae stenopneusticae (Hym.). Deutsche Ent. Zeitschr., 1926:255-259. PDF
- 1926. Beitrage zur Kenntnis der Ichneumonidenfauna der Dobrudscha (Hym.). Deutsche Ent. Zeitschr., 1926: 397-400. PDF
- 1926. Beitrage zur Ichneumonidenfauna Polens. I. Nachtrag. (Ichneumoninae u. Pimplinae). Polskiego Pisma Ent., 6:249-250. PDF
- 1926 Ctenamblyteles nom. nov. (Hym. Ichneum.). Deutsche Ent. Zeitschr., 1928: 141. PDF
- 1928. Zur Systematik der Ichneumonidae. I. Konowia, 7:199-202. PDF
- 1928. Die Kennzeichen der Ichneumoninen auf ihren arttrennenden Wert. (Hym.). Konowia, 7: 203-213. PDF
- 1928. Einige seltene, neue oder bisher in beiden Geschlechtern noch nicht bekannte Ichneumoniden (Hym.). Deutsche Ent. Zeitschr., 1928: 86-90. PDF
- 1929. Beitrag zur Kenntnis der Ichneumonidenfauna der Transsylvanischen Alpen und Siebenbiirgens. Polskiego Pisma Ent., 7:174-179 (1928). PDF
- 1929. Beitrage zur Systematik der Ichneumoninae. Konowia, 8:13-17. PDF
- 1929. Beitrage zur Kenntnis der Insektenfauna Nordpersiens. Deutsche Ent. Zeitschr., 1929:305-326. PDF
- 1929. Bemerkungen fiber die Ichneumoninae in Brischkes Sammlung zu Danzig. Konowia, 8: 7-8. PDF
- 1929. Die Wirte einiger Ichneumoniden. Konowia, 8:319-321. PDF
- 1929. Meniscus Tolli n. sp. Polskiego Pisma Ent., 7:179-80 (1928). PDF
- 1929. Trematopygus romani n. sp. (Hym. Ichneum.). Deutsche Ent. Zeitschr., 1929:284.

=== 1930s ===
- 1930. Einige neue Genera und Species der Subfam. Ichneumoninae Ashm. Mitt Zool. Mus. Berlin, 15: 543-555. PDF
- 1930. Zur Systematik der Ichneumoninae stenopneusticae II. Konowia, 9:8-12. PDF
- 1930. Zur Systematik der Ichneumoninae stenopneusticae III. Konowia, 9:90-92. PDF
- 1930. Beitrag zur Kenntnis der Ichneumonidenfauna Jugoslaviens. Konowia, 9: 118-126. PDF
- 1931. Beitrage zur Systematik der Ichneumoninae stenopneusticae (Hym.) IV. Mitt. Deutsche Ent. Gesell., 2:27-32. PDF
- 1931. Zur Systematik der Ichneumoninae stenopneusticae IV [actually V]. Konowia, 10: 29-33. http://tereshkin.info/h23.pdf
- 1931. [R. Mell & Heinrich], Beitrage zur Fauna sinica IX. Zur Biologie und Systematik der sfidchinesischen Ichneumoninae Ashm. (Fam. Ichneumonidae Hym.). Zeitschr. Angew. Ent., 18:371-403. http://tereshkin.info/h24.pdf
- 1933. Anisobas brombacheri spec. nov. (Hym. Ichneum.). Mitt. Deutsche Ent.Ht, Gesell, 4:54. PDF
- 1933. Zur Systematik der Ichneumoninae stenopneusticae VI. Mitt. Zool. Mus. Berlin, 19:154-165. PDF
- 1934. Die Ichneumoninae von Celebes bearbeitet auf grand der ausbeute der Celebes expedition G. Heinrich * 1930-1932. Mitt. Zool. Mus. Berlin, 20: 1-263. PDF
- 1935. Zur Systematik der Ichneumoninae stenopneusticae VII. Deutsche Ent. Zeitschr., 1935:191-200. PDF
- 1936. Ichneumoninae Podola. Polskie Pismo Ent, 13:21-42 (1934). PDF
- 1936. Die von mir in Bulgarien gesammelten Ichneumoninae und Cryptinae (Insecta, Hymenoptera). Mitt. Königl. Naturwiss. Inst. Sofia, 9: 81-88. PDF
- 1936. Hymenoptera III. Ichneumonidae: Ichneumoninae. Mission Scientifique de l'Omo. Mus. Natl. Hist. Nat. Paris, Zoologie, 3 (28): 227-244 (1935). PDF
- 1937. Ichneumonologische Notizen. Deutsche Wiss. Zeitschr. f. Polen Jub. Deutsch. Naturw. Ver Poznar, 32: 57-59. PDF
- 1937. Zwei neue Formen des Subgen. Meringopus Forst. und ein neuer Acroricnus (Hym, Ichn. Cryptinae). Mitt. Deutschen Ent. Gesell, 8: 22-24.
- 1937. A List and Some Notes on the Synonymy of the Types of the Subfamily Ichneumoninae Ashmead (Hymenoptera) in the Collections of the British Museum and the Hope Department of the Oxford University Museum. Ann. & Mag. Nat. Hist., (10) 20: 257-279. PDF
- 1937. Zur Systematik der Ichneumoninae stenopneusticae VIII (Hym.). Mitt. Deutschen Ent. Gesell, 8: 51-54. PDF
- 1937. Das Genus Rhynchobanchus Kriechb. und seine europaischen Vertreter. Archiv f. Naturgesch. (N.F.), 6: 663-667.
- 1937. Ichneumoninae Pokucia. Polskie Pismo Ent, 14-15:122-143 (1935–36). PDF
- 1937. Gibbonota duplanae gen. et sp. nov. (Pimplinae, Lissonotini). Polskie Pismo Ent, 14-15: 364-365.
- 1938. Les Ichneumonidae de Madagascar. III. Ichneumonidae, Ichneumoninae. Mem. Acad. Malagache, 25:1-139. PDF

=== 1940s ===
- 1944. Ichneumoninae Niederdonaus. Mitt. Deutschen Ent. Gesell, 13:108-113. PDF
- 1944. Eine neue Ichneumonine aus Deutschland. Mitt. Deutschen Ent. Gesell, 13: 113-115. PDF
- 1944. Eine seltene Schlupfwespe aus Schwaben. p. 95.
- 1949. Stenichneumon ceaurei spec. nov. Mitt. Sammelstelle f. Schmarotzer. des V.D.E.V., 24:1. PDF
- 1949. Ichneumoniden des Berchtesgadener Gebietes (Hym.). Mitt. Munchner Ent.Gesell, 35-39 (1945–49): 1-101. PDF
- 1949. Neue und interessante Schlupfwespen aus Bayern (Hym.). Mitt. Munchner Ent. Gesell, 35-39 (1945–49): 101-127. PDF
- 1949. (Hym. Ichneum.) Die Pterocorminae (Ichneumeoninae [sic]) der Hahnheide. Bombus, 59-60: 256-258. PDF

=== 1950s ===
- 1950. Eine neue Ichneumonidae aus der Ukraine. Naturwissen. Mus. Stadt. Aschaffenburg, Note no. 28:4-6.
- 1950. Neue Deutsche Ichneumoniden. Naturwissen. Mus. Stadt Aschaffenburg, Note no. 28:14-23. PDF
- 1951. Xorides holsaticus spec. nov. Naturwissen. Mus. Stadt. Aschaffenburg, Note no. 30: 47-49.
- 1951. Beitrage zur Kenntnis der Ichneumoninae. Naturwissen. Mus. Stadt Aschaffenburg, Note no. 31:27-32. PDF
- 1951. Barichneumon tegelensis spec. nov. Entomologische Berichten, no.316: 351. PDF
- 1951-53. Ichneumoniden der Steiermark (Hym.) [I and II], Bonner Zool. Beitrage, 2 (Heft 3-4): 235-290,1951; 4(Heftl-2): 147-185,1953. PDF
- 1952. Ichneumonidae from the Allgau, Bavaria. Ann. & Mag. Nat. Hist., (12) 5: 1052-1089. PDF
- 1953. Deutung einiger Typen Strobls und Arten seiner Sammlung (Hymenopt.). Zeitschr. Wiener Ent. Gesell., 38: 206-211. PDF
- 1953. Holarctic elements among the Ichneumoninae of Maine. J. Washington Acad. Sci., 43:148-150. PDF
- 1956. A Report on Some North American Arctic and Subarctic Ichneumoninae. Canad. Ent., 88:447-487. PDF
- 1956.. Holarctic Elements Among the Ichneumoninae of Canada. Canad. Ent., 88: 647-652. PDF
- 1956. Ichneumon lariae Curtis A Critical Study on this Arctic Species and its Closely Related Forms. Canad. Ent, 88:686-691. PDF
- 1957. Einige Ichneumoninae von Afghanistan. Ent. Zeitschr, 67: 20-24. PDF
- 1957. A New Species of the Tribe Trogini (Hymenoptera: Ichneumonidae). Canad. Ent, 89: 334. PDF
- 1957. [Heinrich & V. K. Gupta]. Entomological Survey of the Himalaya Part 20- On a Collection of Ichneumonidae (Parasitic Hymenoptera) from the North-West Himalaya. Agra Univ. J. Res. (Sci.), 5:367-368 (1956).
- 1958. A Report on Some North American Arctic and Subarctic Ichneumoninae. First Supplement. Canad. Ent, 90:739-741. PDF
- 1959. Ichneumon canadensis Cress. Selection of New Lectotype. Ent. News, 60: 204.
- 1959. Revisional Notes on the Types of Ichneumoninae of Cresson, Cushman, Ashmead and Others. Ent. News, 70: 205-217. PDF
- 1959. "Trogus" atrocoeruleus Cresson, a Rediscovery and Redescription (Hymenoptera, Ichneumonidae). Proc. Ent. Soc. Washington, 61: 199- 200.
- 1959. Revisional Notes on the Provancher Types of Ichneumoninae (Hymenoptera). Canad. Ent, 91: 806-807. PDF

=== 1960s ===
- 1960. New Oriental Trogini (Hymenoptera: Ichneumonidae). Canad. Ent, 92:107-109. http://tereshkin.info/h66.pdf
- 1961-62. Synopsis of Nearctic Ichneumoninae Stenopneusticae with Particular Reference to the Northeastern Region (Hymenoptera) In 8 parts, 886 pages as under:
- Part I Introduction, Key to Nearctic Genera of Ichneumoninae Stenopneusticae, and Synopsis of the Protichneumonini North of Mexico. Canad. Ent. Suppl, 15:1-87 (1960). Accompanied Vol. 92. PDF
- Part II Synopsis of the Ichneumonini: Genera Orgichneumon, Cratichneumon, Homotherus, Aculichneumon, Spilichneumon. Canad. Ent. Suppl, 18: 89-205 (1960). Accompanied Vol. 92. PDF
- Part III Synopsis of the Ichneumonini: Genera Ichneumon and Thyrateles. Canad. Ent. Suppl, 21:207-368. Accompanied Vol. 93. PDF
- Part IV Synopsis of the Ichneumonini: Genera Chasmias, Neamblymorpha, Anisopygus, Limerodops, Eupalamus, Tricholabus, Pseudamblyteles, Eutanyacra, Ctenichneumon, Exephanes, Ectopimorpha, Pseudoamblyteles. Canad. Ent. Suppl, 23:369-505. PDF
- Part V Synons of the Ichneumonini: Genera Protopelmus, Patrocloides, Probolus, Stenichneumon, Aoplus, Limonethe, Hybophorellus, Rubicundiella, Melanichneumon, Stenobarichneumon, Plalylabops, Hoplismenus, Hemihoplis, Trogomorpha. Canad. Ent. Suppl, 26: 507-671. PDF
- Part VI Synopsis of the Ichneumonini (Genus Plagiotrypes), Acanthojoppini, Listrodromini and Platylabini. Canad. Ent. Suppl, 27: 675-802. PDF
- Part VII Synopsis of the Trogini, Addenda and Corrigenda. Canad. Ent. Suppl, 29: 803-886. PDF
- A last part VIII was written by Oswald Peck in 1964. Part VIII Addenda and Corrigenda, Host-Parasite List and Generic Host Indes, Index to Ichneumonid Names. Mem. Ent. Soc. Canada, 35: 887-926. [On page 926 actual dates of publications are mentioned]. PDF
- 1964. Festsetzung von Lectotypen einiger afrikanischer Species der Subfamilie Ichneumoninae. Ent. Tidskr, 85: 52-53. PDF
- 1965. Burmesische Ichneumoninae I. Ent. Tidskr, 86:74-130. PDF
- 1965. Burmesische Ichneumoninae II. Ent. Tidskr, 86:133-177. PDF
- 1966. Burmesische Ichneumoninae III [a], Ent. Tidskr, 87: 184-247. PDF
- 1967. Burmesische Ichneumoninae III [b], Ent. Tidskr, 88: 1-32. PDF
- 1967-68. Synopsis and Reclassification of the Ichneumoninae Stenopneusticae of Africa south of the Sahara (Hymenoptera). Monograph, Farmington State College Press, Maine, U.S.A. In 5 volumes with 1258 pages as under:
- Volume I. Introduction: Key to Tribes and Subtribes of Ichneumoninae Stenopneusticae; Synopsis of the Protichneumonini, Ceratojoppini, Ischnojoppini, Trogini. pp. 1–250, April 3, 1967. PDF
- Volume II. Synopsis of the Oedicephalini, Listrodromini, Compsophorini, Ctenocalini, Platylabini, Eurylabini, Acanthojoppini. pp. 251–480, June 28, 1967. PDF
- Volume III. Synopsis of the Ichneumonini: Subtribes Ichneumonina and Amblytelina. pp. 481–692, December 21, 1967.
- Volume IV. Synopsis of the Ichneumonini: Subtribes Aethioplitina and Cratichneumonina (in part). pp. 693–942, June 20, 1968.
- Volume V. Synopsis of the Ichneumonini: Subtribe Cratichneumonina, Addenda and Index. pp. 943–1258, November 10, 1968. [On the last page actual dates of publication (in Germany) of various parts are given; actual receipt of the various parts was delayed somewhat in shipment].
- 1968. Burmesische Ichneumoninae IV. Ent. Tidskr, 89: 77-106. PDF
- 1968. Burmesische Ichneumoninae V. Ent. Tidskr, 89: 197-228. PDF
- 1968. Contributions to the Knowledge of North American Ichneumoninae. Naturaliste Canadien, 95: 703-722. PDF
- 1969. Synopsis of Nearctic Ichneumoninae Stenopneusticae with Particular Reference to the Northeastern Region (Hymenoptera) - Supplement 1. Naturaliste Canadien, 96: 935-963. PDF
- 1969. The Charcoal Digger Wasp, Isodontia pelopoeiformis. Florida Ent, 52 (2).
- 1969. Burmesische Ichneumoninae VI. Ent. Tidskr, 90:100-130. PDF

=== 1970s ===
- 1970. Burmesische Ichneumoninae VII. Ent. Tidskr, 91: 68-102. PDF
- 1971. Synopsis of Nearctic Ichneumoninae Stenopneusticae with Particular Reference to the Northeastern Region (Hymenoptera) Supplement 2. Naturaliste Canadien, 98: 959-1026. PDF
- 1972. Synopsis of Nearctic Ichneumoninae Stenopneusticae with Particular Reference to the Northeastern Region (Hymenoptera). Supplement 3. Naturaliste Canadien, 99:173-211. PDF
- 1972. Zur Systematik der Ichneumoninae Stenopneusticae IX. Eine Spatlese (Hymenoptera, Ichneumonidae). Mitt. Munchner Ent. Gesell, 60: 80- 101. PDF
- 1973. Bemerkenswerte Ichneumoninae aus dem Gebiet der Sudalpen. Nachricht. Bayer. Ent, 22:49-56. PDF
- 1973. Synopsis of Nearctic Ichneumoninae Stenopneusticae with Particular Reference to the Northeastern Region (Hymenoptera). Supplement 4. Naturaliste Canadien, 100: 461-465. An erratum published in vol. 100, no. 6, page 541 or 542. PDF
- 1974. Burmesische Ichneumoninae VIII. Ann. Zool. (Polska Akad. Nauk), 31 (5): 407-457. PDF
- 1974. Burmesische Ichneumoninae IX. Ann. Zool. (Polska Akad. Nauk), 32 (8): 103-197. PDF
- 1975. Burmesische Ichneumoninae X. Ann. Zool. (Polska Akad. Nauk), 32 (20): 441-514. PDF
- 1975. Synopsis of Nearctic Ichneumoninae Stenopneusticae with Particular Reference to the Northeastern Region (Hymenoptera). Supplement 5: Ichneumoninae of the Island of Newfoundland. Naturaliste Canadien, 102: 753-782. PDF
- 1977. Ichneumoninae of Florida and Neighboring States (Hymenoptera: Ichneumonidae, subfamily Ichneumoninae). Vol. 9 in Arthropods of Florida and Neighboring Land Areas, Florida Dept. of Agriculture & Consumer Services. pp. 1–350. PDF
- 1978. Synopsis of Nearctic Ichneumoninae Stenopneusticae, with Particular Reference to the Northeastern Region (Hymenoptera). Supplement 6. Naturaliste Canadien, 105:159-168. [http://tereshkin.info/h103a.pdf PDF
- 1978. Eastern Palearctic Ichneumoninae. A selection of new discoveries and critical taxonomical discussion, with particular reference to the Asiatic fauna of the USSR and the fauna of Turkey. In Russian. 80 pages. Published by the Institute of Zoology, Academy of Sciences, USSR. [http://tereshkin.info/h103a.pdf PDF

=== 1980s ===
- 1980. Neue Ichneumoninae Stenopneusticae aus der Palaearktischen Region (Hymenoptera, Ichneumonidae). Mitt. Munchner Ent. Gesell, 69: 9-27. PDF
- 1980. Burmesische Ichneumoninae XI. Ann. Zool. (Polska Akad. Nauk), 35 (11): 115-192. PDF
- 1980. Contribution to the knowledge of the Western Palearctic species of Anisobas Wesmael (Ichneumonidae, Ichneumoninae). Spixiana, 3: 225-238. [May have been published in 1981]. PDF
