= Joseph Kriechbaumer =

German entomologist (1819–1902)

Joseph Kriechbaumer (21 March 1819, Tegernsee- 2 May 1902, Munich) was a German entomologist who specialised in Hymenoptera especially Ichneumonidae.

A Doctor of Philosophy, Kriechbaumer was Kurator (Director) of the Munich Natural History Museum (Zoologische Staatssammlung München). His son Anton Kriechbaumer (1849-1935) was also an entomologist.
