= Toichi Uchida =

Japanese entomologist (1898–1974)

Toichi Uchida (1898-1974) was a Japanese entomologist who described over 1000 new Ichneumonids and many new genera.

He studied entomology under Professor Matsumura Matsutoshi at the Faculty of Agriculture of Hokkaido University.

His zoological author abbreviation is Uchida. See e.g. Diphyus albicoxalis. This author abbreviation is shared with another Japanese zoologist, Tohru Uchida.

== See also ==
- Category:Taxa named by Toichi Uchida
