= Goethe at the Window =

1786/7 watercolour by Johann Heinrich Wilhelm Tischbein

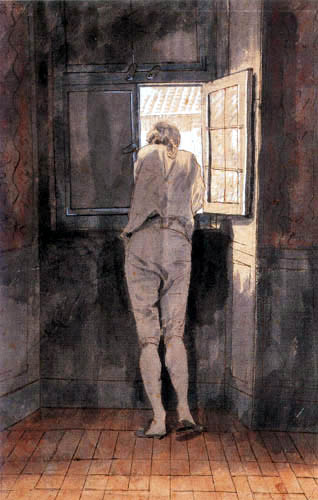
Goethe am Fenster, Johann Heinrich Wilhelm Tischbein

Goethe at the Window is a 1786/7 watercolour by German painter Johann Heinrich Wilhelm Tischbein. It depicts the poet Johann Wolfgang von Goethe looking out of the window of the apartment in Rome he shared with the artist.

The watercolour has been in the collection of the Freies Deutsches Hochstift since 1955.

== Background ==
Tischbein moved to Italy in 1783, after receiving a stipendium from Duke Ernst II of Saxe-Gotha-Altenburg on the recommendation of Goethe. He remained there until 1799, and encountered Goethe upon the latter's "Italian Journey" of 1786–88. Tischbein shared a house on Rome's Via del Corso with the painters Friedrich Bury, Johann Heinrich Meyer, Johann Heinrich Lips and Johann Georg Schütz. Goethe lodged for over a year from October 1786 in the shared flat, which is now the Casa di Goethe museum. During this time, Tischbein made the Goethe at the Window watercolour and painted his more famous work Goethe in the Roman Campagna.

From studying the layout of the flat in Via del Corso, it has been deduced that this drawing depicts Goethe in his bedroom, which overlooked the Via Fontanella.

== Sources ==
- Hennig, Mareike; Struck, Neela (2022). "Freiheit und Idealität - Schweiz und Italien". Zeichnen im Zeitalter Goethes (in German). Munich: Hirmer Verlag. ISBN 978-3-7774-3976-1.
- "J.H.W. Tischbeins biographische Daten". J.H.W. Tischbein (in German). Neumünster: Karl Wachholtz Verlag. 1986. pp. 251–255. ISBN 3-529-02545-3.
