= Italian Journey =

1816–17 book by Johann Wolfgang von Goethe

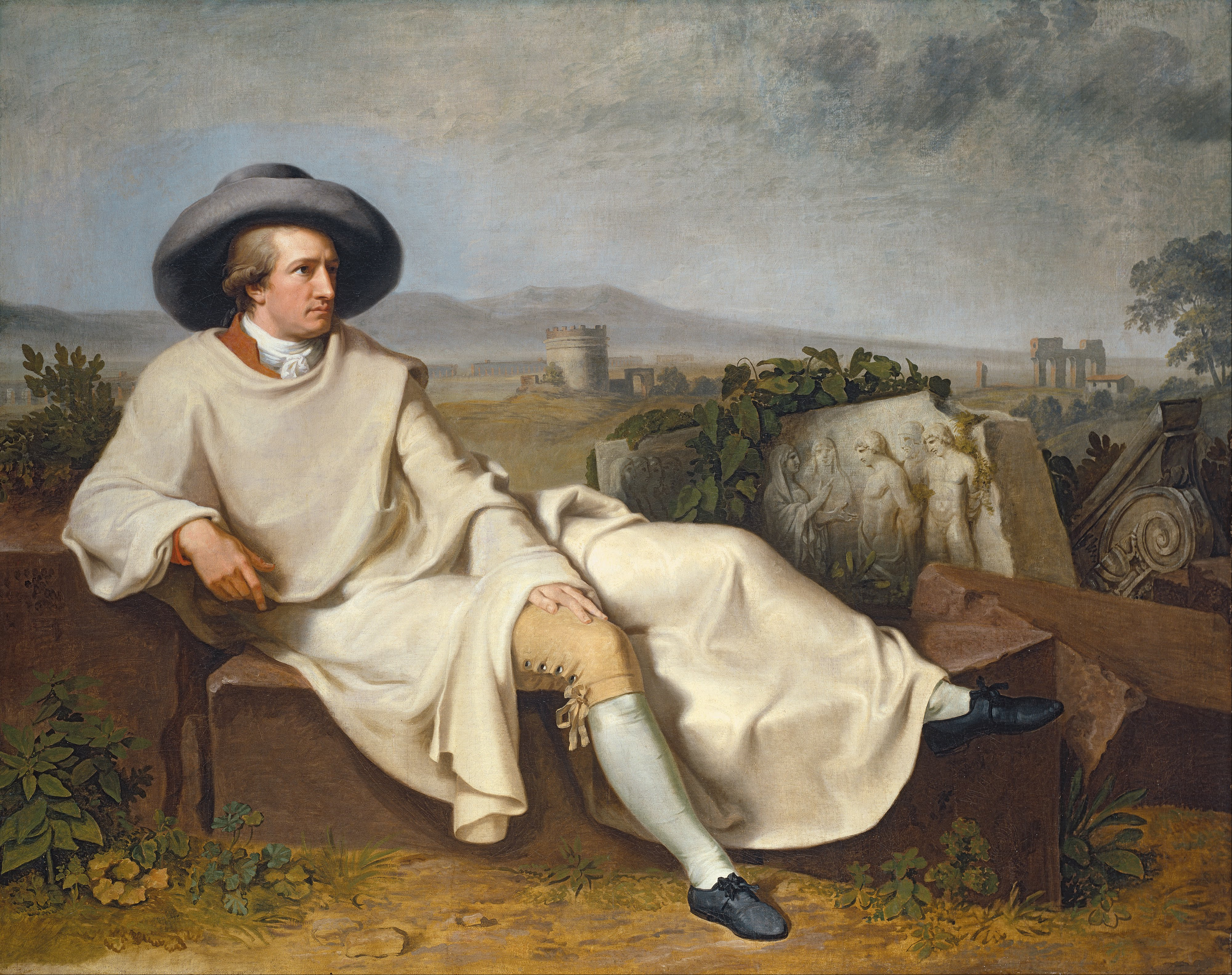
- Goethe in the Roman Campagna. by J. H. W. Tischbein (1787)
- Author: Johann Wolfgang von Goethe
- Language: German
- Genre: Essay, diary
- Publication date: 1816–17
- Publication place: Germany
- Media type: Print (hardcover and paperback)
- Dewey Decimal: 910
- LC Class: PT2027 .I7
- Preceded by: Zur Farbenlehre (in essays).
- Followed by: Über Kunst und Altertum (in essays).

Italian Journey (in the German original: Italienische Reise [itaˈli̯eːnɪʃə ˈʁaɪzə]) is Johann Wolfgang von Goethe's report on his travels to Italy from 1786 to 1788 that was published in 1816 & 1817. The book is based on Goethe's diaries and is smoothed in style, lacks the spontaneity of his diary report and is augmented with the addition of afterthoughts and reminiscences.

At the beginning of September 1786, when Goethe had just turned 37, he "slipped away," in his words, from his duties as Privy Councillor in the Duchy of Weimar, from a long platonic affair with a court lady and from his immense fame as the author of the novel The Sorrows of Young Werther and the stormy play Götz von Berlichingen, and he took what became a licensed leave of absence. He was able to persuade his employer, Duke Karl August, to agree to a paid absence.

By May 1788 he had travelled to Italy via Innsbruck and the Brenner Pass and visited Trento, Lake Garda, Verona, Vicenza, Padua, Venice, Bologna, Rome and Alban Hills, Naples and Sicily. He wrote many letters to a number of friends in Germany, which he later used as the basis for Italian Journey.

== Appraisal ==
Et in Arcadia ego

Italian Journey initially takes the form of a diary, with events and descriptions written up apparently quite soon after they were experienced. The impression is in one sense true, since Goethe was clearly working from journals and letters he composed at the time – and by the end of the book he is openly distinguishing between his old correspondence and what he calls reporting. But there is also a strong and indeed elegant sense of fiction about the whole, a sort of composed immediacy. Goethe said in a letter that the work was "both entirely truthful and a graceful fairy-tale." It had to be something of a fairy-tale, since it was written between thirty and more than forty years after the journey, in 1816 and 1828–29.

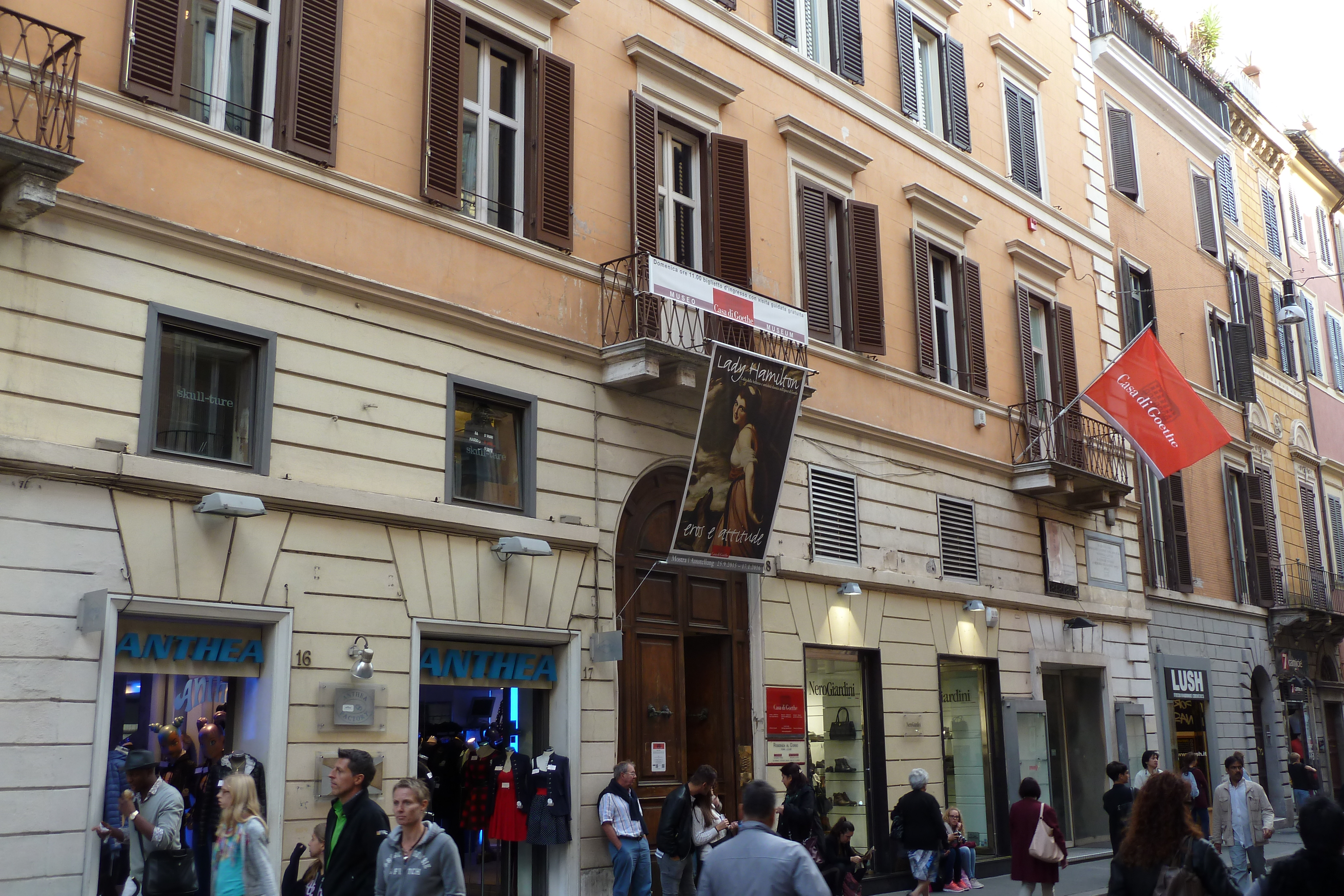
Casa di Goethe, once Tischbein's flat, today a museum on the Italian Journey in Via del Corso 18, Rome

The work begins with a famous Latin tag, Et in Arcadia ego, although originally Goethe used the German translation, Auch ich in Arkadien, which alters the meaning. This Latin phrase is usually imagined as spoken by Death – this is its sense, for example, in W. H. Auden's poem called "Et in Arcadia ego" – suggesting that every paradise is afflicted by mortality. Conversely, what Goethe's Auch ich in Arkadien says is "Even I managed to get to paradise," with the implication that we could all get there if we chose. If death is universal, the possibility of paradise might be universal too. This possibility wouldn't preclude its loss, and might even require it, or at least require that some of us should lose it. The book ends with a quotation from Ovid's Tristia, regretting his expulsion from Rome. Cum repeto noctem, Goethe writes in the middle of his own German, as well as citing a whole passage: "When I remember the night..." He is already storing up not only plentiful nostalgia and regret, but also a more complicated treasure: the certainty that he didn't merely imagine the land where others live happily ever after.

== Content ==
"We are all pilgrims who seek Italy," Goethe wrote in a poem two years after his return to Germany from his almost two-year spell in the land he had long dreamed of. For Goethe, Italy was the warm passionate south as opposed to the dank cautious north; the place where the classical past was still alive, although in ruins; a sequence of landscapes, colours, trees, manners, cities, monuments he had so far seen only in his writing. He described himself as "the mortal enemy of mere words" or what he also called "empty names." He needed to fill the names with meaning and, as he rather strangely put it, "to discover myself in the objects I see," literally "to learn to know myself by or through the objects." He also writes of his old habit of "clinging to the objects," which pays off in the new location. He wanted to know that what he thought might be paradise actually existed, even if it wasn't entirely paradise, and even if he didn't in the end want to stay there.

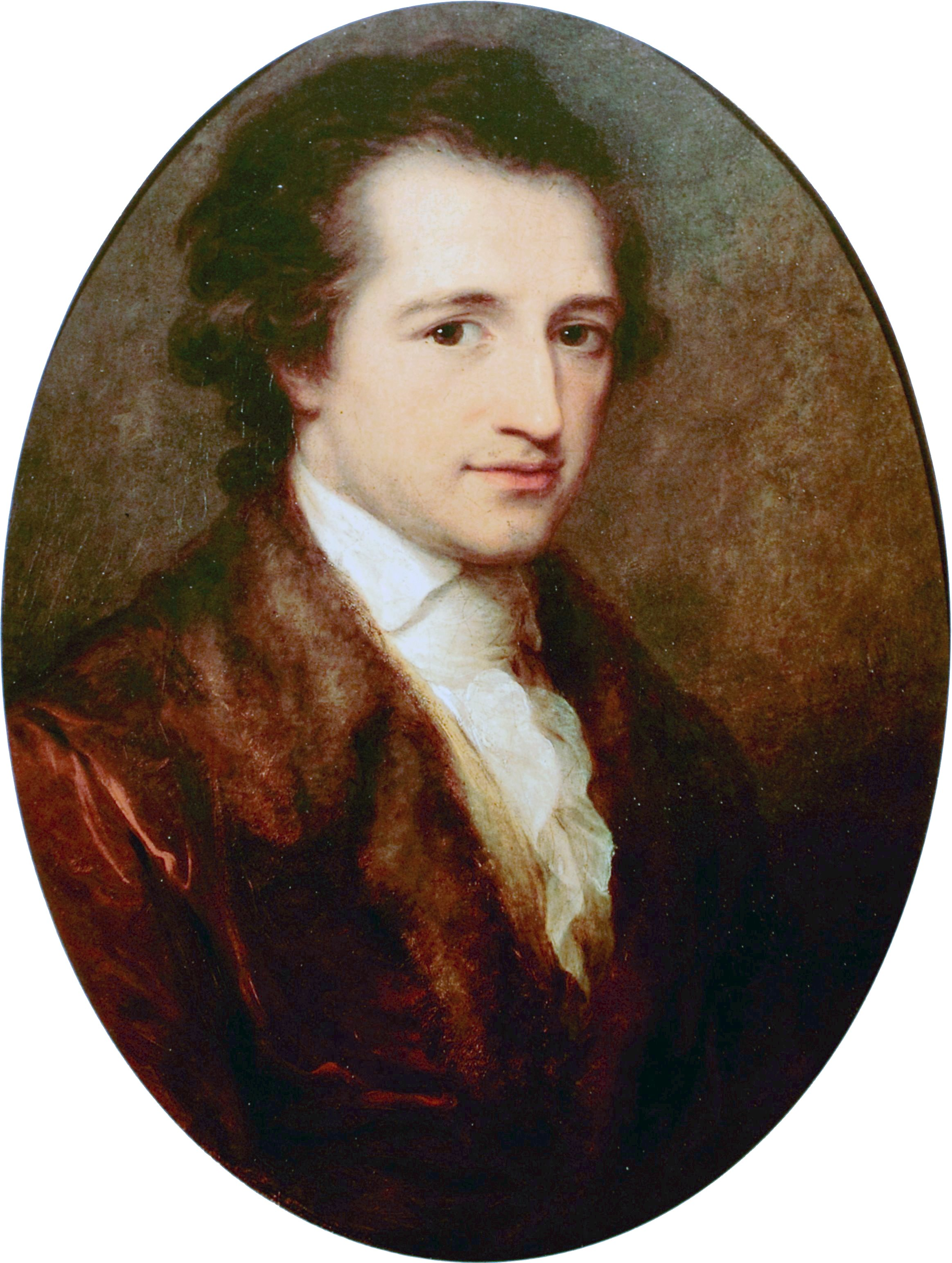
Portrait of Johann Wolfgang von Goethe by Angelica Kauffmann, 1787

While in Italy, Goethe aspired to witness and to breathe the conditions and milieu of a once highly – and in certain respects still – cultured area endowed with many significant works of art. Apart from the impetus to study the Mediterranean's natural qualities, he was first and foremost interested in the remains of classical antiquity, furthermore in Renaissance, but much less in the then predominant Baroque art. Medieval art he treated with complete contempt. During his stay in Assisi, he did not visit the famous Giotto frescoes in the Basilica of San Francesco d'Assisi. Many critics have questioned this strange choice. In Verona, where he enthusiastically commends the harmony and fine proportions of the city amphitheater, he asserts this is the first true piece of Classical art he has witnessed. Venice, too, holds treasures for his artistic education, and he soon becomes fascinated by the Italian style of living. He acquires Andrea Palladio's printed works and studies them intensively.

After a longer stop in Venice and a very short stop in Florence, he arrives in Rome. It was here that he met several respected German artists, and made friends with Johann Heinrich Wilhelm Tischbein and notable Neoclassical painter, Angelica Kauffman. He visited the famous art collections of Rome with her and her husband Antonio Zucchi. Other artists he frequently met were the painter Johann Friedrich Reiffenstein and the writer Karl Philipp Moritz.

Goethe lived with Tischbein in his flat in Via del Corso 18, Rome, today Casa di Goethe, a museum on the Italian Journey. He stayed there from October 1786 until February 1787 when they travelled together to Naples and Goethe went on to Sicily, and again from June 1787 until April 1788. Tischbein shared the house with a number of other German and Swiss painters. He painted one of the most famous portraits of Goethe, Goethe in the Roman Campagna. Goethe looked everywhere for ancient works of art, in museums and private collections, travelled twice to the Royal Palace of Portici where the excavations from Pompeii and Herculaneum were exhibited, he visited the Greek temples in Paestum several times. While Tischbein stayed in Naples looking for commissions, Goethe went on to Sicily with the German painter Christoph Heinrich Kniep. There he devoted himself intensively to the then largely unknown Greek ruins in Agrigento. In Palermo, Goethe searched for what he called Urpflanze, a plant that would be the archetype of all plants.

In his journal, Goethe shows a marked interest in the geology of Europe's southern regions. He demonstrates a depth and breadth of knowledge in each subject. Most frequently, he pens descriptions of mineral and rock samples that he retrieves from the mountains, crags, and riverbeds of Italy. He also undertakes several dangerous hikes to the summit of Mount Vesuvius, where he catalogues the nature and qualities of various lava flows and tephra. He is similarly adept at recognizing species of plant and flora, which stimulate thought and research into his botanical theories.

While more credibility can be attributed to his scientific investigations, Goethe maintains a thoughtful and admiring interest in art. Using Palladio and Johann Joachim Winkelmann as touchstones for his artistic growth, Goethe expands his scope of thought in regards to Classical concepts of beauty and the characteristics of good architecture. Indeed, in his letters he periodically comments on the growth and good that Rome has caused in him. The profusion of high-quality objects of art proves critical in his transformation during these two years away from his hometown in Germany.

=== Rome and Naples ===
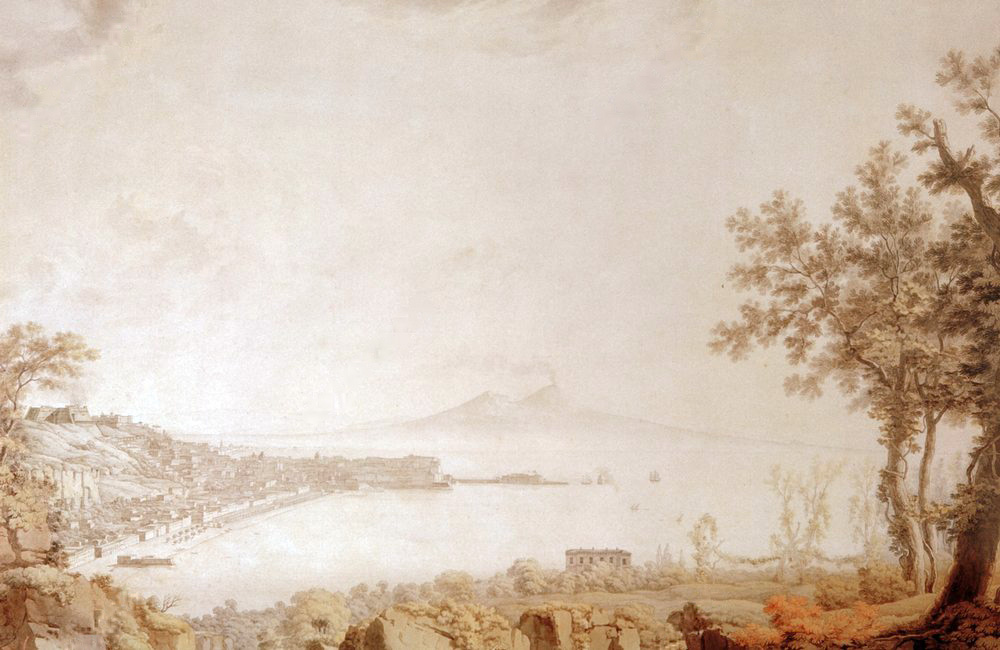
The Gulf of Naples with a view of Vesuvius, by Goethe's artist friend Christoph Heinrich Kniep

Goethe stayed almost three months in Rome, which he described as "the First City of the World." His company was a group of young German and Swiss painters lodging with Tischbein, Friedrich Bury, Johann Heinrich Meyer, Johann Heinrich Lips and Johann Georg Schütz. He sketched and did watercolours, experimented with modeling a head of Hercules and even shortly toyed with the idea of turning from a writer into a painter when he took painting lessons from Jakob Philipp Hackert in Naples. But he soon realized his limitations in this field. He visited famous sites, rewrote his play Iphigenia, and thought about his Collected Works, already in progress back home. He could look back now on what he called his "salto mortale" (somersault), his bid for freedom, and he had explained himself in letters to his mistress and friends. But he couldn't settle. Rome was full of remains, but too much was gone. "Architecture rises out of its grave like a ghost." All he could do was "revere in silence the noble existence of past epochs which have perished for ever." It is at this point, as Nicholas Boyle puts it clearly in the first volume of his biography, Goethe began to think of turning his "flight to Rome... into an Italian journey."

From February to May 1787 he was in Naples and Sicily. He climbed Vesuvius, visited Pompeii, found himself contrasting Neapolitan gaiety with Roman solemnity. He was amazed that people could actually live in the way he had only imagined living and in an emotional passage he wrote:

Naples is a paradise; everyone lives in a state of intoxicated self-forgetfulness, myself included. I seem to be a completely different person whom I hardly recognise. Yesterday I thought to myself: Either you were mad before, or you are mad now.

and about the sights:

One may write or paint as much as one likes, but this place, the shore, the gulf, Vesuvius, the citadels, the villas, everything, defies description.

I can't begin to tell you of the glory of a night by full moon when we strolled through the streets and squares to the endless promenade of the Chiaia, and then walked up and down the seashore. I was quite overwhelmed by the feeling of infinite space. To be able to dream like this is certainly worth the trouble it took to get here.

However, he does not indulge himself predominantly in literary reflections or thoughts on the classics of art. Instead, he observes his new surroundings closely. For example, he contradicts the German travel author Johann Jacob Volkmann who speaks of "thirty to forty thousand idlers" in Naples, by observing in detail what members of the lower classes deal with on a daily basis. He describes their diverse activities, including child labor, and sums up that he had noticed "a lot of ill-dressed people," but no unemployed ones. He expands observations of a year-round abundance of fruit, vegetables and fish into a historical comparison of the southern and northern peoples. The latter, due to climatic and agricultural conditions, were forced by nature in a completely different way to prepare for hard winters, which results in the “Nordic industry” being much more efficient. On the other hand, the Neapolitan poor understand at the same time “to enjoy the world at its best” – like all classes there “do not work in their own way just to live, but to enjoy, and that they even want to find happiness in their work." Basically, Goethe has a positive attitude towards the Italian mentality and art of living and hopes to be able to adopt some of them for himself and his future life in Weimar.

Unlike in Rome, Goethe, the ennobled ducal minister, tried not to withdraw from socializing in Naples. Rather, passed around by the philosopher Prince Gaetano Filangieri, he allowed himself to be invited to aristocratic palaces and socialized with the British ambassador Sir William Hamilton and his wife Lady Emma. In some places Goethe also inserts anecdotes, for example about Filangieri's unconventional sister who was married to the old prince Filippo Fieschi Ravaschieri and enjoyed offending his clerical guests, as Goethe describes with delight. Or about the tyrannical governor of Messina, whose lunch table, filled with dozens of guests, is not allowed to start until soldiers have searched the whole city for Goethe, who had innocently skipped the meal for sightseeing not aware he had the place of honor next to the governor.

After returning to Rome from Sicily via Naples in June 1787, Goethe decided, instead of returning home to Weimar as planned, to stay in Rome for another winter, which turned out to be almost a whole year. He delayed his departure until after Easter the following year and did not leave until April 1788. Besides Iphigenia, he also finished his play Egmont in September 1787.

== Epigraph ==
Some journeys – Goethe's was one – really are quests. Italian Journey is not only a description of places, persons and things, but also a psychological document of the first importance.

— W. H. Auden, Epigraph on Italian Journey

== Itinerary ==
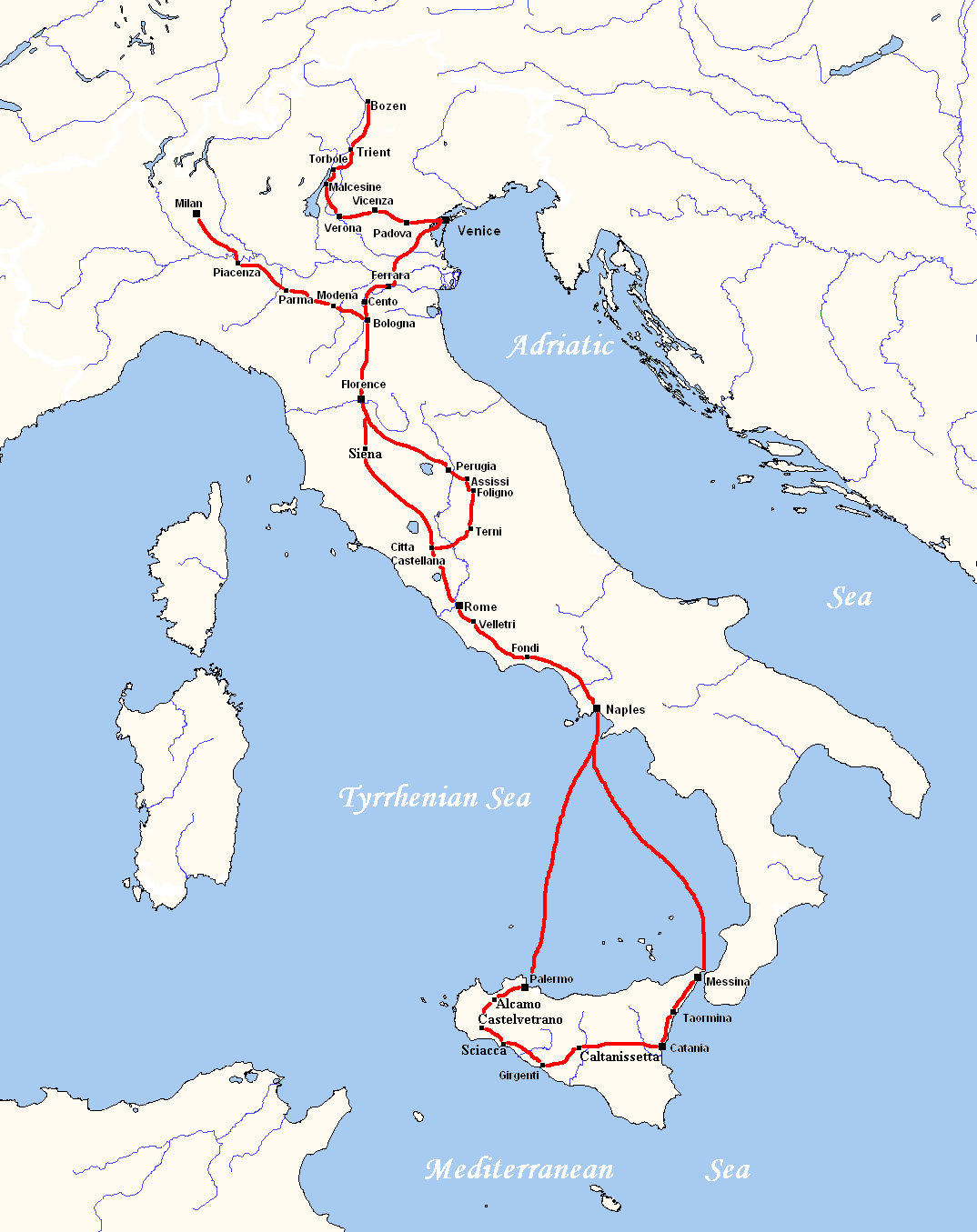
Goethe's Italian Journey between September 1786 and May 1788

The Italian Journey is divided sequentially as follows:

Part One

- September 1786: from Karlsbad (now Karlovy Vary in the Czech Republic) to the Brenner.
- --, from the Brenner to Verona, via Bolzano, Trento, Torbole, Malcesine.
- --, from Verona to Venice, via Vicenza, Padua.
- October 1786: Venice.
- --, from Ferrara to Rome, via Cento, Bologna, Florence, Perugia, Assisi, Foligno, Terni, Civita Castellana.
- November 1786-February 1787: first Roman visit.

Part Two

- February–March 1787: Naples, via Velletri, Fondi.
- March–May 1787: Sicily, including Palermo, Alcamo, Castelvetrano, Sciacca, Agrigento (Girgenti), Caltanisetta, Catania, Taormina, Messina.
- May–June 1787: Naples.

Part Three: June 1787-April 1788: second Roman visit.

== Gallery, Goethe at Malcesine ==
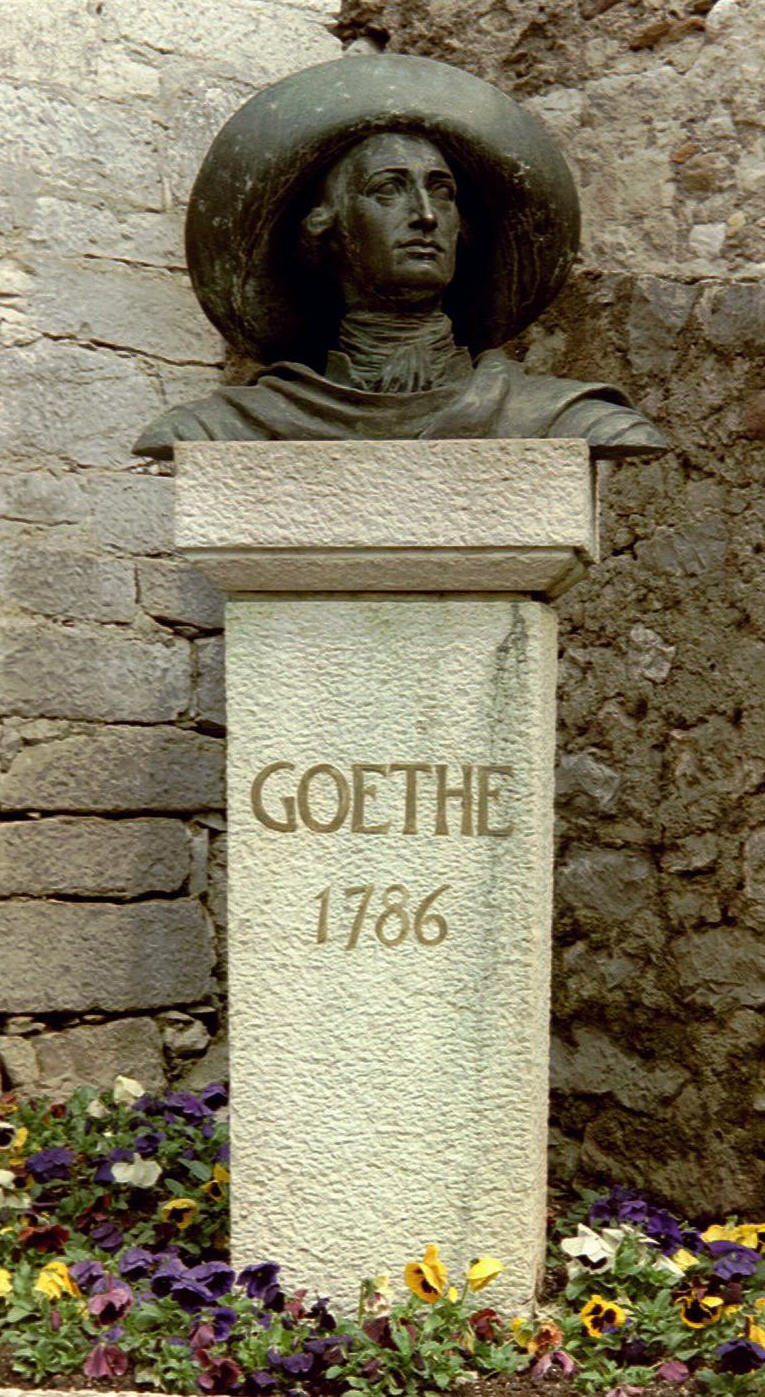
Goethe's Herma in the courtyard of the Scaliger Castle in Malcesine, a place he visited in 1786, during his Italian journey.

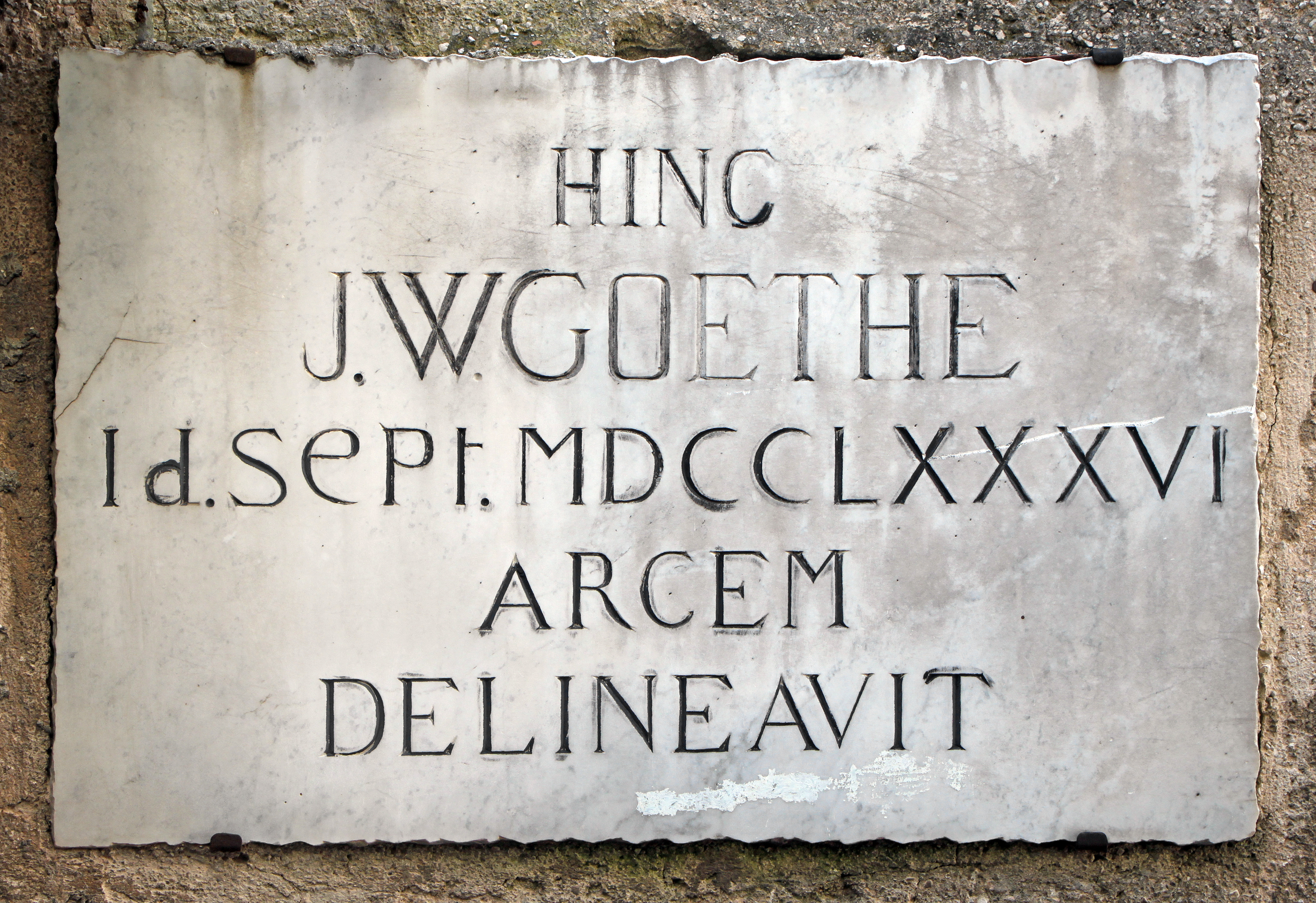
"At this place J. W. Goethe drew the castle on September 14, 1786": Plaque in the Via Castello, Malcesine, where Goethe was drawing the castle.

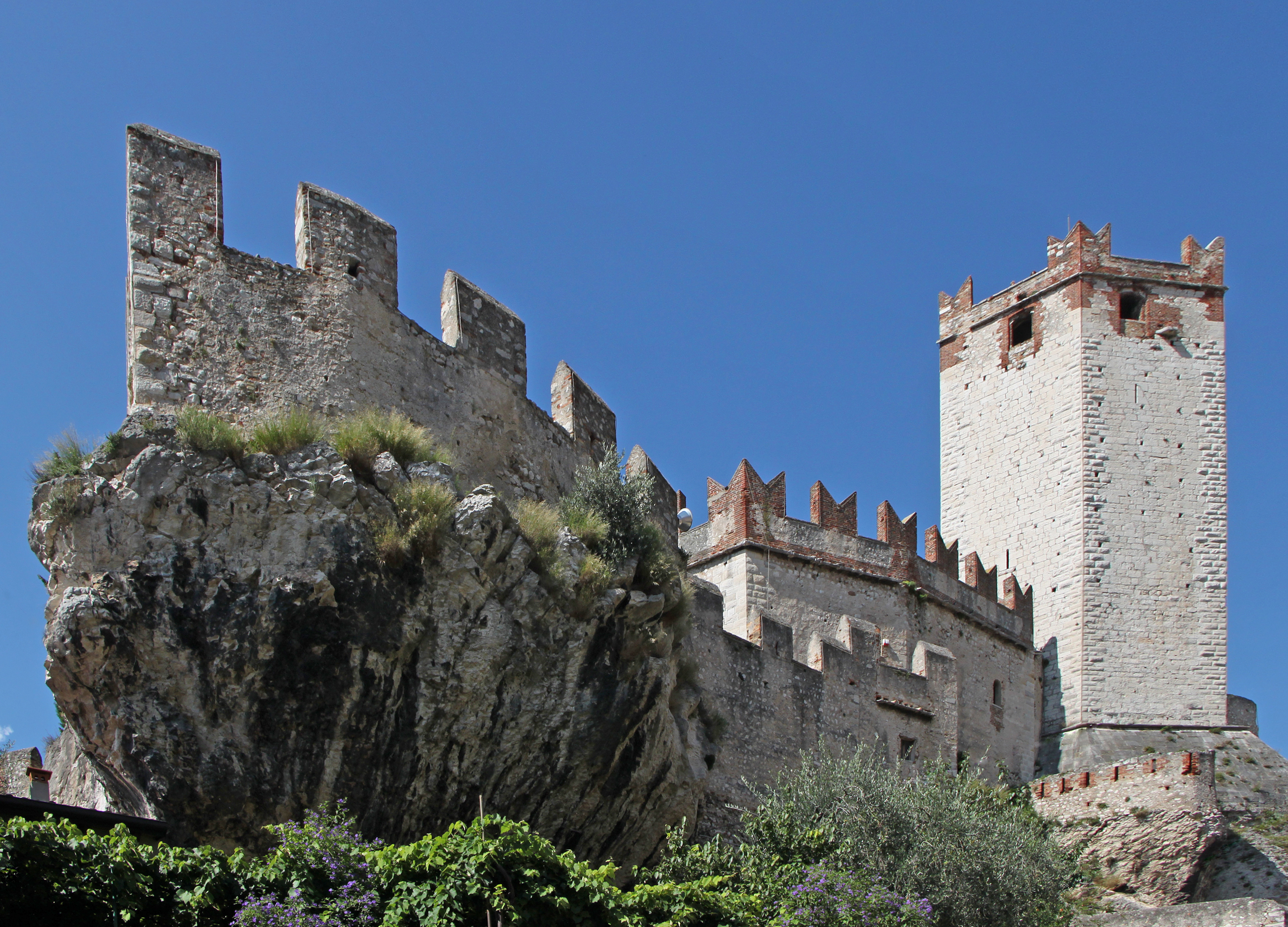
Goethe's view of Castello Scaligero, when interrupted as he described in Italian Journey (click on image for quotation).

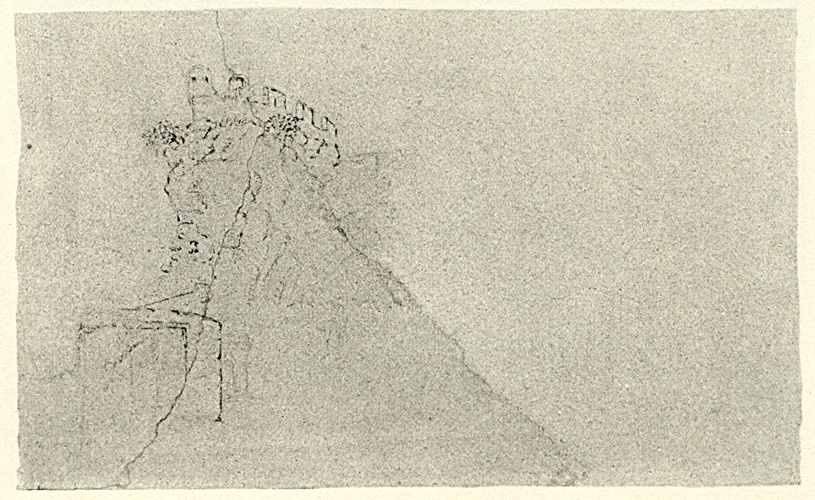
Goethe's drawing of Castello Scaligero, torn in the incident described in Italian Journey.

== Reception ==
The reception of Goethe's Italian journey did not begin with the much later publication of his travel diaries from 1813 to 1817. It begins on the journey itself, especially since Goethe tried to let his friends in Weimar share his experiences by means of numerous letters, not least Duke Carl August, who ultimately continued to pay him his salary as a privy councilor and thus made the journey economically possible in the first place. Goethe repeatedly emphasized in his letters how much the artistic impressions of Italy inspired his own artistic work, repeatedly spoke of a "rebirth", a "new youth" and tried to justify the increasing length of his absence. He regularly sends home newly-made manuscripts to demonstrate his continued production. The Italian journey was also the subject of correspondence with friends in Italy after Goethe's return to Weimar (published in 1890 by Otto Harnack). The journey to Italy by Duchess Anna Amalia from 1788 to 1790 was also inspired by Goethe's letters.

One result of his trip was that after his return to Weimar he separated his poetic from his political existence by asking the duke to release him from many of his previous duties so that he could do “what no one but I can do, and let other people do the rest".

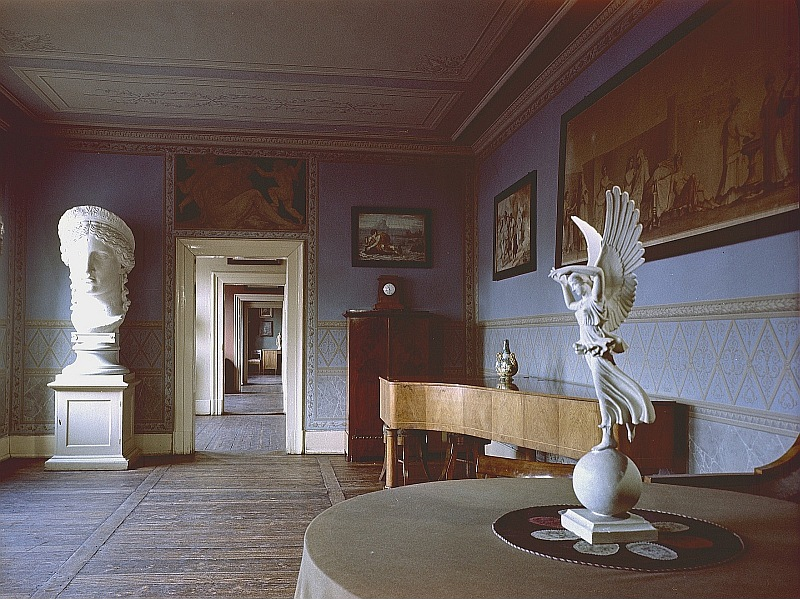
Room in Goethe's house in Weimar

The poet himself remained inspired by his travel impressions throughout his life. Goethe's house in Weimar is filled with antique works of art and pictures that allude to Italy, as was his parents' house in Frankfurt, since his father Johann Caspar Goethe had brought numerous copper engravings back from a trip to Italy between 1740 and 1741; the father had also written a travel book (in Italian). The Weimar staircase is modeled on Italian palazzi with antique plaster casts and reliefs, as well as charcoal drawings of the Elgin Marbles. The Park an der Ilm is filled with a staffage building based on a Roman country house drawn by Goethe, a pompeian bench or the cast of a sacrificial altar from Herculaneum.

What does not appear in the book are the numerous erotic experiences that Goethe was able to have in Italy, for example with his Roman lover Faustina. However, a few weeks after his return, on July 12, 1788, in Weimar, Goethe made the acquaintance of the 23-year-old milliner Christiane Vulpius, whom he made his lover, and soon afterwards his partner (and eventually his wife). However, his Roman Elegies with numerous erotic allusions were written at that time.
