= Casa di Goethe =

Museum in Rome

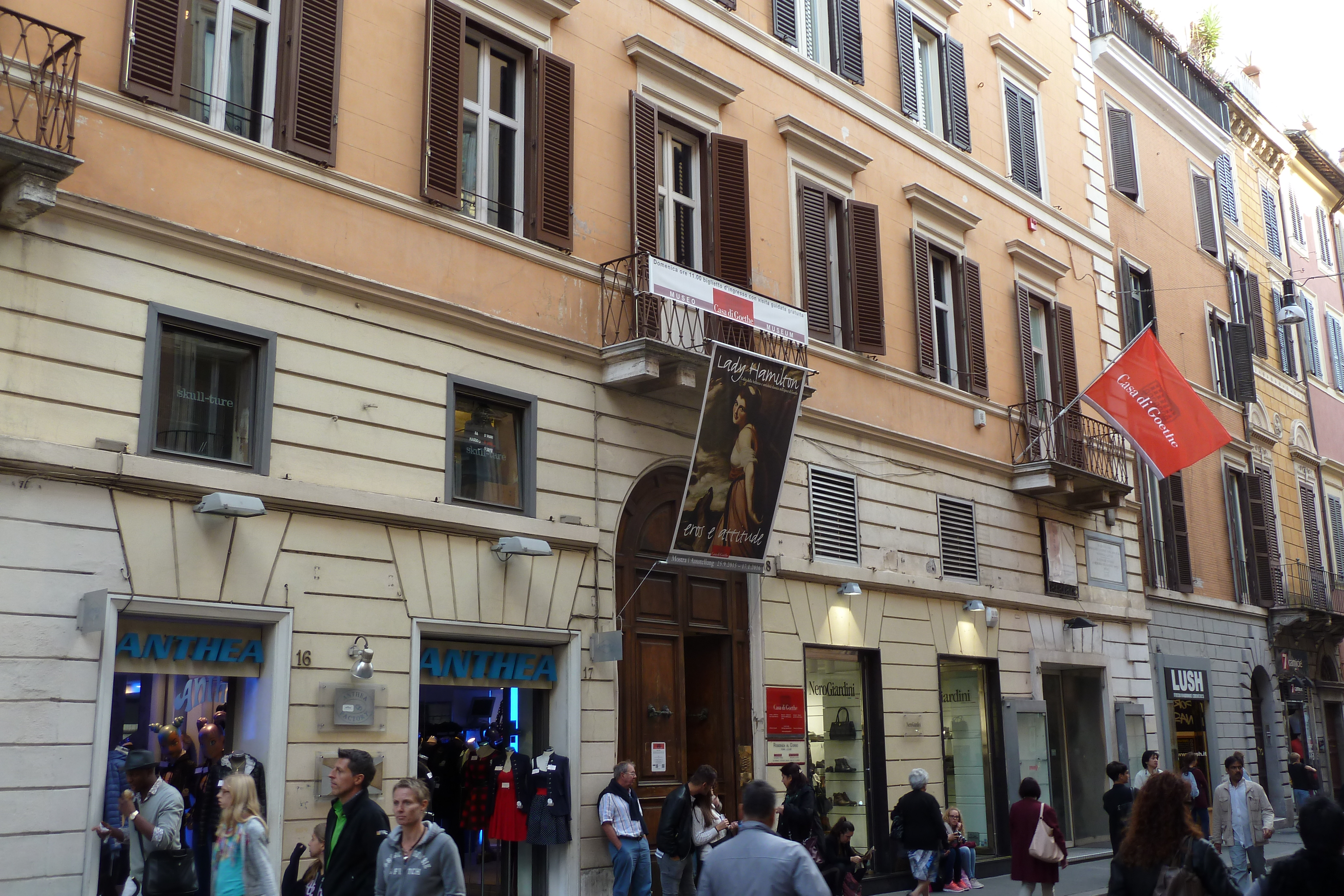
- View of the building in Via del Corso No. 18. The Casa di Goethe is located on the first floor.
- Click on the map for a fullscreen view
- Coordinates: 41°54′32″N 12°28′38″E

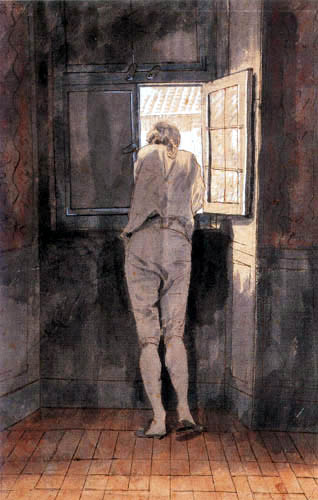
Tischbein: Goethe at the window of Tischbein's flat in Rome (1787)

The Casa di Goethe is a museum in Rome, in Via del Corso 18, dedicated to Johann Wolfgang von Goethe, his Italian Journey and his life at Rome in the years from 1786 through 1788. During his journey Goethe wrote a journal and also many letters which would be published in 1816-17 as the Italian Journey.

== Description and history ==
The museum is located in the house and in the same rooms in which Goethe lived with his friend the German painter Johann Heinrich Wilhelm Tischbein during his stay in Rome from October 1786 until February 1787 when they travelled together to Naples and Goethe went on to Sicily, and again from June 1787 until April 1788. Tischbein shared the house with other German and Swiss painters, Friedrich Bury, Johann Heinrich Meyer, Johann Heinrich Lips and Johann Georg Schütz. Other artists who lived in Rome and frequently visited Goethe here were painters Angelica Kauffman, her husband Antonio Zucchi and Johann Friedrich Reiffenstein as well as the writer Karl Philipp Moritz.

When Tischbein finally moved to Naples in the summer of 1787, Goethe moved into his spacious painting studio for the rest of his stay. He continued to study the ancient and Renaissance art of Rome and tried his hand at draftsmanship, painting and sculpting. He also continued to work on his theater play Iphigenia in Tauris (which he finished here), furthermore resumed his work on Torquato Tasso, Egmont and Faust.

== Exhibition ==
The permanent exhibition covers his life in Italy, his work and writing, and also about his private life and shows original documents concerning his life. The second exhibition, which is always a temporary exhibition, often refers to arguments and themes which connect somehow the Italian and German cultures or talks about artists like Max Beckmann, Heinrich Mann and Thomas Mann, Andreu Alfaro, Günter Grass and Johann Gottfried Schadow and their experiences in Italy as well as their examinations of Goethe. The museum owns a library, which includes also the collection of Richard W. Dorn.

The Casa di Goethe, opened in 1997 and is administrated by the Association of Independent Cultural Institutes (AsKI) and directed by Ursula Bongaerts.

Preceded by Capitoline Museums	Landmarks of Rome; Casa di Goethe	Succeeded by Doria Pamphilj Gallery
