= Kniep =

Kniep is a surname. Notable people with the surname include:

- Christoph Heinrich Kniep (1755–1825), German painter
- Giselle O. Martin-Kniep (1956–2021), American educator, researcher, program evaluator, and writer
- Hans Kniep (1881–1930), German botanist
