= Christoph Heinrich Kniep =

German painter

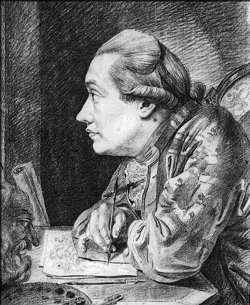
- Selfportrait
- Born: 1755; Hildesheim
- Died: 11 July 1825 (aged 69–70); Naples
- Occupation: Painter

Christoph Heinrich Kniep (1755–1825), was a German painter. He is renowned for accompanying Goethe in his Italian Journey to Naples, Paestum and Sicily, executing several drawings whilst there.

Initially, he worked as a portrait artist, then in 1781 he traveled to Italy, where he painted primarily vistas and landscapes. He met Goethe in Naples, being introduced to him by a mutual friend, the artist Johann Heinrich Wilhelm Tischbein. After separating from Goethe on his return from Sicily, Kniep remained in Naples, where he died in 1825.

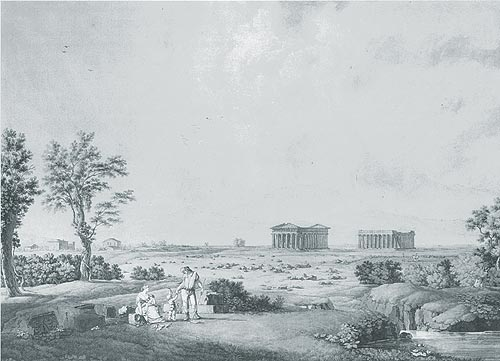
View of the Paestum temples, drawn whilst there with Goethe.

Kniep's drawings of Paestum and Pompeii are of extraordinary detail, and have also been used as archaeological documents.
