= Peter Friedrich Ludwig Tischbein =

German paleontologist (1813–1883)

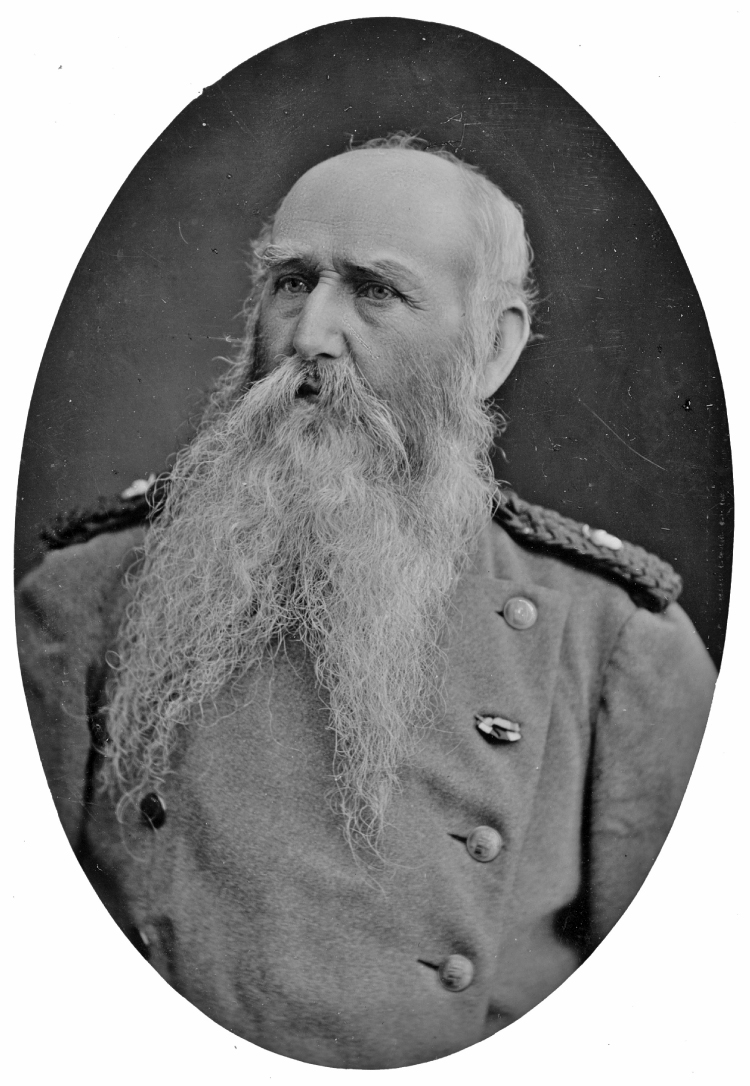
- Peter Tischbein in his Chief Forest Officer - or Oberforstmeister - uniform
- Born: 6 December 1813; Eutin, Bouches-de-l'Elbe, First French Empire
- Died: 5 October 1883 (aged 69); Eutin, Schleswig-Holstein, German Empire
- Known for: A large collections of fossils (especially Hunsrück slate), description of new sawfly species
- Father: Johann Heinrich Wilhelm Tischbein
- Relatives: Elisabeth Susanne Luise Tischbein (sister)
- Scientific career
- Fields: Forestry, paleontology, entomology
- Institutions: Principality of Birkenfeld (1873-1875)

Peter Friedrich Ludwig Tischbein (6 December 1813 in Eutin – 5 October 1883 in Eutin) was a German forester, paleontologist and entomologist. His father was the painter Johann Heinrich Wilhelm Tischbein.

Prior to 1841, he worked as a supervisor in the Lensahn forestry district of Holstein. In 1843 he was named head of the Oberstein forestry department headquartered in Herrstein. In 1852 he attained the title of Oberförster, and in 1873 became a senior official of forested areas in the Principality of Birkenfeld. Two years later, he was named chief forester for the Principality of Lübeck.

As a paleontologist, he collected fossils found in the Hunsrück slate of western Germany, including the brittle star species Euzonosoma tischbeinianum of the extinct family Encrinasteridae.

In the field of entomology, he described four new species of sawfly — Tenthredo hungarica, Cephus pulcher, Macrophya ratzeburgii and Tenthredo albopunctata.
