= Friedrich Bury =

German artist (1763–1823)

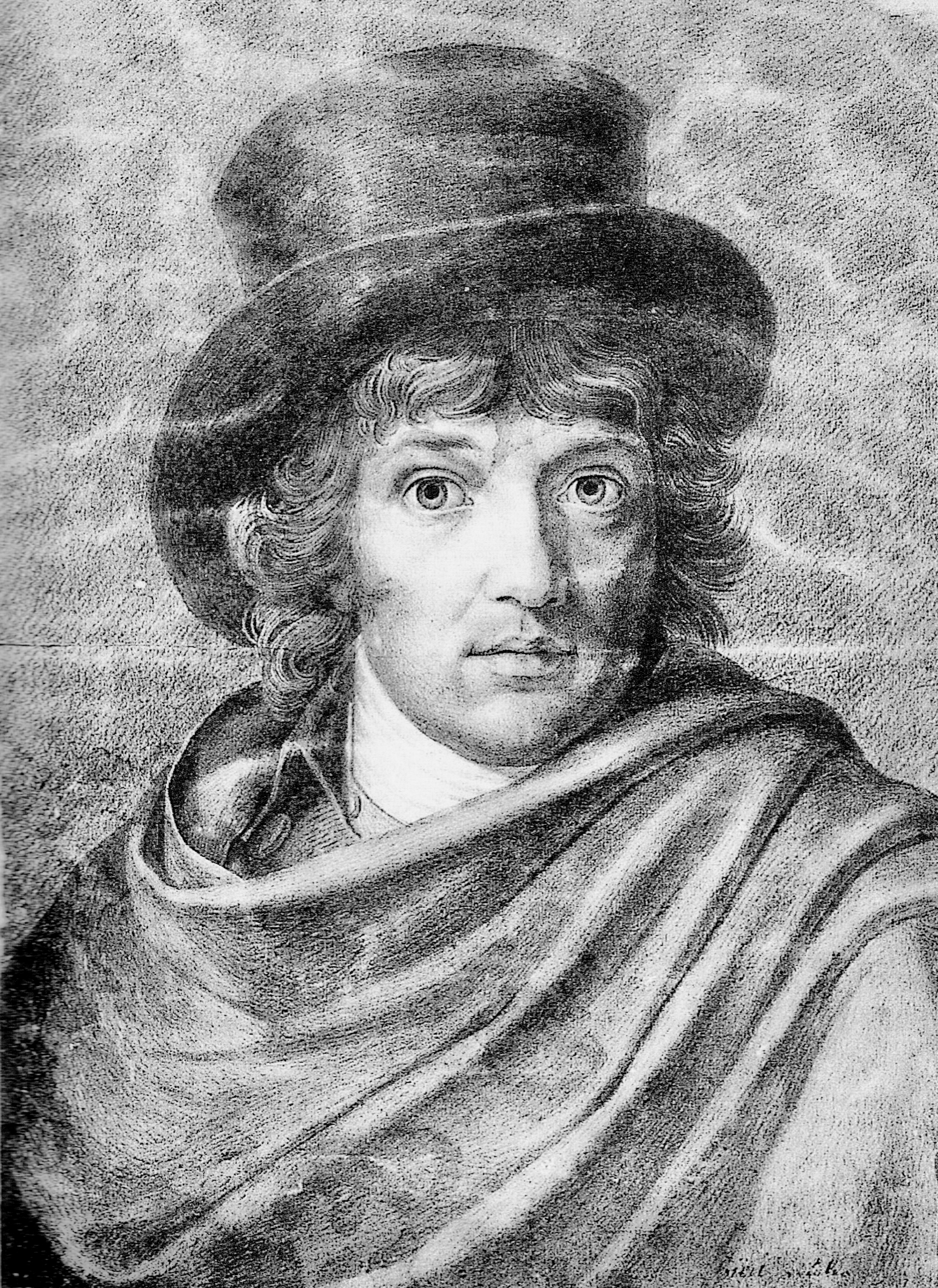
- Portrait of Bury by unknown, c. 1784
- Born: Johann Friedrich Bury; 13 March 1763; Hanau, Hesse, Germany
- Died: 18 May 1823 (aged 60); Aachen, North Rhine-Westphalia, Germany
- Known for: Painting; Drawing

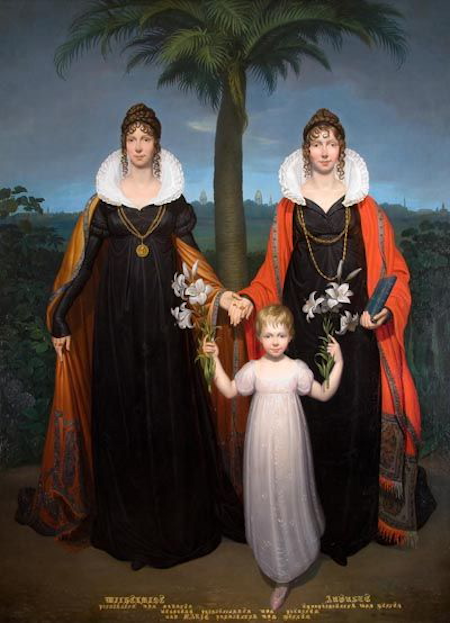
Group portrait with Wilhelmine of Prussia, later on Queen of the Netherlands and her sister Princess Augusta of Prussia with daughter Princess Marie Frederica of Hesse-Kassel by Bury

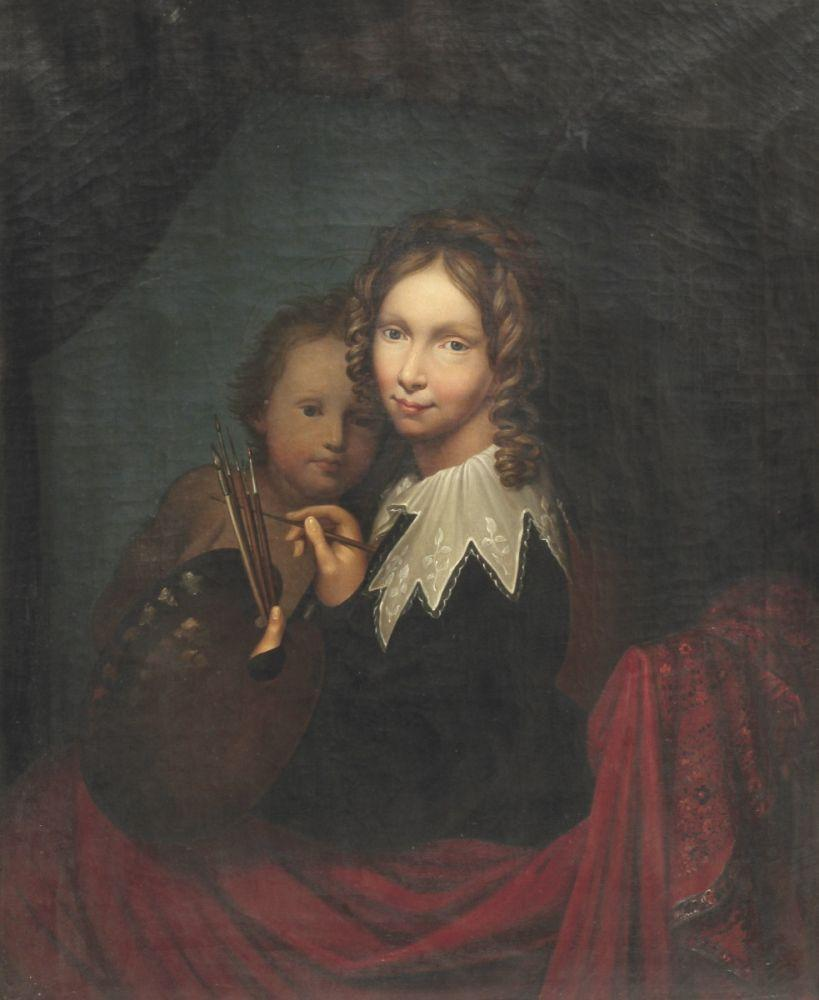
Princess Auguste copying the Sistine Madonna

Friedrich (Fritz) Bury (12 March 1763 – 18 May 1823) was Court painter to the royal courts of Kassel and Brussels, a German painter born in Hanau. He studied first under his father Jean Jacques Bury, who was a goldsmith and professor in the Academy of Design in Hanau, and with Anton Wilhelm Tischbein. In 1780 he visited for two years the Kunstakademie Düsseldorf, where he met Johann Heinrich Lips (who was 5 years older), with whom he returned to Hanau at the age of 19 and two month later they traveled to Rome. From November 1782 to July 1785 he lived with a nephew of Tischbein, Johann Heinrich Wilhelm Tischbein, Johann Georg Schütz and Lips in a rear building of the Palazzo Piombino in Via del Babuino 51. Later they followed their landlord to Via del Corso no. 18, now known as the Casa di Goethe, as Johann Wolfgang von Goethe also lived and worked there for over a year.

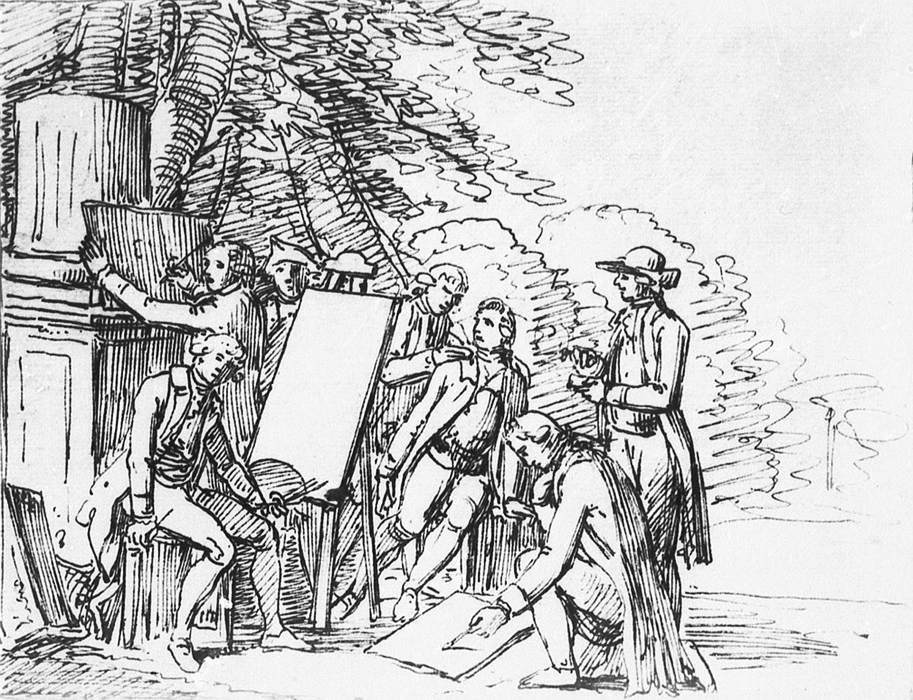
From left: Tischbein, Schütz, Lips, Kayser, Goethe, Bury, Reiffenstein. By Bury, 1787, Goethe-Museum (Düsseldorf)

After Goethe's departure, Bury lived in the former Tischbein studio on the second floor. Bury's role model was, easily recognizable, the Raphael teacher Perugino, but also Fra Bartolommeo and Andrea Mantegna.

It was through Goethe that he met his second mentor in Rome, Duchess Anna Amalia of Saxe-Weimar. On behalf of his two Weimar mentors, Bury made copies of masterpieces, not from the 15th century as they had wished, but from the 14th century. Bury accompanied Anna Amalia to Venice, where Goethe was already waiting. This was followed by a joint journey to Padua, Vicenza, Verona and, at the end of May 1790, Mantua. From there, Goethe and Anna Amalia returned to Weimar, Bury remained. Due to the occupation of Rome by French troops, he was forced to return to Hanau. He initially tried to establish himself in Weimar. When this failed, he went to Kassel and Dresden and finally settled in Berlin, where he was presented to the Prussian royal family. He became a portraitist and teacher of two daughters, Princess Augusta of Prussia and Wilhelmine of Prussia, Queen of the Netherlands.

== Selected portraits ==
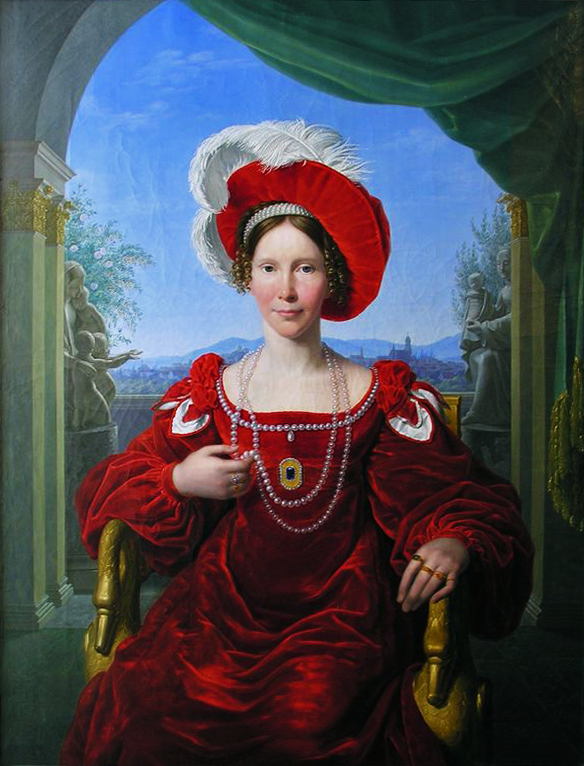
Portrait of Auguste von Hessen-Kassel, ca. 1815, Museum Schloss Elisabethenburg Meiningen

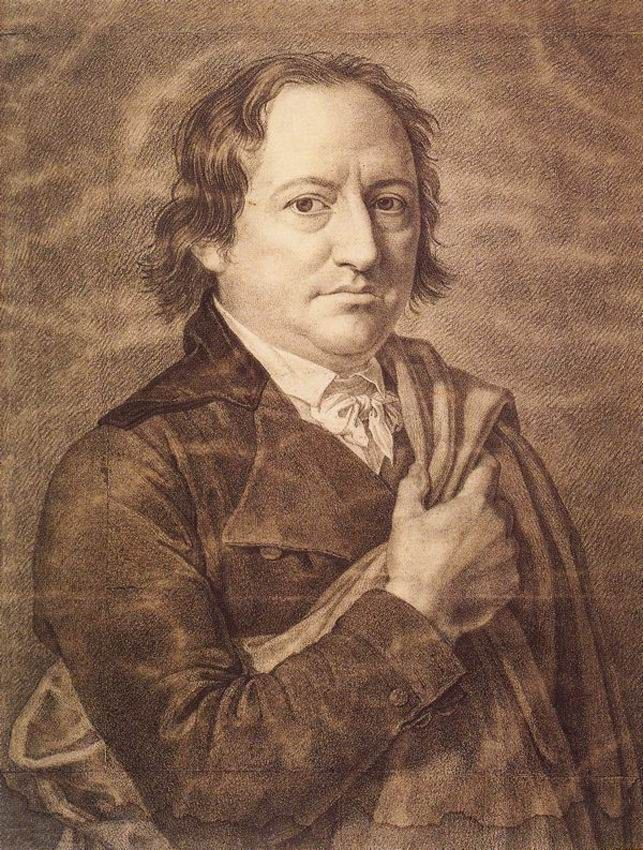
Portrait of Johann Wolfgang von Goethe, chalk drawing, 1800

== Other works ==
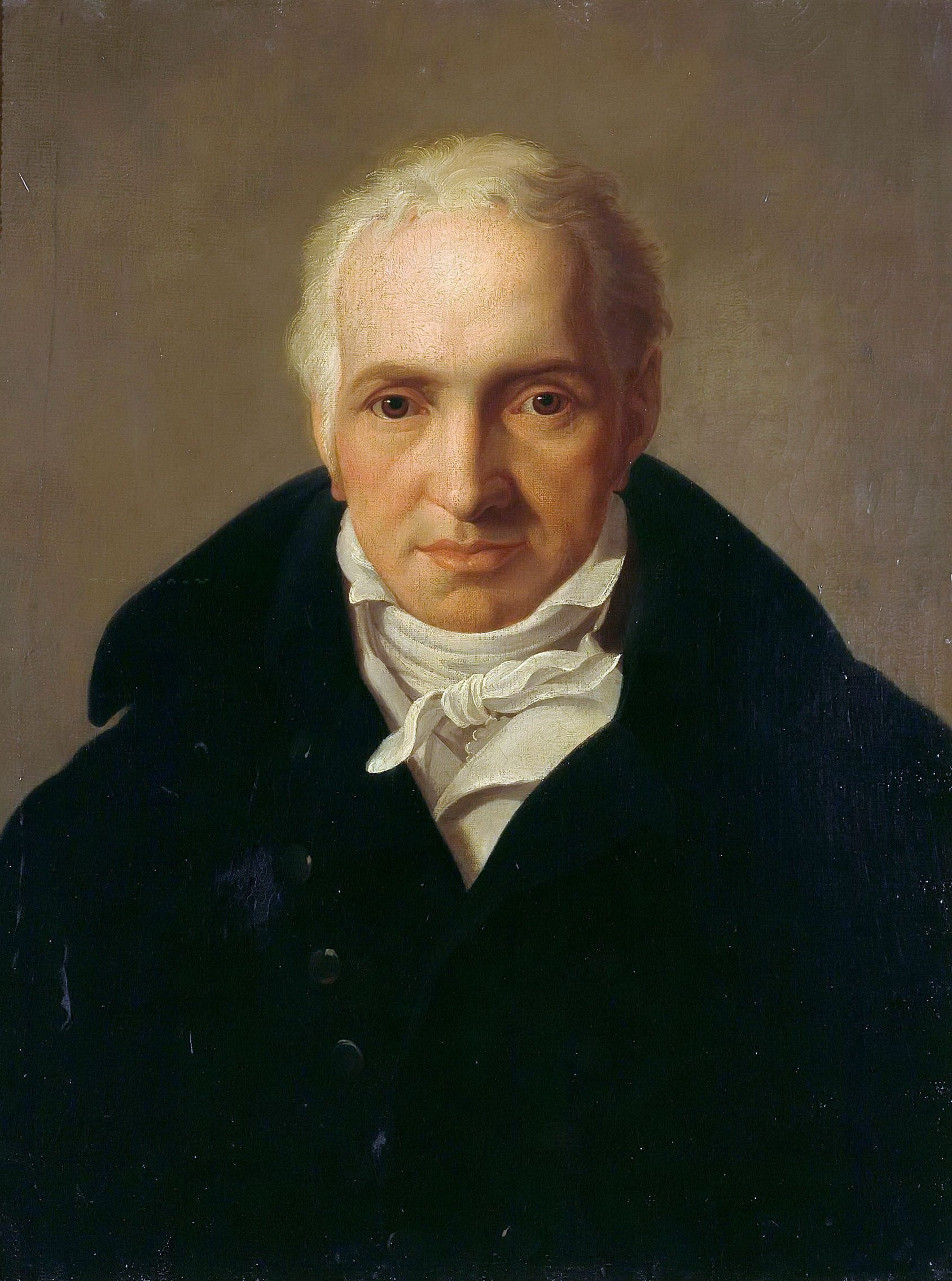
Portrait of Janus Genelli, 1800–1805

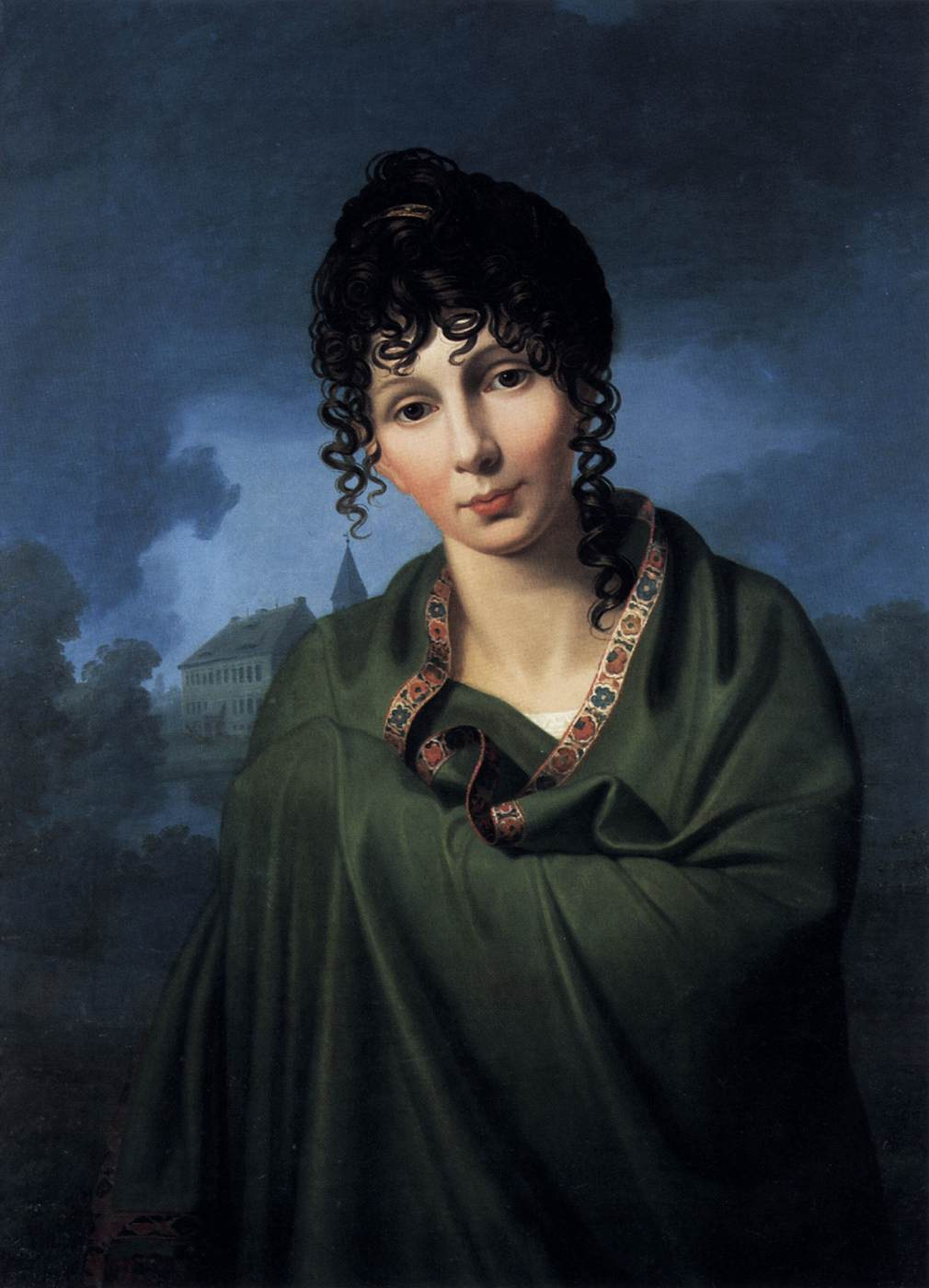
Portrait of Countess Luise von Voss, 1810

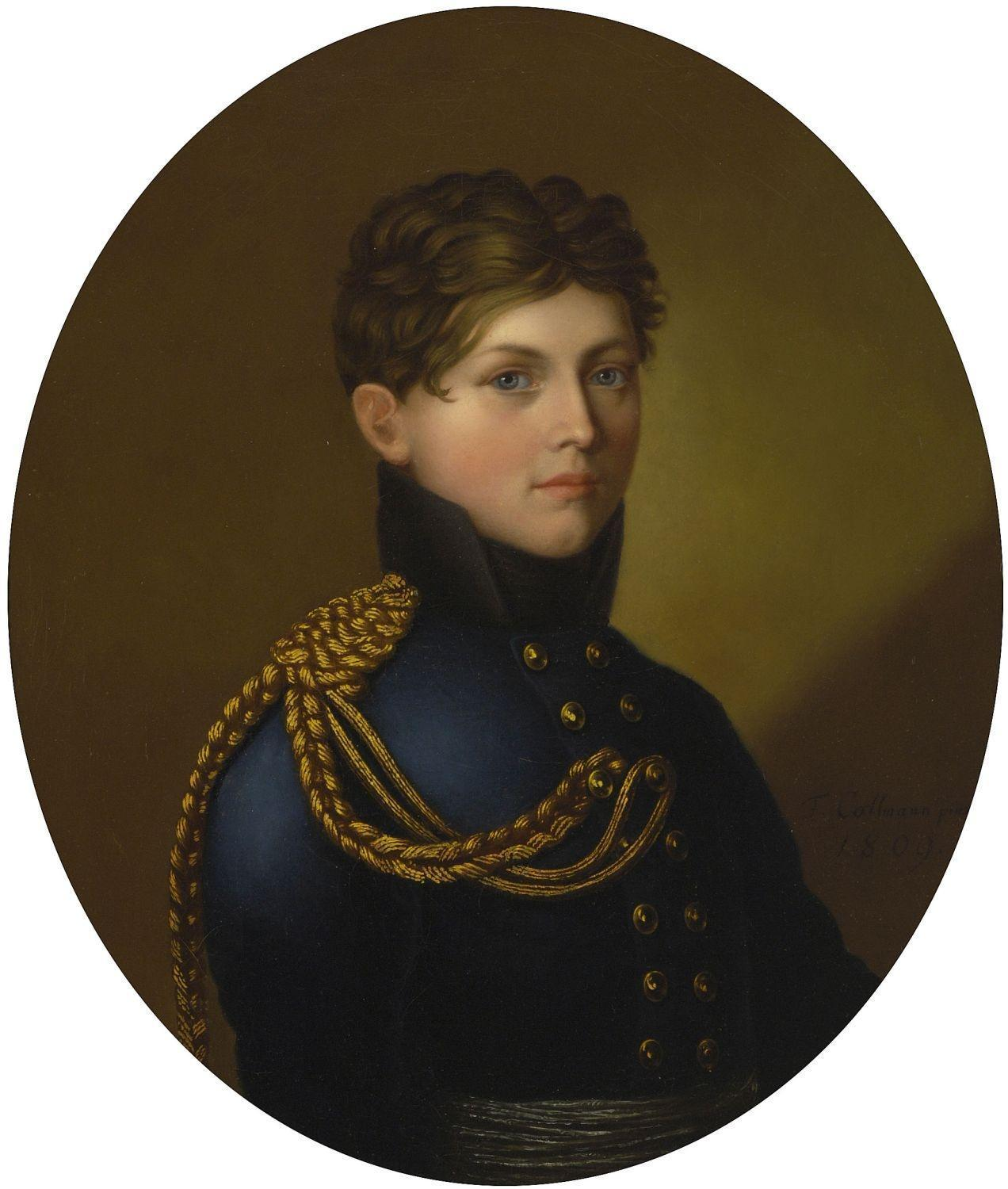
Portrait of Count Karl Hermann von Wylich-Lottum, 1809

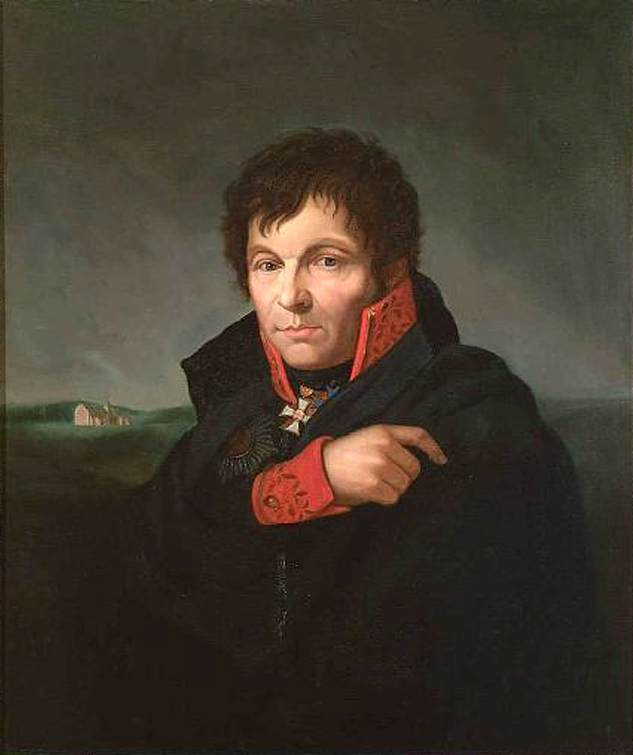
Portrait of General Gerhard Johann David von Scharnhorst, c. 1810

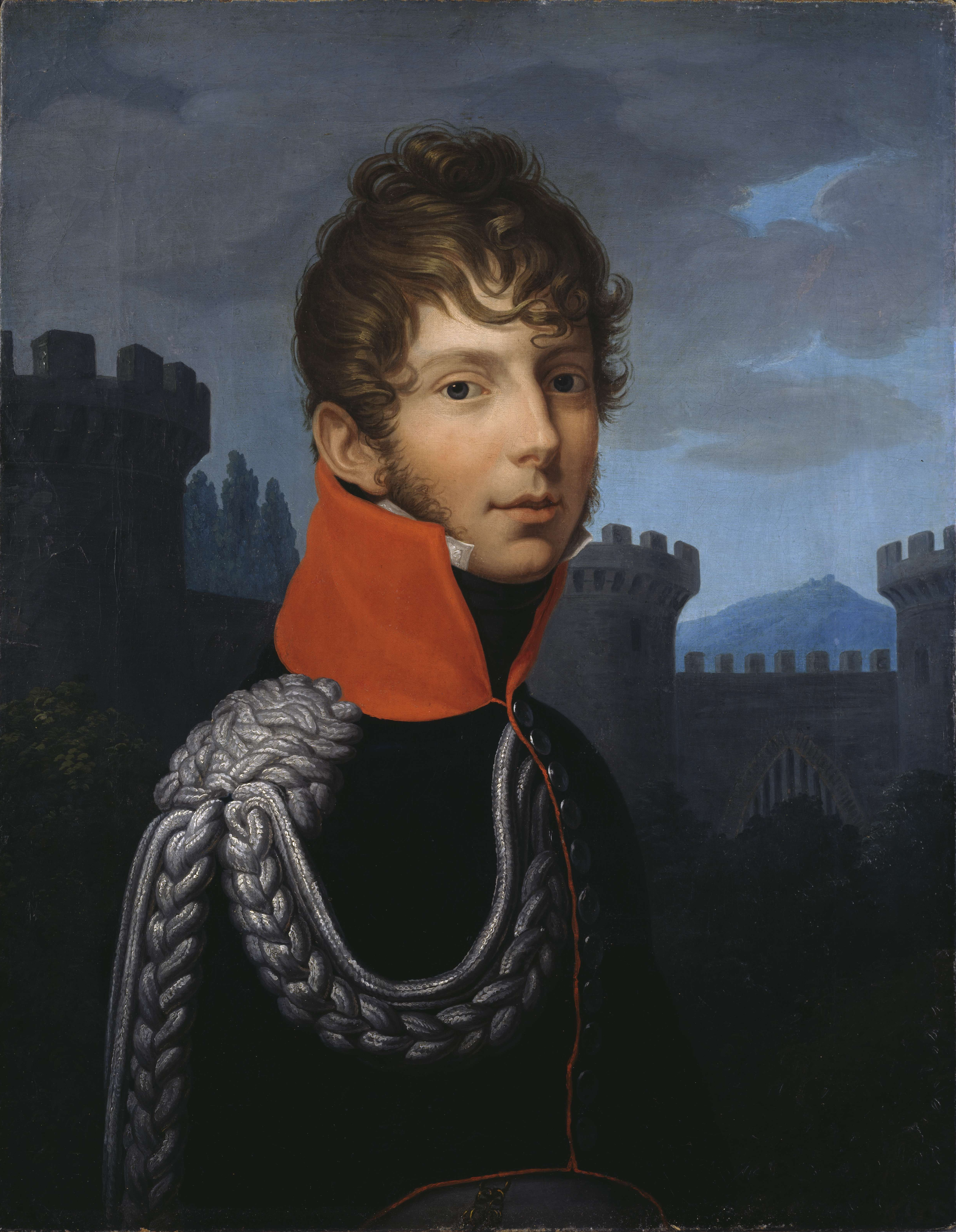
Portrait of Captain Wilhelm Friedrich Ernst von Dalwigk zu Schauenburg, 1805–1810

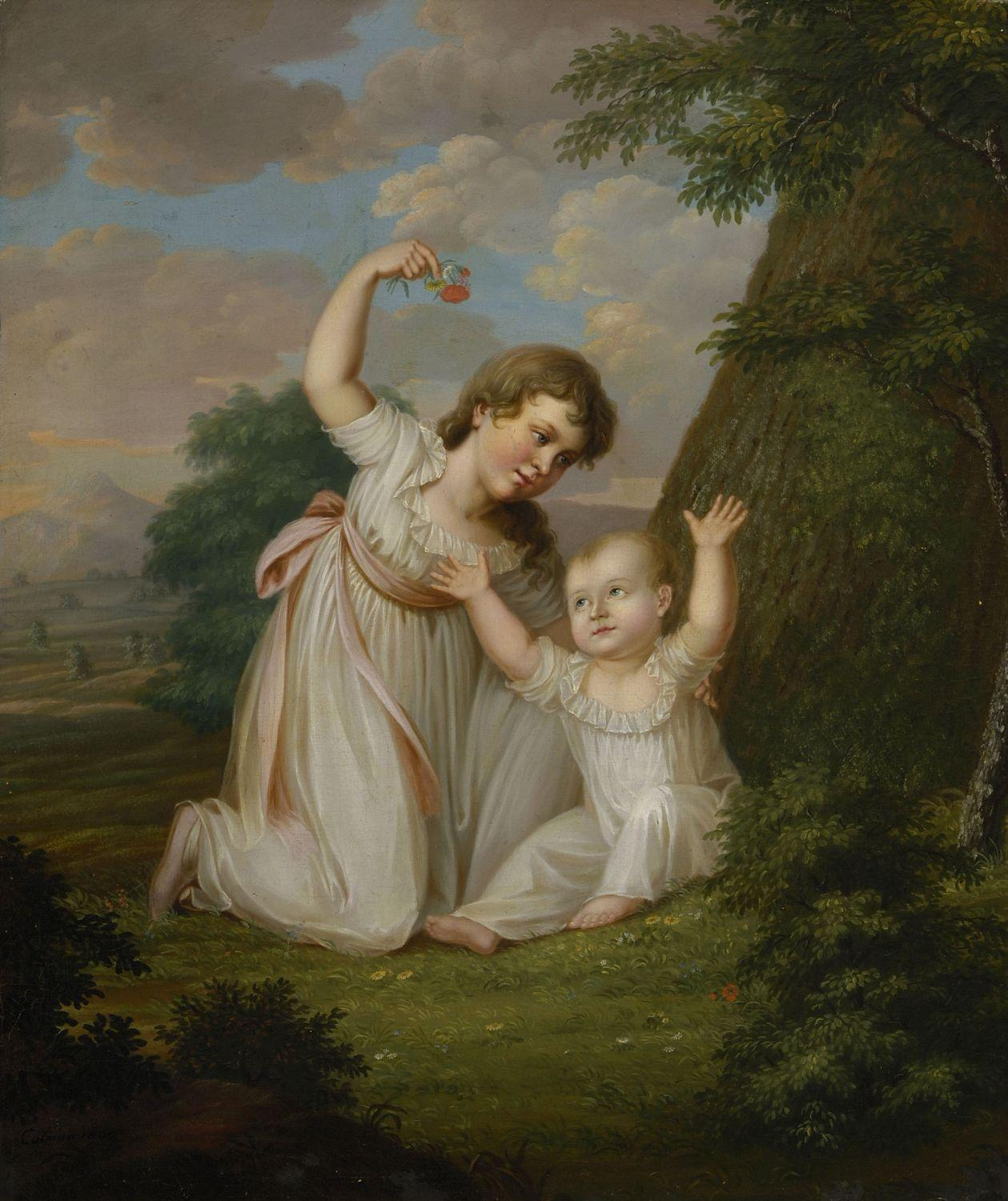
Double portrait of sisters Sophie and Emma Charlotte Constanze von Wylich und Lottum , early 19th century

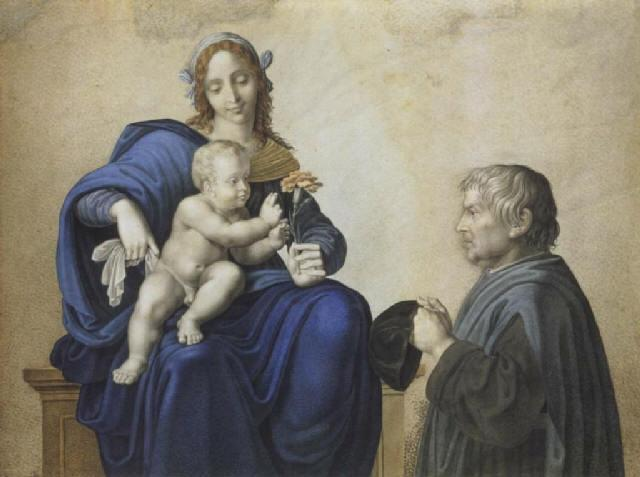
Madonna and Child with Donors, early 19th century

== See also ==
- Klassik Stiftung Weimar
