= Goethe in the Roman Campagna =

1787 painting by Johann Heinrich Wilhelm Tischbein

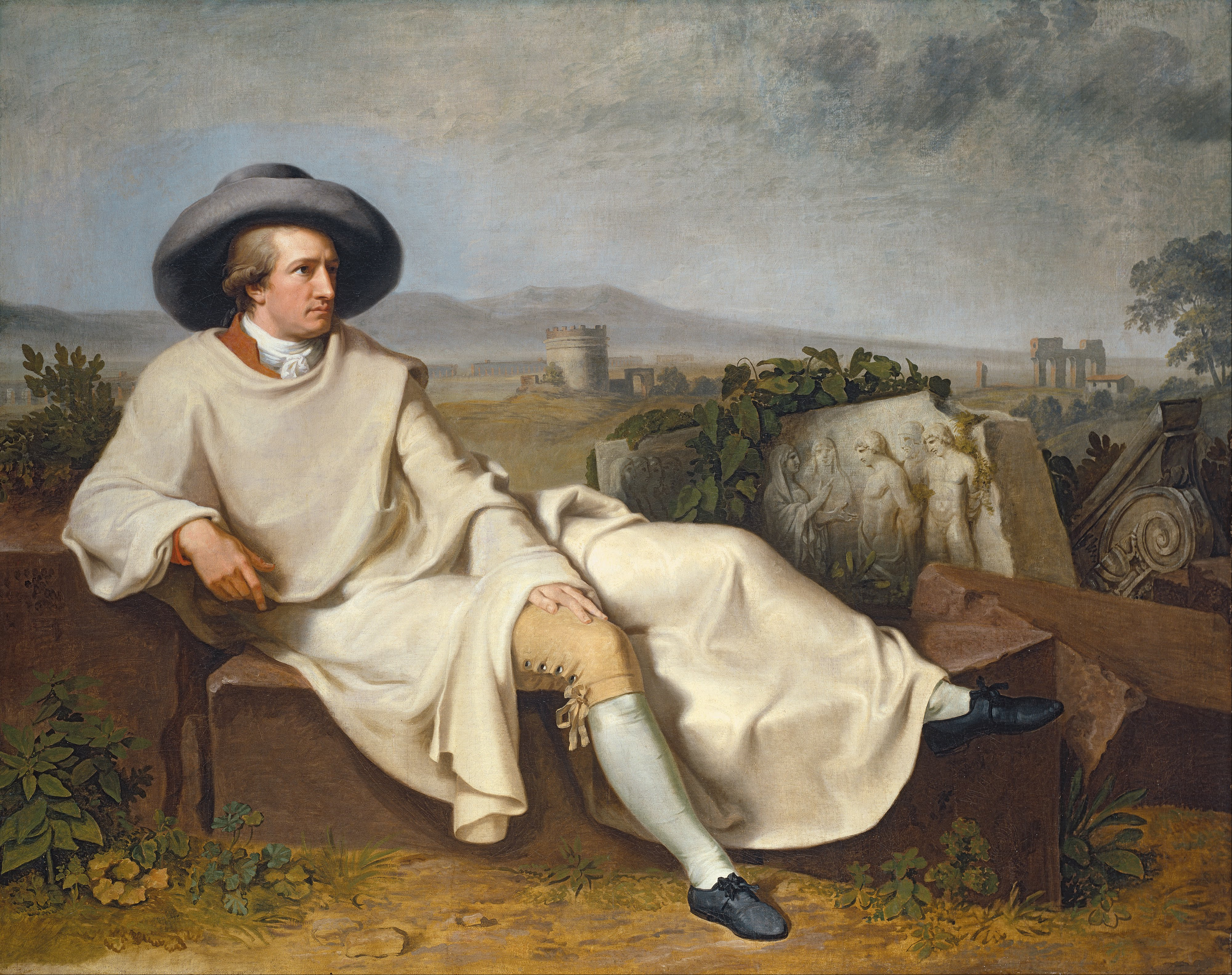
- Artist: Johann Heinrich Wilhelm Tischbein
- Year: 1787
- Medium: oil on canvas
- Dimensions: 164 cm × 206 cm (65 in × 81 in)
- Location: Städel Museum, Frankfurt

Goethe in the Roman Campagna is a 1787 painting by Johann Heinrich Wilhelm Tischbein, a German Neoclassical painter, depicting Johann Wolfgang von Goethe when the writer was travelling in Italy. Goethe's book on his travels to Italy from 1786 to 1788, called Italian Journey, was published in 1816–17; the book is based on his diaries. Since 1887, the painting has been in the possession of the Städel Museum in Goethe's hometown Frankfurt.

== Painting ==
The painting is a full-length portrait began in December 1787 and completed early the following year. Goethe is gazing out through the autumnal landscape southeast of Rome, with his eyes arguably resting at infinity, though the painter, Johann Tischbein, wrote that Goethe is depicted pondering the fate of man's works. Tischbein, whom Goethe met in Italy, portrays the writer as an idealized person. Goethe wears a large wide-brimmed grey hat, fashionable among German artists in Rome at the time, and a creamy white traveler's duster. He is portrayed in a classical manner, informally recumbent in the open air, surrounded by Roman ruins, with the Campagna di Roma in the background. Goethe himself is reclining on blocks of granite, – in the first draft figures with hieroglyphs suggesting they were pieces of a fallen obelisk – emblematic Egypt, a civilization predating those of classical antiquity – Greece is nodded to by the inclusion of a fragment of a frieze depicting Iphigenia in Tauris, the subject of one of Goethe's plays. He recited extracts of his play, which he had begun turning into verse a year earlier, to Tischbein. Tischbein was much taken by the play and depicted the scene of Iphigenia meeting her brother in the painting, on the relief behind Goethe to his left.

The artwork is atypically eclectic, so much so that its multiple derivative allusions could be said to characterize its originality. The ruins in the background, including the tower tomb of Caecilia Metella, the ruins of Tusculum, and, to the right, a Roman aqueduct, indicate the Neoclassicist love of antiquity. In contrast to the asymmetry of dominant Baroque and Rococo styles, Neoclassicism praised simplicity and symmetry and the classic principles of the arts of Rome and Ancient Greece.

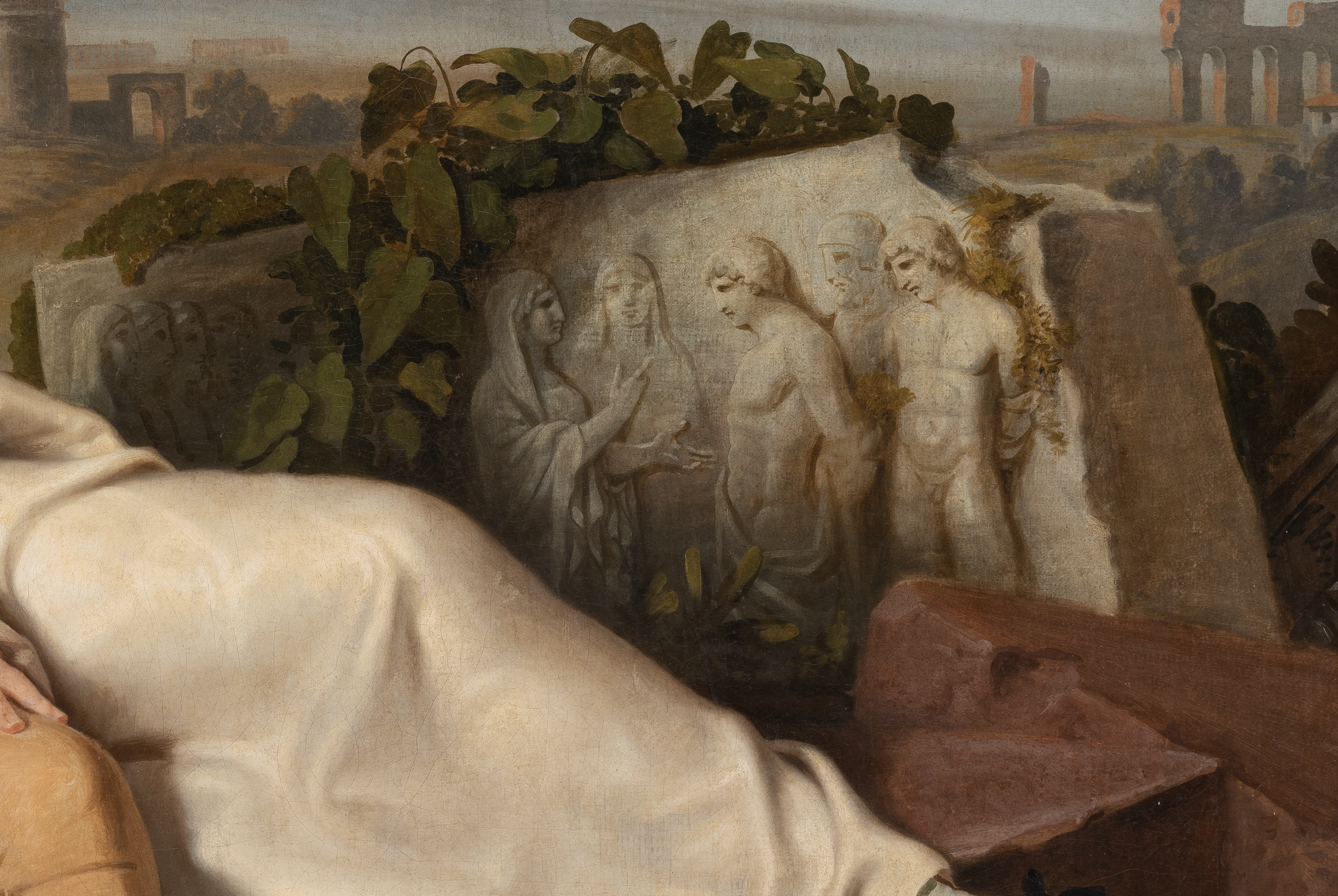
Detail from the painting: relief scene of Iphigenia

The love of classicism bound together the two artists, who both shared this interest, which is mirrored in the painting, though the pastiche of its numerous allusions, and the 'anatomical infelicities' that despoil its naturalism, upset a purely classical tone, producing a kind of sentimental classicism. Et in Arcadia ego (in German: Auch ich in Arkadien!) is the motto of Goethe's Italian Journey. The artists consciously chose a spiritual collaboration to produce the painting and used the Arcadian motif of the Roman Campagna.

The composition is balanced and the colours are restricted. Also, both artist shared an interest for painting. Goethe's occupation with painting resulted seven years earlier Goethe's Theory of Colours (Zur Farbenlehre) is a book about the poet's views on the nature of colours and how these are perceived by human beings. He published it in 1810, and it contained detailed descriptions of phenomena such as coloured shadows, refraction, and chromatic aberration.

In 1887 the painting was donated to the Städel Museum by the private collector Adèle von Rothschild (1843–1922), at a time when the Goethe cult was at its peak. The new German Empire was looking for significant cultural icons that could form a collective past: Goethe and Schiller were elevated to national status. Tischbein's portrait became symbolic of the German high life of knowledge, art and culture. The painting is one of the highlights of the Städel collection, and is considered an icon of German national painting. It played an indisputable role in shaping the image of Goethe as he is perceived today, as embodying Germany's classical humanistic ideal.

== Goethe and Tischbein ==
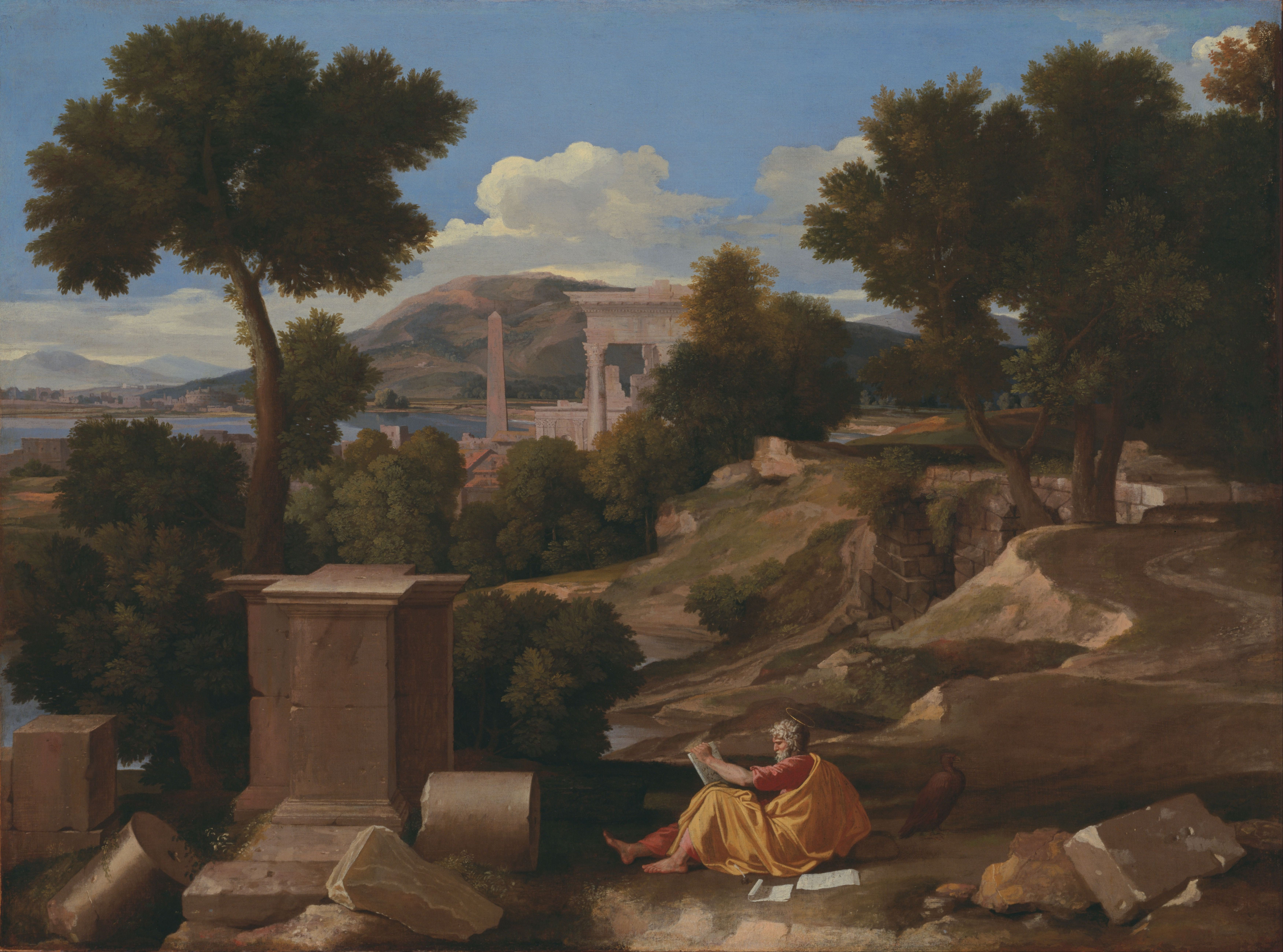
Classical painter Nicolas Poussin's Landscape with Saint John on Patmos (1640); the ruins are typical subject matter for painters in the classical style.

Goethe decided to travel to Rome to study the ancient world. His choice of Rome fitted entirely in the spirit of the times: many German artists were studying there at the time. The aesthetic appreciation of the antiquity was typical for classicism. The peace and serenity of the classical arts attracted them, as a counterbalance to such recent movements as the Baroque and Rococo. This was an intellectual and spiritual movement of the time, an intellectual fashion and a dominant school of thought that typified and influenced the culture of this particular period in time and that affected even Goethe and Tischbein. Goethe was also looking for a new balance and a possible inner transformation, after he had a long-standing platonic love affair with Charlotte von Stein, which had resulted in the 1774 novel The Sorrows of Young Werther, that became so popular that Goethe had to travel under a pseudonym to avoid recognition. He called himself "Pittore Filippo Miller". Goethe decided to make the Grand Tour since he was fascinated by classical Italy, and started his travel in September 1786. During the journey, in Rome, he met several German artists, and stayed with Tischbein with whom he had become friendly through correspondence, fixing a scholarship for the painter, through his connections – a second Rome-stipend. The Tischbeins were a family of renowned painters well known in Germany long before Goethe himself became famous, with Johann Heinrich Wilhelm a member of the fourth generation.

The two artists' values met in the appreciation of classicism and the world of the antiquity, and they became friends. Tischbein and Goethe travelled together, made short trips in Italy and experienced adventures together. However, the intense friendship between them would come to an end after three months. The characters of the two artists differed too greatly to allow an enduring friendship. In Naples they later separated due to their incompatible interests.
