= Johann Heinrich Wilhelm Tischbein =

German painter (1751–1829)

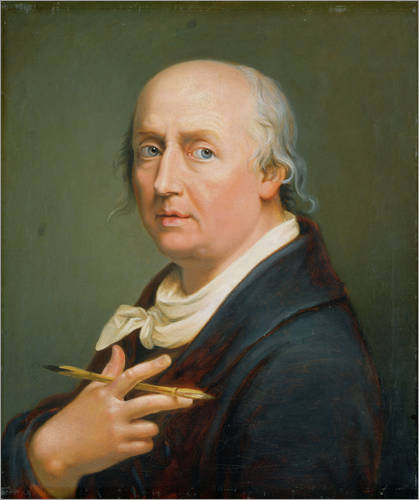
Heinrich Tischbein, self portrait

Johann Heinrich Wilhelm Tischbein, also known as the "Goethe Tischbein" (15 February 1751 – 26 June 1829), was a German painter from the Tischbein family of artists.

== Biography ==
Johann Heinrich Wilhelm Tischbein was born on 15 February 1751 in Haina. His father was Johann Conrad, a carpenter. Tischbein began his artistic studies with his uncle, Johann Heinrich Tischbein the Elder (The "Kassel Tischbein"), in 1765, when Johann Heinrich Wilhelm was only 14 years old. Soon after, he began his travels, first working at the studio of his uncle Johann Jacob Tischbein in Hamburg before moving to Bremen in 1771, and then travelling through Holland in 1772 and 1773.

Tischbein returned to Kassel in 1773. Between 1773 and 1775 he completed many portrait commissions with his brother Johann Heinrich Tischbein the Younger. In 1777, he established himself as a portrait painter in Berlin, and completed commissions with the help of his younger brother Heinrich Jacob. Johann Heinrich Wilhelm was able to visit Rome in 1779 and continue his studies, thanks to a stipend from the Kunsthochschule Kassel. During this time, his style progressed from Rococo to Classicism. After leaving Italy in 1781, Tischbein moved on to Zurich. In Zurich he worked for Johann Kaspar Lavater on his Physiognomische Fragmente project.

In 1783, Tischbein received another stipendium, this time from Duke Ernest II (upon the recommendation of Johann Wolfgang von Goethe), allowing him to return to Rome from Zurich. He remained in Italy until 1799 and became friends with Goethe upon the latter's "Italian Journey" in 1786-1788. Tischbein shared a house on Rome's Via del Corso with the painters Friedrich Bury, Johann Heinrich Meyer, Johann Heinrich Lips and Johann Georg Schütz. Goethe lodged for over a year in the shared flat, which is now the Casa di Goethe museum, and they travelled together to Naples in 1787. In the same year, Tischbein painted his famous Goethe in the Roman Campagna. Tischbein taught Goethe to draw during this time. In July 1787 Tischbein relocated to Naples, where he was named director of the Accademia di Belle Arti di Napoli in 1789. He held this position until 1799, when he was forced to leave following the French invasion and the establishment of the Parthenopean Republic.

Tischbein was also an accomplished printmaker. While he was in Naples in the 1790s, he designed and printed etchings and engravings of motifs taken from antique vases as well as illustrations to Homer’s Iliad and Odyssey. The vase engravings were probably intended for a supplementary fifth volume of Sir William Hamilton’s Collection of Engravings from Ancient Vases, the Homer illustrations appeared in Homer nach Antiken gezeichnet.

After leaving Naples, Tischbein travelled across Germany, visiting Kassel, Hanover and Göttingen. He eventually settled in Hamburg until 1808. After 1808, he worked for Grand Duke Peter I of Oldenburg at his summer residence of Eutin Castle. He spent several years after 1810 writing his autobiography, Aus meinem Leben. Tischbein died in Eutin on 26 June 1829.

His son, Peter Friedrich Ludwig Tischbein, was a noted forester and naturalist.

== Gallery ==
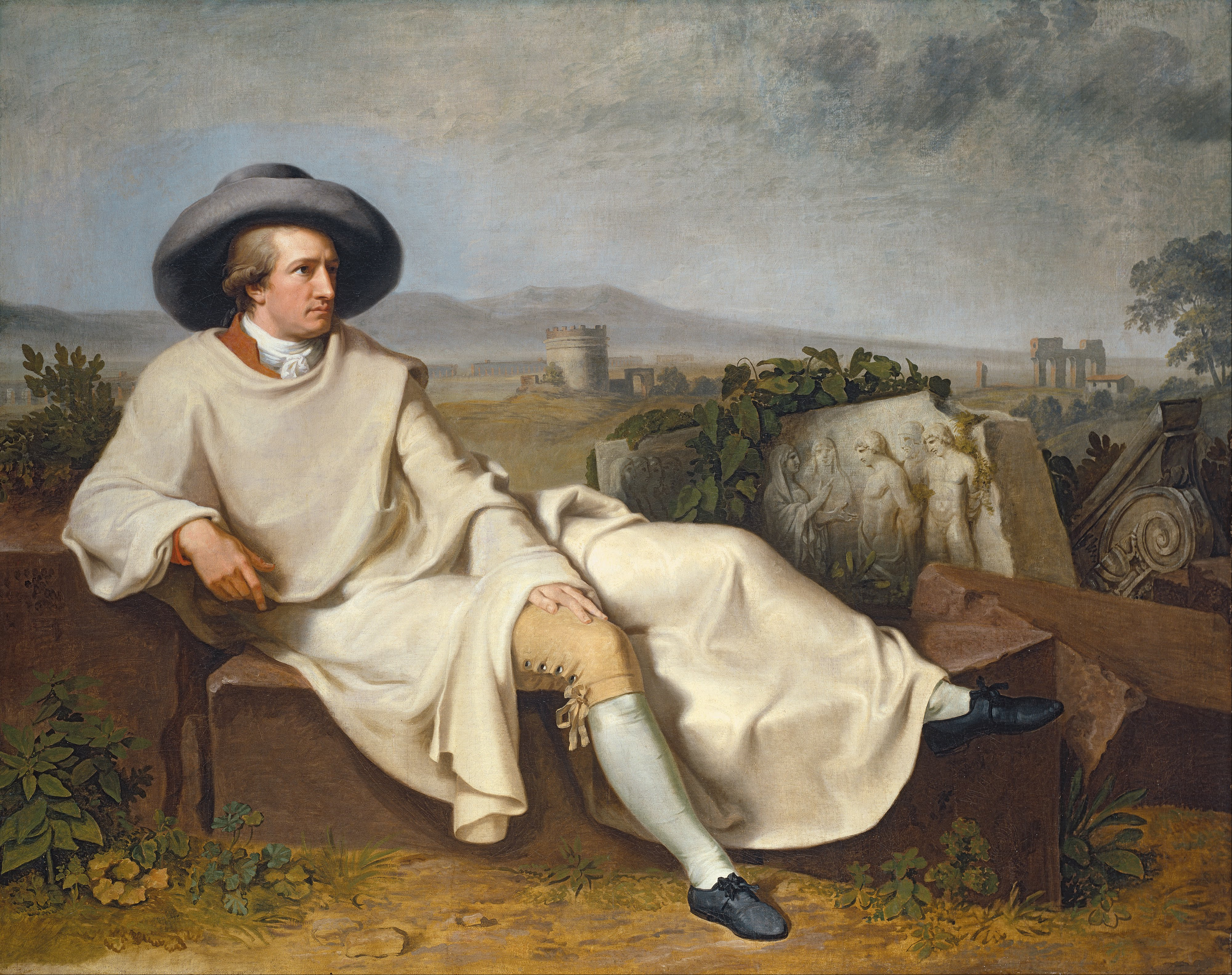
Tischbein's most famous painting: Goethe in the Roman Campagna, 1787

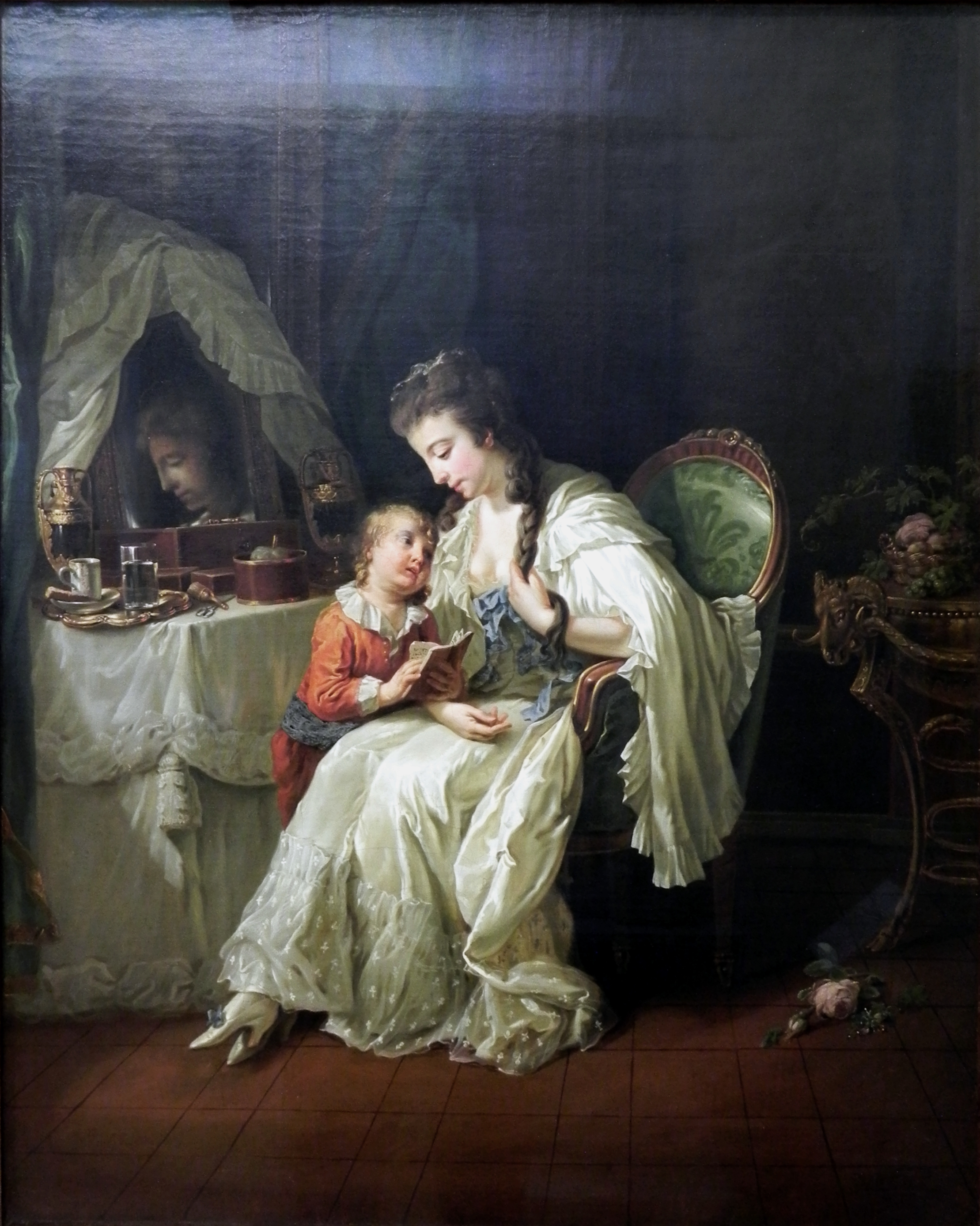
Family Scene (1778)

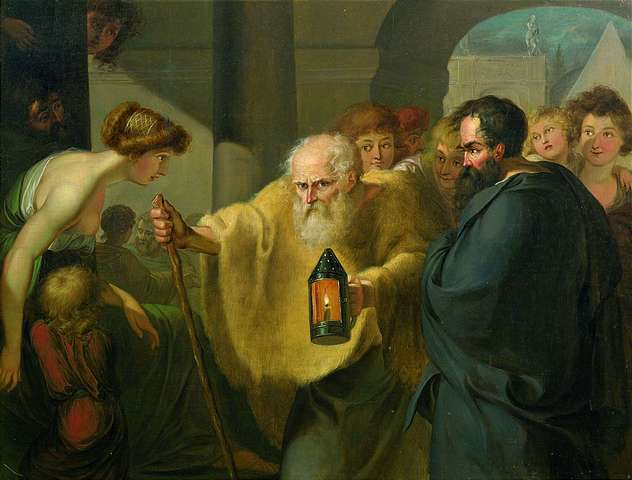
Diogenes Searching for a Man (1780s)

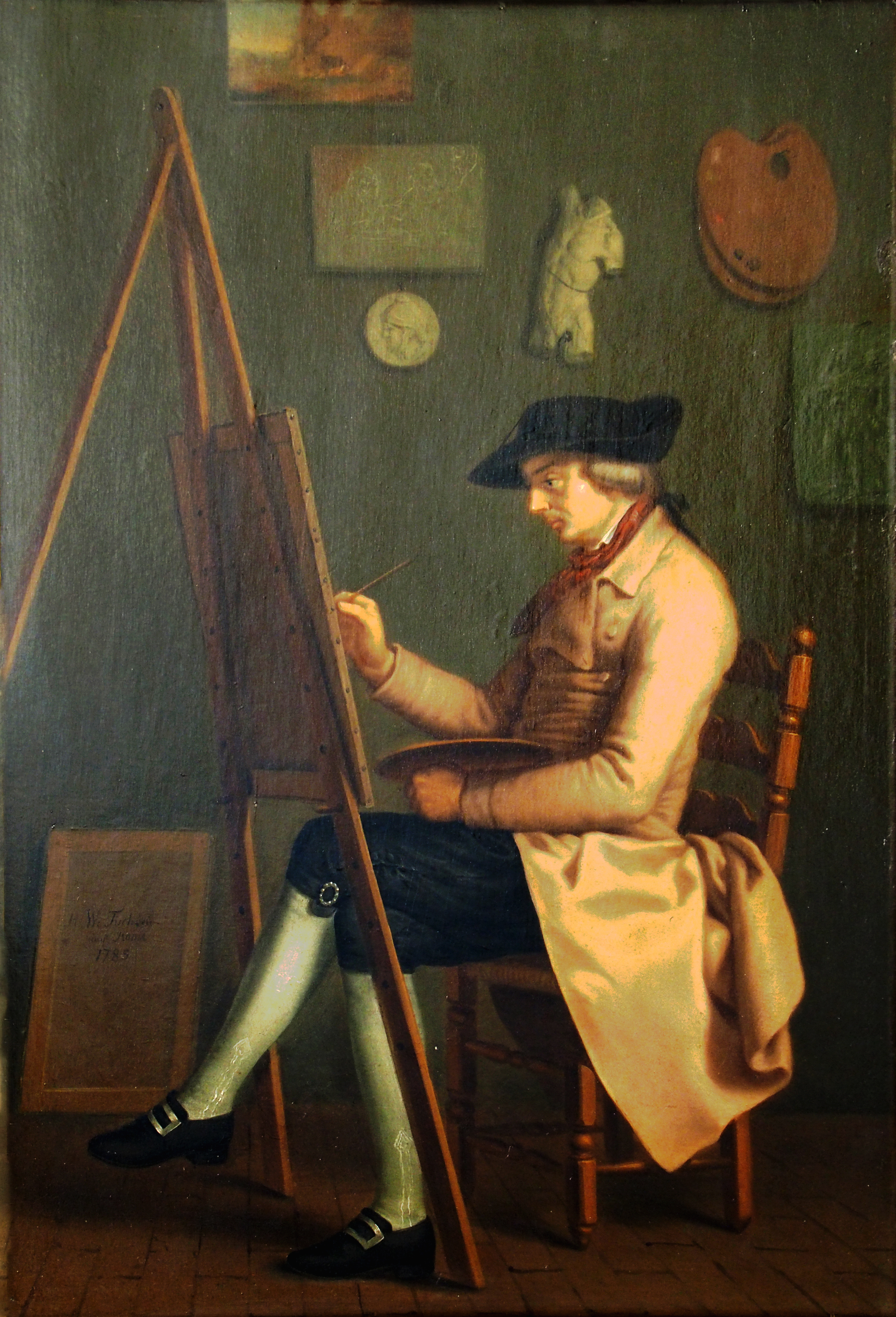
Self portrait (1785)

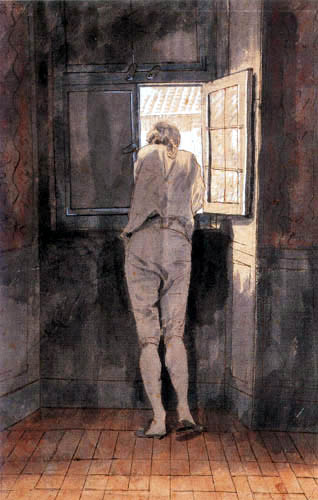
Goethe at the Window of Tischbein's flat in Rome (1787)

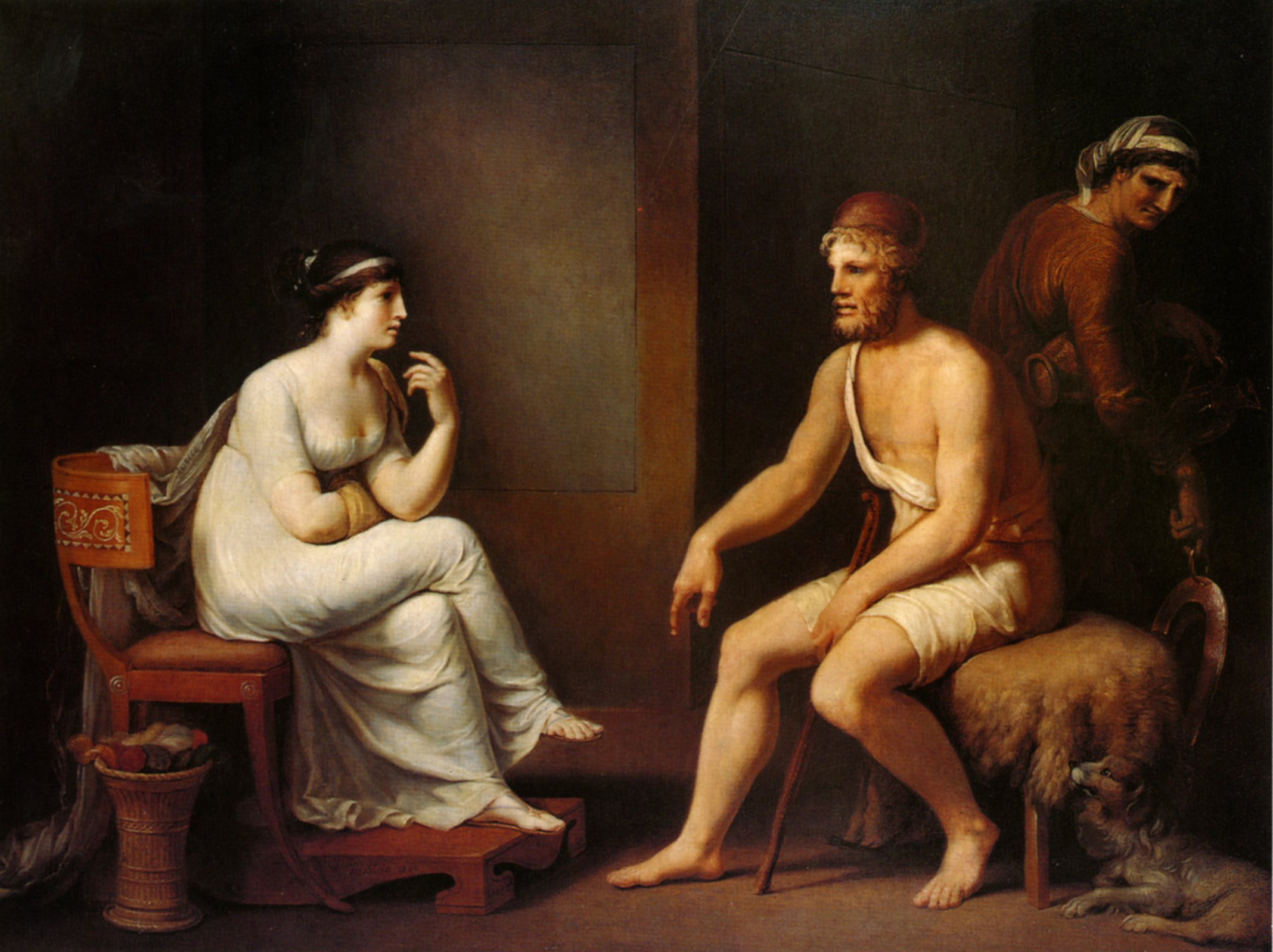
Ulysses and Penelope (1802)

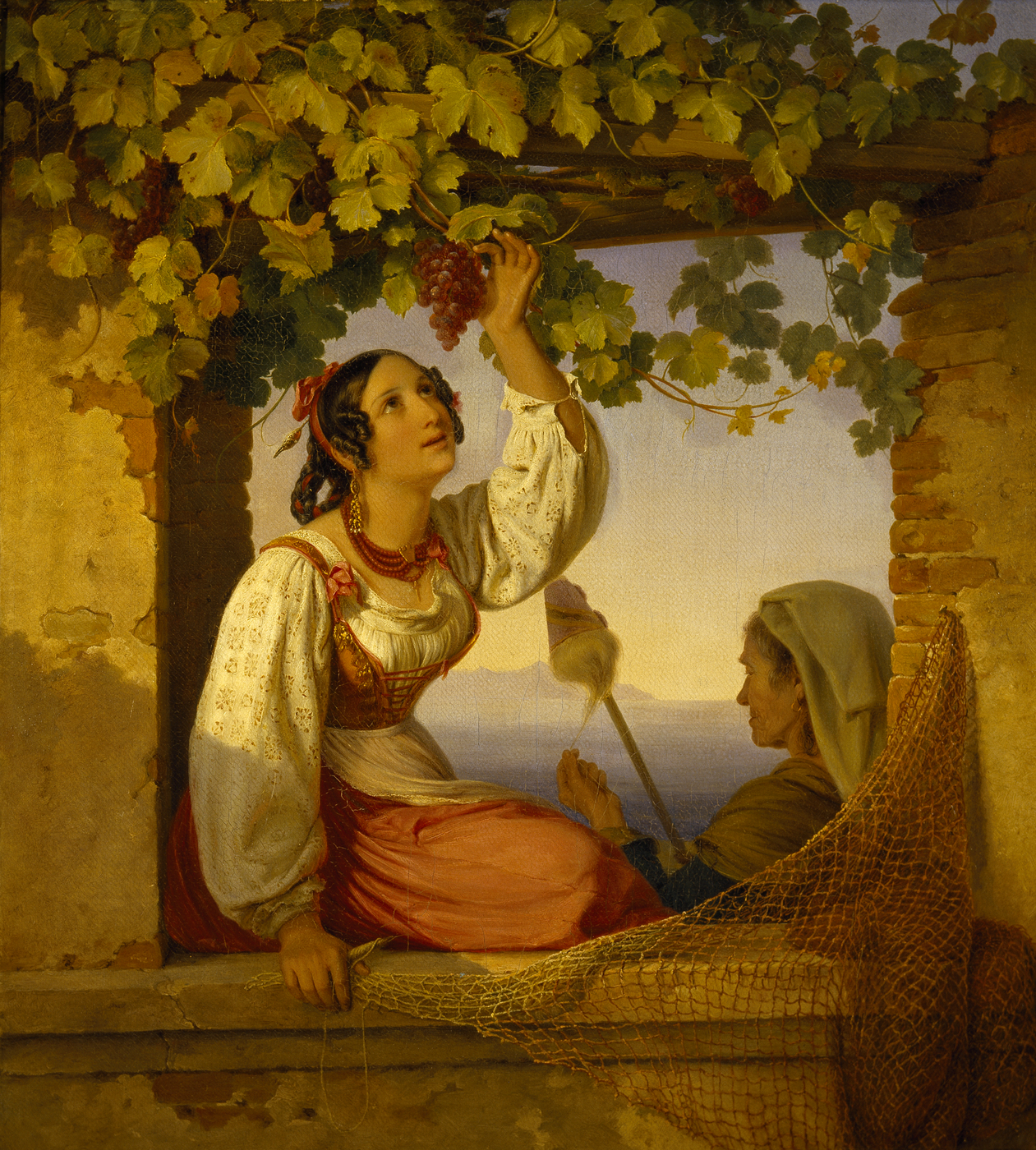
A Naples fisherman's daughter (c. 1817)

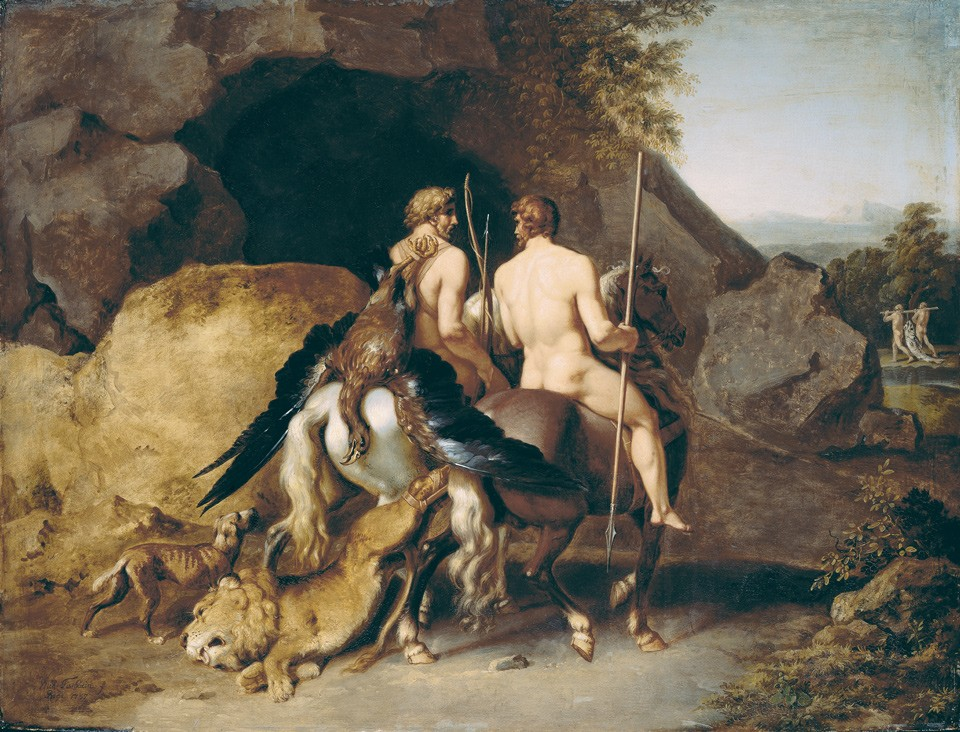
The Strength of Man (1821)

== Sources ==
- Fulton, Lesley (2023). “Johann Heinrich Wilhelm Tischbein’s Album of Prints in the British Museum”. Print Quarterly, vol. 40, June 2023, pp. 150–169. https://printquarterly.co.uk/contents-of-volume-40-2023/
- Heinz, Marianne (2005). "Die Malerfamilie Tischbein". 3x Tischbein und die europäische Malerei um 1800 (in German). Italy: Hirmer Verlag. pp. 20–30. ISBN 3-7774-2785-3.
- "J.H.W. Tischbeins biographische Daten". J.H.W. Tischbein (in German). Neumünster: Karl Wachholtz Verlag. 1986. pp. 251–255. ISBN 3-529-02545-3.
