= Johann Friedrich Reiffenstein =

German artist (1719–1793)

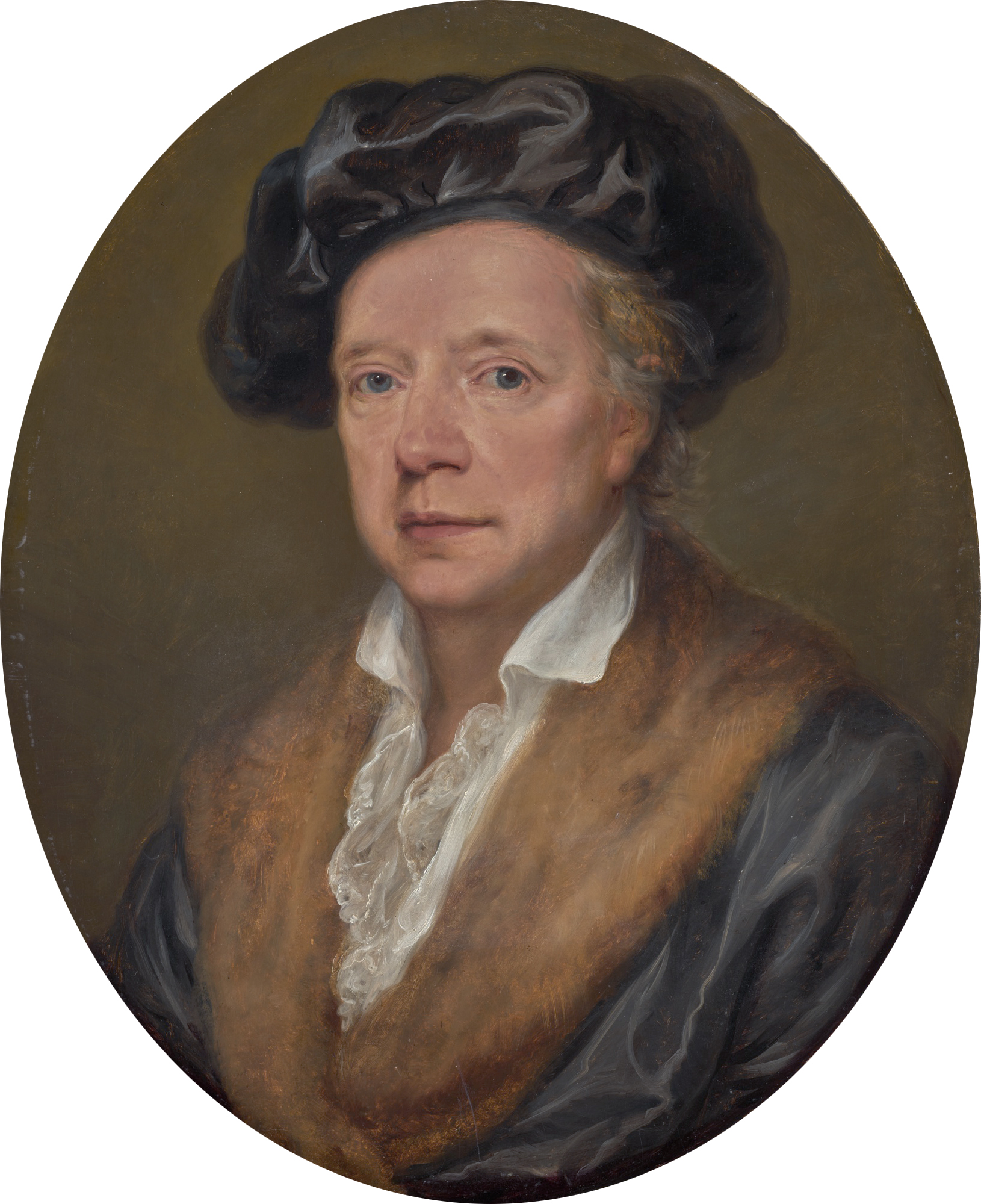
Johann Friedrich Reiffenstein (1719–1793) (Angelica Kauffmann)

Johann Friedrich Reiffenstein(born 22 November 1719, Ragnit, – died 6 October 1793, Rome) was a German cicerone for grand tourists, painter, antiquarian and agent for art collectors in Rome.
