= Johann Heinrich Lips =

Swiss copper engraver

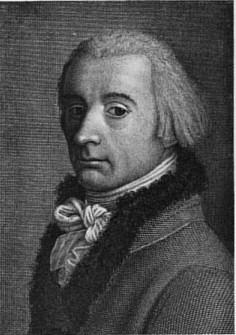
Self-portrait (date unknown)

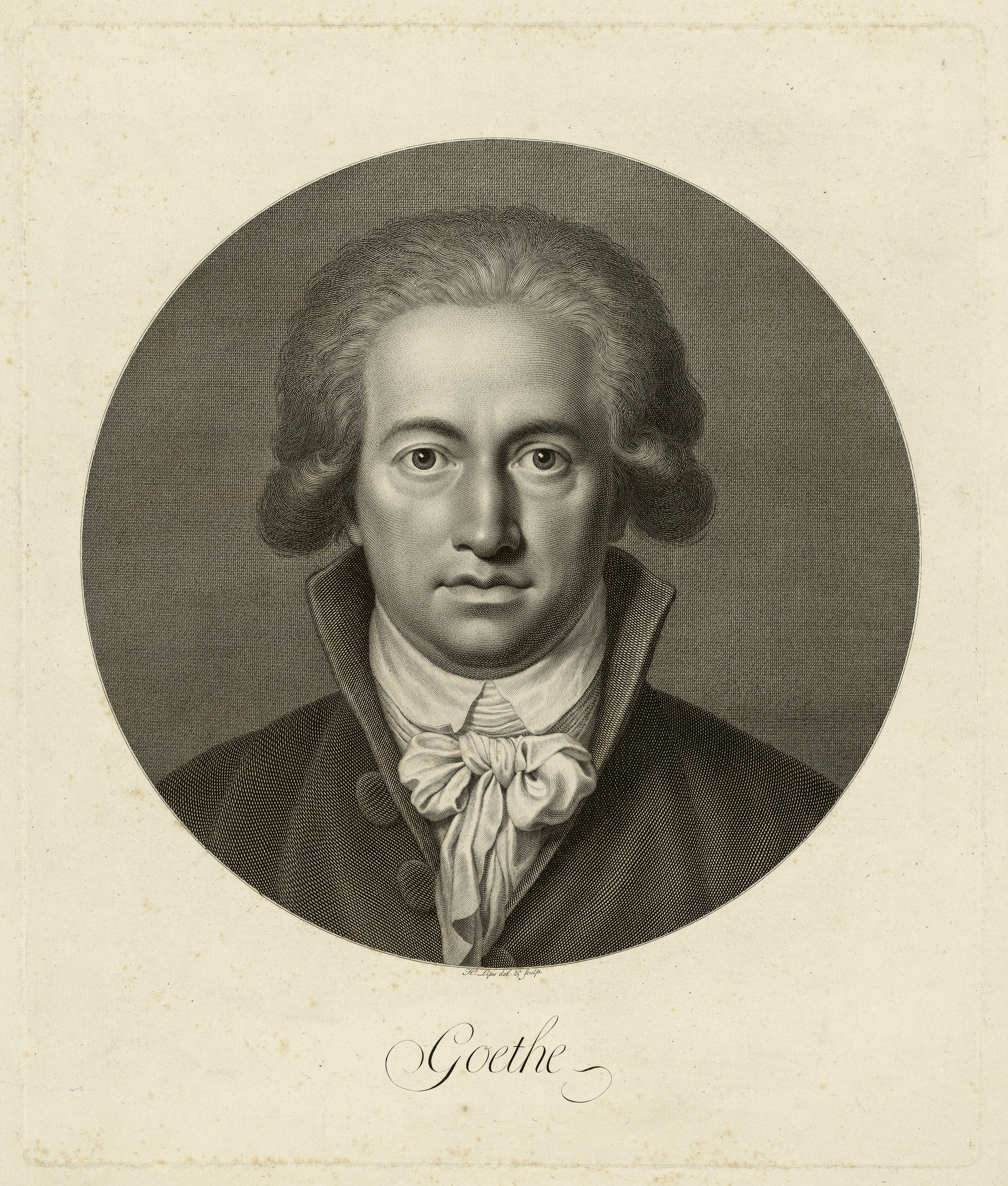
Portrait of Johann Wolfgang von Goethe (1791); used on several German postage stamps.

Johann Heinrich Lips (29 April 1758, in Kloten – 5 May 1817, in Zürich) was a Swiss copper engraver; mostly of portraits.

== Biography ==
His father was the village surgeon and barber. His Latin teacher, the local pastor, introduced him to Johann Caspar Lavater who was impressed by Lips' talent for drawing, persuaded his parents to let him study art, and arranged an apprenticeship for him with the painter, Johann Caspar Füssli. Later, he was also able to obtain a position with the etcher, Johann Rudolf Schellenberg, in Winterthur.

From 1774 to 1776, he worked with Schellenberg to produce the illustrations for Lavater's famous work Physiognomische Fragmente zur Beförderung der Menschenkenntniß und Menschenliebe, a major treatise on physiognomy. Following that, he briefly worked with Johann Caspar's son, Johann Heinrich Füssli, better known as Henry Fuseli.

From 1780 to 1782, with financial assistance, he made a study tour of Germany which included time at the Drawing Academy in Mannheim and a visit to Düsseldorf, where he discovered the works of Anthony van Dyck. From 1782 to 1789, he spent much of his time in Rome, where he became part of the German artistic community; befriending Johann Heinrich Wilhelm Tischbein, who was touring Italy with Goethe. Although grateful to Lavater for his continuing support, he felt trapped in Rome and his natural tendency to hypochondria intensified.

In 1789, thanks to a recommendation from Goethe, he was able to become a Professor at the Weimar Princely Free Drawing School. While there, he illustrated works by Goethe and Friedrich Schiller and created portraits of numerous German creative artists and intellectuals. He quit his position five years later, following a rift with Goethe, and returned to Zürich. In 1796, he was married and, the following year, became a citizen there. During this time, he illustrated the complete works of Christoph Martin Wieland. After 1801, he was a regular participant in the exhibitions of the Zürcher Künstlergesellschaft (art society). He left a legacy of almost 1,500 engravings.
