= Uncle Bräsig (TV series) =

- Genre: Historical drama
- Based on: From My Farming Days by Fritz Reuter
- Directed by: Stanislav Barabas; Volker Vogeler
- Starring: Fritz Hollenbeck
- Composer: Jens-Peter Ostendorf
- Country of origin: West Germany
- Original language: German
- No. of series: 3
- No. of episodes: 42

Production
- Running time: 25 minutes
- Production companies: Norddeutsches Werbefernsehen; Studio Hamburg

Original release
- Network: ARD
- Release: 24 February 1978 – 3 December 1980

Uncle Bräsig (German: Onkel Bräsig) is a West German period drama television series which first aired on ARD between 1978 and 1980. It is based on the novel From My Farming Days by Fritz Reuter, which had previously been made into the 1936 film Uncle Bräsig. It is set in Mecklenburg in the 1840s.

== Partial cast ==
- Fritz Hollenbeck as Onkel Bräsig
- Robert Zimmerling as Karl Havermann
- Uwe Dallmeier as Jochen Nüßler
- Helga Feddersen as Frau Pomuchelskopp
- Claus Jahncke as Fritz Triddelfitz
- Alexander Radszun as Franz von Rambow
- Joachim Wolff as Pomuchelskopp

== Bibliography ==
- Jovan Evermann. Der Serien-Guide: M-S. Schwarzkopf & Schwarzkopf, 1999.
