= Paul Tischbein =

German illustrator and painter

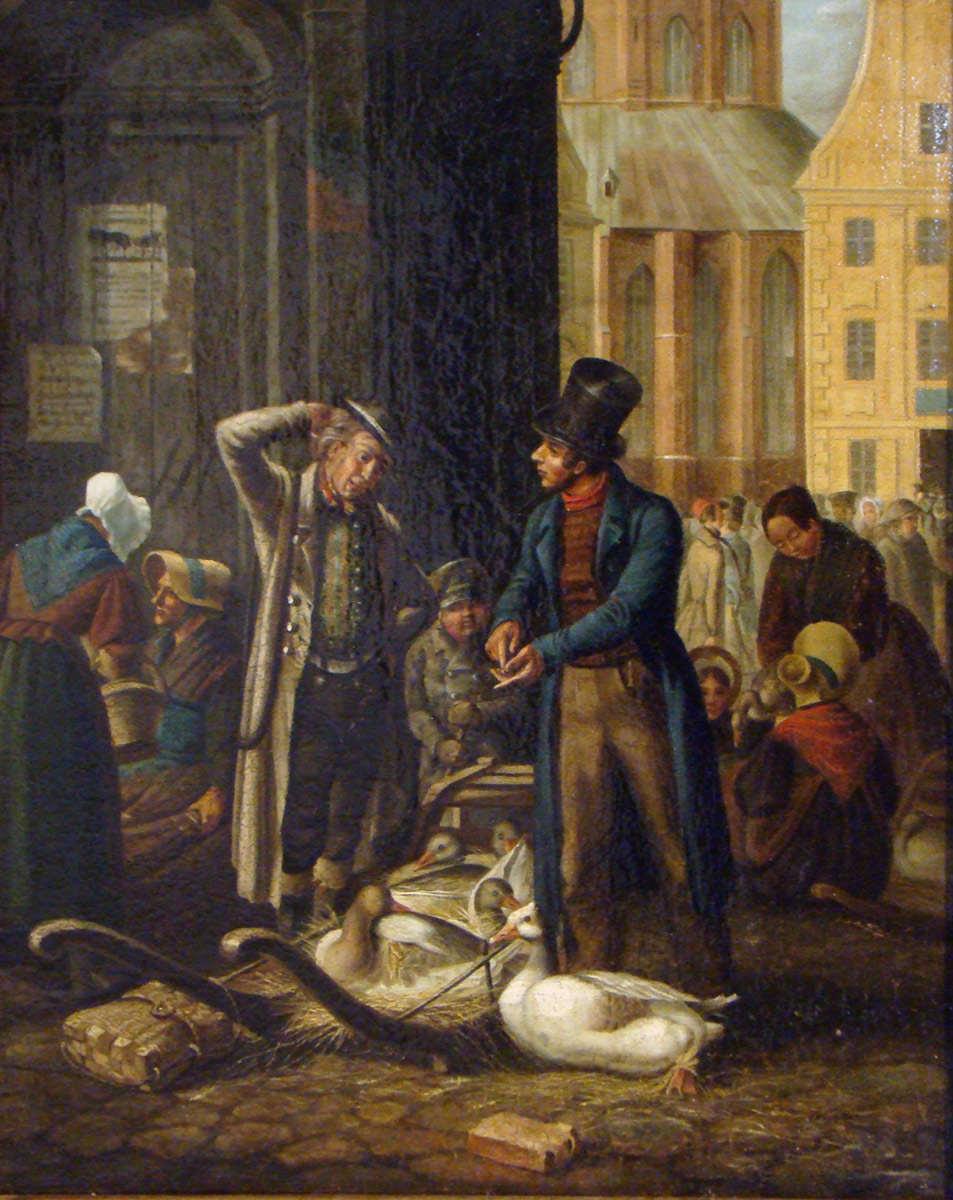
At the New Market in Rostock

Paul Ludwig Philipp Wilhelm Tischbein (12 July 1820 – 17 May 1874) was a German illustrator and painter; primarily of landscapes and genre scenes. He was a member of the Tischbein family of artists.

== Biography ==
He was born in Rostock. His father was the painter, August Albrecht Christian Tischbein. His brother, Albrecht was an engineer and shipbuilder.

In 1848, he began his formal studies at the Berlin University of the Arts and continued at the Dresden Academy of Fine Arts. After graduating, he became an art teacher. From 1861 to 1869, he taught at the "Große Stadtschule", a gymnasium devoted to the humanities in Rostock.

In addition to his paintings, he created lithographs of people in military uniforms and traditional folk costumes. In the 1870s, he produced illustrations for several works by the Low-German comic writer, John Brinckman.

Tischbein died in Rostock in 1874.

== Sources ==
- Thieme-Becker: Allgemeines Lexikon der bildenden Künstler, Vol.33, Leipzig 1939, pg.213
- Grewolls, Grete (2011). Wer war wer in Mecklenburg und Vorpommern. Das Personenlexikon (in German). Rostock: Hinstorff Verlag. p. 10157. ISBN 978-3-356-01301-6.
