= Tischbein =

Tischbein is a German surname. It may refer to:

- Various painters, engravers, lithographers etc., from the Tischbein family of artists, originating in Haina, Germany.
- Notable non-artists from the same family:
  - Albrecht Tischbein (1803–1881), German engineer and shipbuilder
  - Peter Friedrich Ludwig Tischbein (1813–1883), German forester, paleontologist and entomologist
- Emil Tischbein, the title character in Emil and the Detectives by Erich Kästner
- Willy Tischbein (1871–1946), German industrialist and professional cyclist
