= A Farmer's Life =

1965 film

- Directed by: Erik Balling
- Written by: Erik Balling; Paul Sarauw
- Based on: From My Farming Days by Fritz Reuter
- Produced by: Bo Christensen; Henning Karmark
- Starring: Lone Hertz; Morten Grunwald; Ellen Winther Lembourn
- Cinematography: Jørgen Skov
- Music by: Kai Normann Andersen
- Production company: Nordisk Film
- Distributed by: ASA Film
- Release date: 1 October 1965
- Running time: 108 minutes
- Country: Denmark
- Language: Danish

A Farmer's Life (Danish: Landmandsliv) is a 1965 Danish comedy film directed by Erik Balling and starring Lone Hertz, Morten Grunwald and Ellen Winther Lembourn. It is based on the classic German novel From My Farming Days by Fritz Reuter, and Fleming Lynge's operetta inspired by the novel.

The film's sets were designed by the art director Henning Bahs.

== Cast ==
- Lone Hertz as Marie Møller
- Morten Grunwald as Frits Triddlefitz
- Ellen Winther Lembourn as Louise Havermann
- Pouel Kern as Karl Havermann
- Frits Helmuth as Grev Frantz
- Holger Juul Hansen as Grev Axel von Rambow
- Helle Virkner as Grevinde Frida von Rambow
- Helge Kjærulff-Schmidt as Zakarias Bræsig
- Poul Reichhardt as 'Fukse' Frederiksen
- Hans Kurt as Markus 'Mukke' Mackenfeldt
- Kirsten Walther as Elvira Victoria Cornelia 'Hønse' Hansen
- Ernst Meyer as Jokum
- Lise Thomsen as Kvinde der danser med Frederiksen
- Kirsten Søberg as Kokkepigen
- Henny Lindorff Buckhøj as Gæst på godset

== Bibliography ==
- John Sundholm. Historical Dictionary of Scandinavian Cinema. Scarecrow Press, 2012.
