= Stavenhagen (Amt) =

Municipality in Mecklenburg-Vorpommern, Germany

- Amt
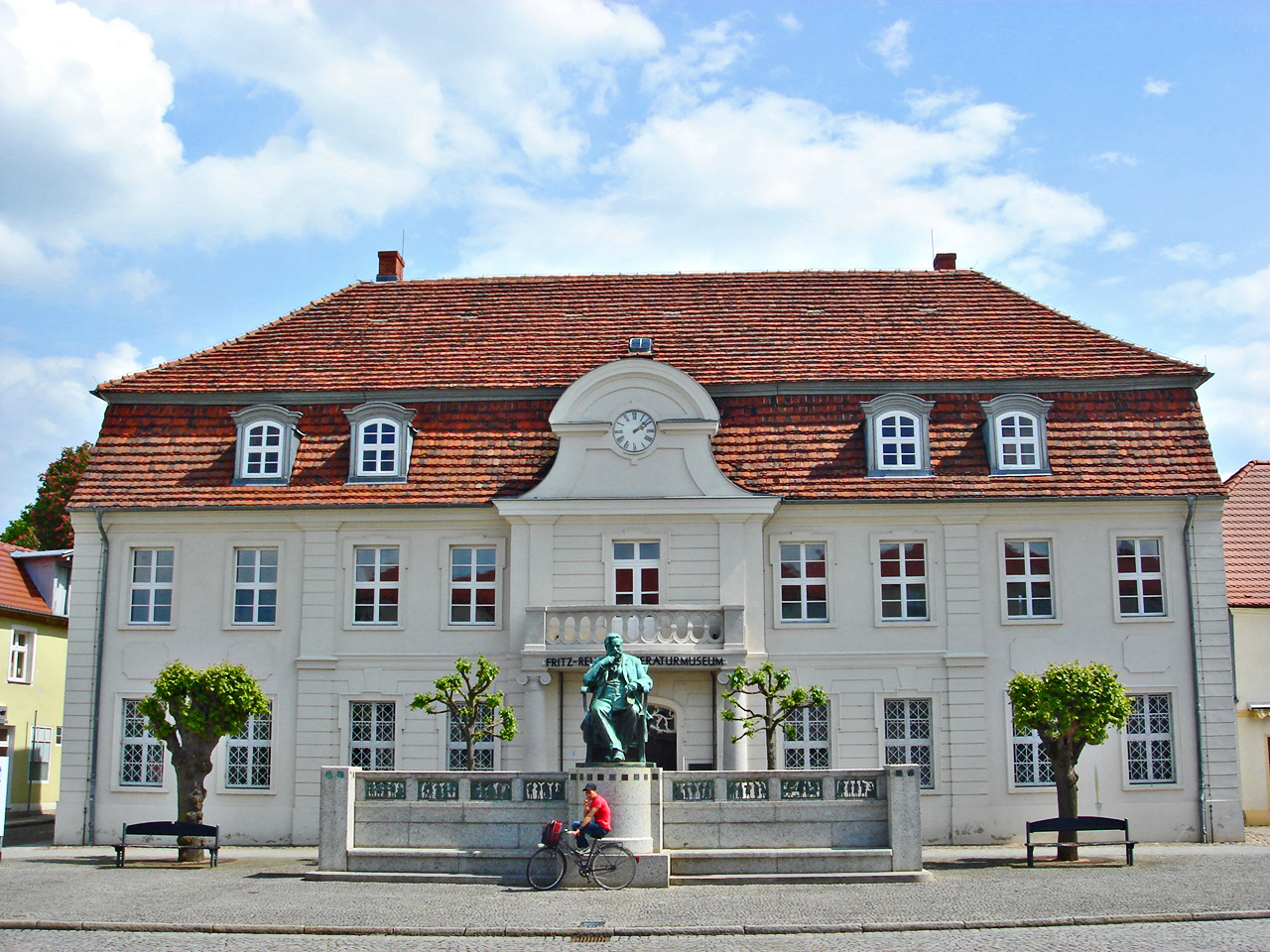
- Stavenhagen former town hall

- Map of Mecklenburgische Seenplatte highlighting Stavenhagen
- Interactive map of Stavenhagen
- Location within Germany Location within Mecklenburg-Vorpommern
- Coordinates: 53°40′N 12°58′E
- Country: Germany
- State: Mecklenburg-Vorpommern
- District: Mecklenburgische Seenplatte
- Seat: Stavenhagen
- Subdivisions: 13 municipalities

Area
  - Total: 307.72 km^{2} (118.81 sq mi)

Population (2025-12-31)
  - Total: 10,782
  - Density: 35.038/km^{2} (90.749/sq mi)
- Time zone: UTC+01:00 (CET)
  - Summer (DST): UTC+02:00 (CEST)
- Website: www.stavenhagen.de

Stavenhagen is an Amt in the Mecklenburgische Seenplatte district, in Mecklenburg-Vorpommern, Germany. The seat of the Amt is in Stavenhagen.

The Amt Stavenhagen consists of the following municipalities:

1. Bredenfelde
2. Briggow
3. Grammentin
4. Gülzow
5. Ivenack
6. Jürgenstorf
7. Kittendorf
8. Knorrendorf
9. Mölln
10. Ritzerow
11. Rosenow
12. Stavenhagen
13. Zettemin
