= From My Farming Days =

Novel by Fritz Reuter

- Author: Fritz Reuter
- Language: low German
- Genre: Drama
- Publication date: 1862-1964
- Media type: Print

From My Farming Days (Low German: Ut mine Stromtid) is a novel by Fritz Reuter, originally published in three volumes between 1862 and 1864. Written in Low German, it portrays life in rural Mecklenburg in the 1840s in the context of the Revolutions of 1848. The novel was autobiographically-inspired as Reuter had himself worked as an apprentice farmer during the era. In 1878 it was translated into English by M.W. MacDowell.

Although not the main character, the genial land inspector "Onkel" Zacharias Bräsig became the most well-known and his role was often emphasised in adaptations of the story.

== Adaptations ==
The story was one of Reuter's most successful works and has been adapted into other media a number of times including:

- During My Apprenticeship, a 1919 German silent film
- Life in the Country, a 1924 Swedish silent film
- Struggle for the Soil, a 1925 German silent film
- Uncle Bräsig, a 1936 German film
- Life in the Country, a 1943 Swedish film
- A Farmer's Life, a 1965 Danish film
- Uncle Bräsig, a West German television series between 1978 and 1980

== Bibliography ==
- Goble, Alan. The Complete Index to Literary Sources in Film. Walter de Gruyter, 1999.
- Mews, Siegfried & Hardin, James N. Nineteenth-century German Writers, 1841-1900. Gale Research, 1993.
