= Jürgenstorf =

- Municipality
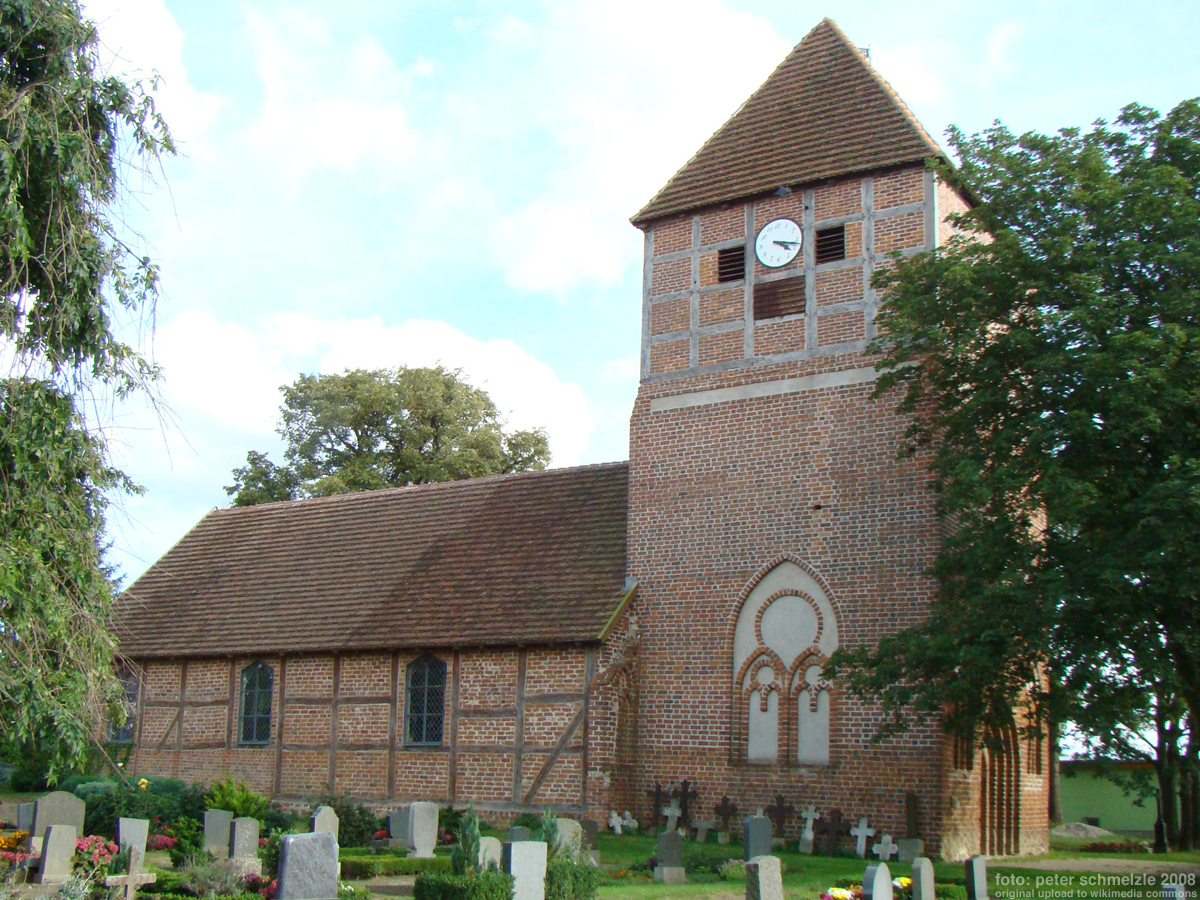
- Church

- Location of Jürgenstorf within Mecklenburgische Seenplatte district
- Interactive map of Jürgenstorf
- Location within Germany Location within Mecklenburg-Vorpommern
- Coordinates: 53°40′N 12°54′E
- Country: Germany
- State: Mecklenburg-Vorpommern
- District: Mecklenburgische Seenplatte
- Municipal assoc.: Stavenhagen
- Subdivisions: 4

Government
  - Mayor: Gertrud Rehfeld

Area
  - Total: 22.36 km^{2} (8.63 sq mi)
- Elevation: 64 m (210 ft)

Population (2025-12-31)
  - Total: 862
  - Density: 38.6/km^{2} (99.8/sq mi)
- Time zone: UTC+01:00 (CET)
  - Summer (DST): UTC+02:00 (CEST)
- Postal codes: 17153
- Dialling codes: 039955
- Vehicle registration: DM
- Website: www.stavenhagen.de

Jürgenstorf is a municipality in the Mecklenburgische Seenplatte district, in Mecklenburg-Vorpommern, Germany.
