= Struggle for the Soil =

1925 film directed by Erich Waschneck

- Directed by: Erich Waschneck
- Written by: Willy Rath; Erich Waschneck
- Based on: From My Farming Days by Fritz Reuter
- Starring: Gustav Oberg; Ferdinand von Alten; Oskar Marion
- Cinematography: Friedl Behn-Grund
- Production company: UFA
- Distributed by: UFA
- Release date: 27 January 1925
- Country: Germany
- Languages: Silent; German intertitles

Struggle for the Soil (German: Kampf um die Scholle) is a 1925 German silent film directed by Erich Waschneck and starring Gustav Oberg, Ferdinand von Alten, and Oskar Marion. It is based on the classic novel From My Farming Days by Fritz Reuter.

The film's art direction was by Botho Hoefer, Hans Minzloff, and Bernhard Schwidewski. It was shot on location in Lensahn in Holstein.

== Cast ==
- Gustav Oberg as Herbert von Wulfshagen
- Ferdinand von Alten as Axel von Wulfshagen
- Oskar Marion as Franz von Wulfshagen
- Margarete Schön as Franz von Wulfshagen
- Otto Kronburger as Gutsinspektor Kart Merten
- Mary Parker as Luise Merten
- Hans Hermann Schaufuß as Fritz Quirlitz
- Wilhelm Diegelmann as Onkel Uhl
- Viktor Schwannecke as Paul Großkopp
- Emil Rameau as Moses Hirsch
- Erich Schönfelder as David Hirsch
- Rudolf Klein-Rhoden as Alter Schäfer Thies
- Walter Formes as Knecht
- Rolf Brunner as Trainer
- Karl Harbacher

== Bibliography ==
- Bock, Hans-Michael; Bergfelder, Tim, eds. (2009). The Concise Cinegraph: Encyclopaedia of German Cinema. New York: Berghahn Books. ISBN 978-1-57181-655-9.
