= Fritz Hollenbeck =

German actor (1929–2021)

- Born: 23 October 1929; Lübz, Mecklenburg-Vorpommern, Germany
- Died: 2 June 2021 (aged 91)
- Occupation: Actor
- Years active: 1957–2020s (film & TV)

Fritz Hollenbeck (23 October 1929 – 2 June 2021) was a German actor, primarily of television. His best known work is the title role in the television series Uncle Bräsig between 1978 and 1980. He married the actress Rotraud Conrad.

== Selected filmography ==
- Der Attentäter (1969, TV film)
- Hamburg Transit (1971, TV series)
- Einmal im Leben – Geschichte eines Eigenheims (1972, TV miniseries)
- Bauern, Bonzen und Bomben (1973, TV series)
- Knife in the Back (1975)
- Uncle Bräsig (1978–1980, TV series)
- Helga und die Nordlichter (1984, TV series)
- The Country Doctor (1987–2001, TV series)

== Bibliography ==
- Jovan Evermann. Der Serien-Guide: M-S. Schwarzkopf & Schwarzkopf, 1999.
