= August Albrecht Christian Tischbein =

German painter and lithographer (1768-1848)

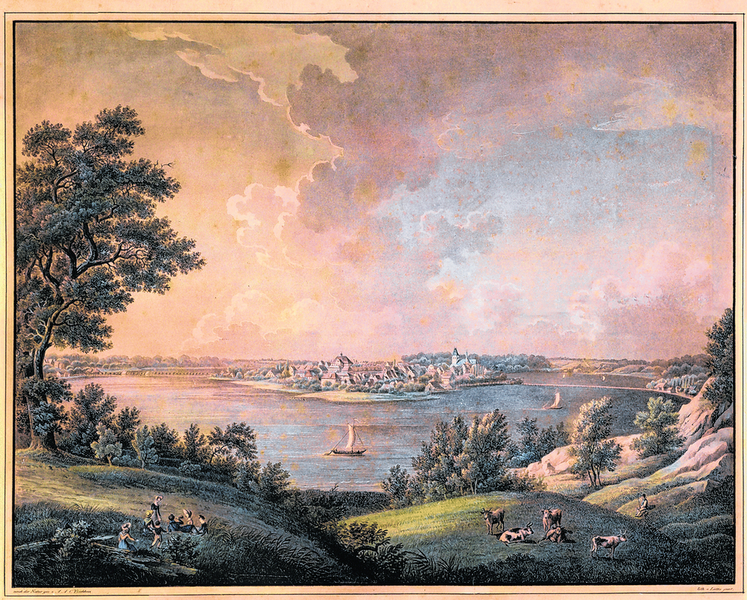
View of Ratzeburg (1824)

August Albrecht Christian Tischbein (29 July 1768, Hamburg - 10 September 1848, Rostock) was a German painter and lithographer from the Tischbein family of artists.

== Biography ==
He was the son of Johann Jacob Tischbein, known as the Lübecker Tischbein. From 1786 to 1788, he studied with his uncle Johann Heinrich Tischbein (the Kasseler Tischbein). From 1792 to 1803, he worked in Lübeck. After 1803, he lived in the small town of Sternberg in Mecklenburg, where his son Albrecht was born; one of the few Tischbeins who did not pursue a career in art.

After 1805, he opened his main studio in Rostock. In 1814, he helped revise the map of Tarnow. After 1829, he worked as a drawing teacher. His architectural drawings and cityscapes of Lübeck and Rostock are considered to be of great historical importance.

His other sons, Paul and August Anton (1805-c.1867), followed the family tradition and became painters.

== Writings ==
- Grundriss der Stadt Rostock mit den nächsten Umgebungen aufgenommen (Plan of Rostock and the immediate vicinities), Rostock 1814
- Denkmale altdeutscher Baukunst in Lübeck (Old German monuments in Lübeck), maps made together with the architect, Johann Heinrich Schlösser (1802–1887), Lübeck 1830 and 1832

== Sources ==
- Grewolls, Grete (2011). Wer war wer in Mecklenburg und Vorpommern. Das Personenlexikon (in German). Rostock: Hinstorff Verlag. p. 10153. ISBN 978-3-356-01301-6.
