= Rosenow =

- Municipality
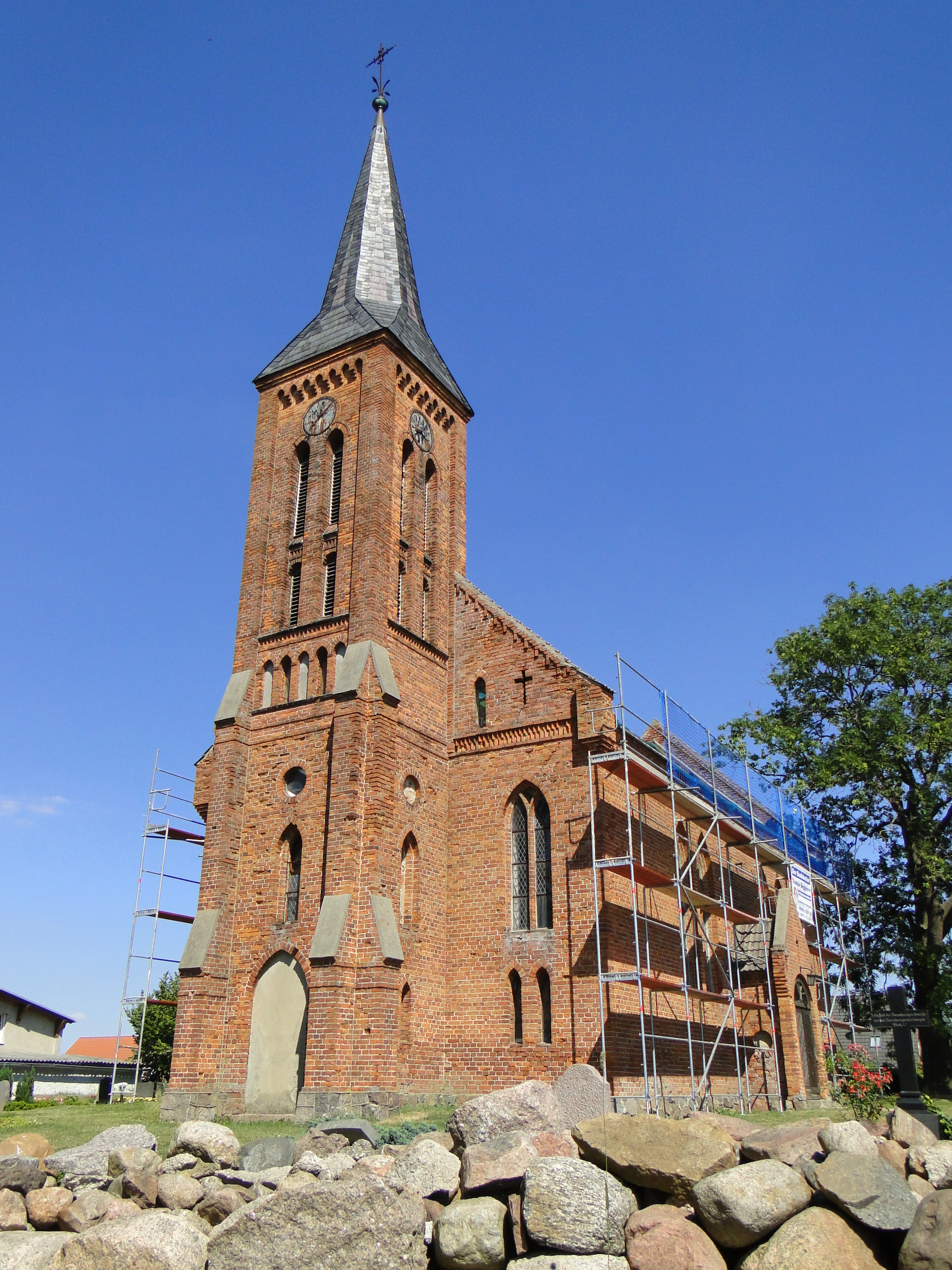
- Rosenow Church

- Coat of arms

- Location of Rosenow within Mecklenburgische Seenplatte district
- Interactive map of Rosenow
- Location within Germany Location within Mecklenburg-Vorpommern
- Coordinates: 53°38′N 13°02′E
- Country: Germany
- State: Mecklenburg-Vorpommern
- District: Mecklenburgische Seenplatte
- Municipal assoc.: Stavenhagen
- Subdivisions: 6

Government
  - Mayor: Wolf-Rüdiger Hensel

Area
  - Total: 31.13 km^{2} (12.02 sq mi)
- Elevation: 69 m (226 ft)

Population (2025-12-31)
  - Total: 1,008
  - Density: 32.38/km^{2} (83.86/sq mi)
- Time zone: UTC+01:00 (CET)
  - Summer (DST): UTC+02:00 (CEST)
- Postal codes: 17091
- Dialling codes: 039602
- Vehicle registration: DM
- Website: www.stavenhagen.de

Rosenow is a municipality in the Mecklenburgische Seenplatte district, in Mecklenburg-Vorpommern, Germany.
