= Erich Waschneck =

German film director (1887–1970)

Erich John Waschneck (29 April 1887 – 22 September 1970) was a German cameraman, director, screenwriter, and film producer.

== Early life ==
Waschneck was born on 29 April 1887 in Grimma, Kingdom of Saxony, the son of Karl Hermann Waschneck, a blacksmith, and his wife Therese Emilie, née Schneider. After graduating from high school he went to the Academy of Fine Arts Leipzig and studied painting.

== Career ==
Waschneck came in contact with the film industry in 1907 when he began to paint posters for films. He then worked as a still photographer and later as a camera assistant to cinematographer Fritz Arno Wagner.

In 1921, he did his first work as a cameraman in the adaptation of the fairy tale Little Muck (German: Die Kleine Muck) by Wilhelm Hauff. Until 1924, he was involved in numerous other productions as a cinematographer. From 1924 he worked as a director. His first directorial effort was the feature film Struggle for the Soil (German: Kampf um die Scholle) (1925), for which he also co-wrote the screenplay. His film Eight Girls in a Boat (German: Acht Mädels im Boot (1932) won the Gold Medal at the Venice Film Festival.

In 1932 he became managing director of Fanal-Film-Produktion GmbH in Berlin and a film producer.

After the Nazis seized power, Waschneck joined the National Socialist Factory Cell Organization (German: Nationalsozialistische Betriebszellenorganisation) of German-born film directors on 4 April 1933. In 1940, he directed the antisemitic propaganda film The Rothschilds (German: Die Rothschilds).

After the war Waschneck directed only three more films.

== Personal life ==
Waschneck and the actress Karin Hardt married in 1933. He died on 22 September 1970 in Berlin, and is buried in the old cemetery in Wannsee.

== Selected filmography ==
- The Pearl of the Orient (1921)
- Love at the Wheel (1921)
- Barmaid (1922)
- The Girl with the Mask (1922)
- A Glass of Water (1923)
- The Chain Clinks (1923)
- The New Land (1924)
- The Stolen Professor (1924)
- Struggle for the Soil (1925)
- My Friend the Chauffeur (1926)
- The Man in the Fire (1926)
- Regine (1927)
- The Woman with the World Record (1927)
- Aftermath (1927)
- Sajenko the Soviet (1928)
- Docks of Hamburg (1928)
- Scandal in Baden-Baden (1929)
- Favorite of Schonbrunn (1929)
- Diane (1929)
- The Love of the Brothers Rott (1929)
- Two People (1930)
- Sacred Waters (1932)
- Eight Girls in a Boat (1932)
- Impossible Love (1932)
- Hands from the Darkness (German: Hände aus dem Dunkel) (1933)
- Adventure on the Southern Express (1934)
- Music in the Blood (1934)
- Regine (1935)
- My Life for Maria Isabella (1935)
- Lovers – Hermann and Dorothea of Today (German: Liebesleute – Hermann und Dorothea von Heute) (1935), awarded: "artistically valuable"
- Uncle Bräsig (1936)
- Escapade (1936)
- Thunderstorm Flight to Claudia (Gewitterflug zu Claudia) (1937)
- The Divine Jetta (1937)
- Anna Favetti (1938)
- Women for Golden Hill (1938)
- Password Machine (German: Kennwort Machin) (1939)
- The Rothschilds (1940)
- Between Hamburg and Haiti (1940)
- The Roedern Affair (1944)
- Thank You, I'm Fine (1948)
- Three Days of Fear (1952)
- Have Sunshine in Your Heart (1953)

== See also ==
- Weniger, Kay (2001). Das große Personenlexikon des Films. Die Schauspieler, Regisseure, Kameraleute, Produzenten, Komponisten, Drehbuchautoren, Filmarchitekten, Ausstatter, Kostümbildner, Cutter, Tontechniker, Maskenbildner und Special Effects Designer des 20. Jahrhunderts [The comprehensive biographical dictionary of film. The actors, directors, cinematographers, producers, composers, screenwriters, production designers, set designers, costume designers, editors, sound engineers, makeup artists, and special effects designers of the 20th century.] (in German). Berlin: Schwarzkopf und Schwarzkopf. ISBN 3-89602-340-3.
