= Stavenhagen =

Town in Mecklenburg-Vorpommern, Germany

- Town
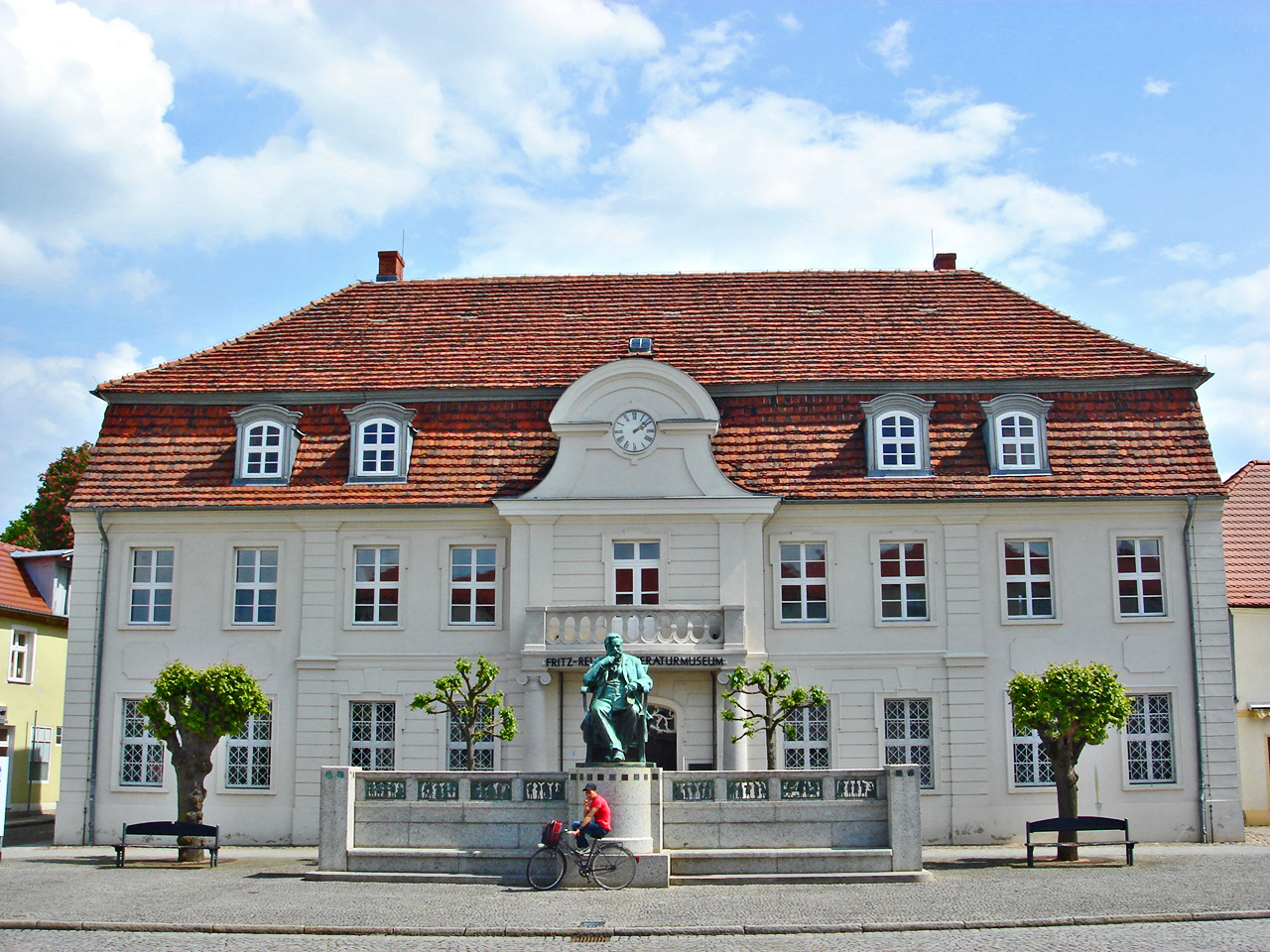
- Fritz-Reuter-Literaturmuseum at the market square of Stavenhagen

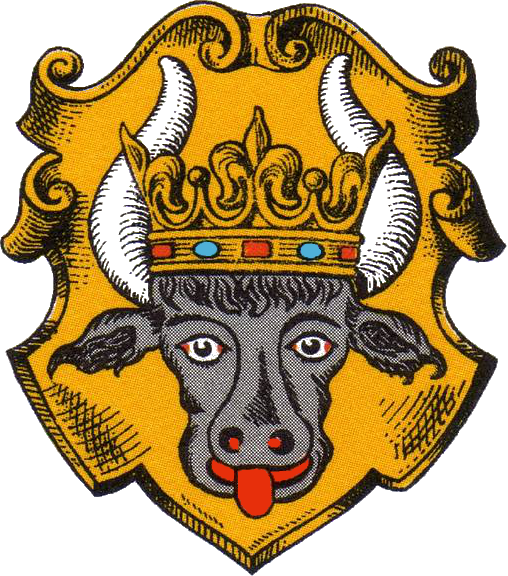
- Coat of arms

- Location of Stavenhagen within Mecklenburgische Seenplatte district
- Interactive map of Stavenhagen
- Location within Germany Location within Mecklenburg-Vorpommern
- Coordinates: 53°42′N 12°54′E
- Country: Germany
- State: Mecklenburg-Vorpommern
- District: Mecklenburgische Seenplatte
- Municipal assoc.: Stavenhagen
- Subdivisions: 8

Government
  - Mayor: Stefan Guzu

Area
  - Total: 40.84 km^{2} (15.77 sq mi)
- Elevation: 45 m (148 ft)

Population (2025-12-31)
  - Total: 5,116
  - Density: 125.3/km^{2} (324.4/sq mi)
- Time zone: UTC+01:00 (CET)
  - Summer (DST): UTC+02:00 (CEST)
- Postal codes: 17153
- Dialling codes: 039954
- Vehicle registration: DM
- Website: www.stavenhagen.de

Stavenhagen (German pronunciation: [ʃtafn̩ˈhaːɡn̩]; Low German: Stemhagen) is a municipality in the Mecklenburgische Seenplatte district, in Mecklenburg-Vorpommern, Germany. It is situated 28 km northwest of Neubrandenburg.

== Subdivisions ==
Stavenhagen is divided into following parts:

- Amtsbrink
- Basepohl
- Klockow
- Kölpin
- Neubauhof
- Pribbenow
- Stavenhof
- Wüstgrabow

== History ==
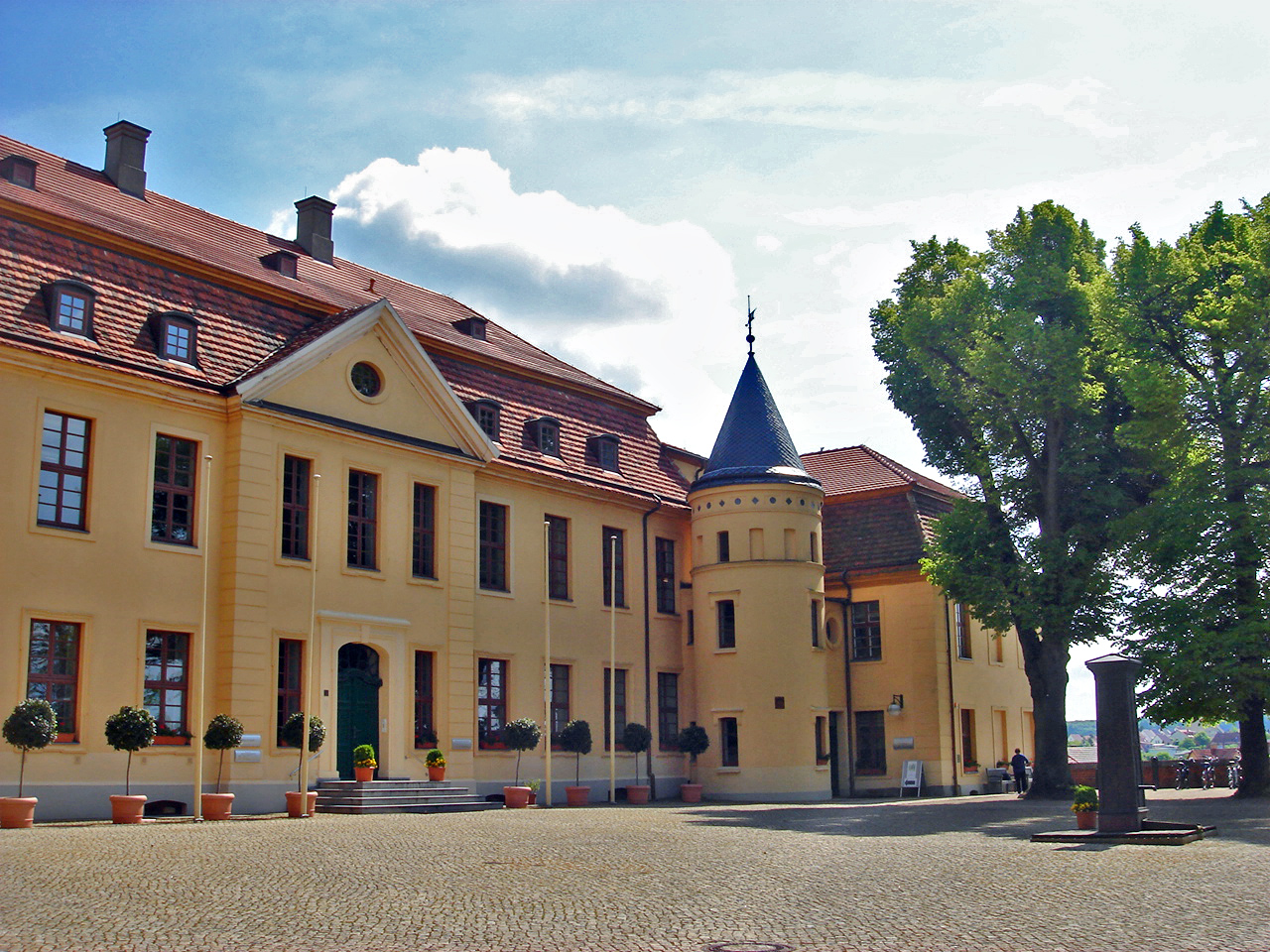
Schloss Stavenhagen (baroque castle)

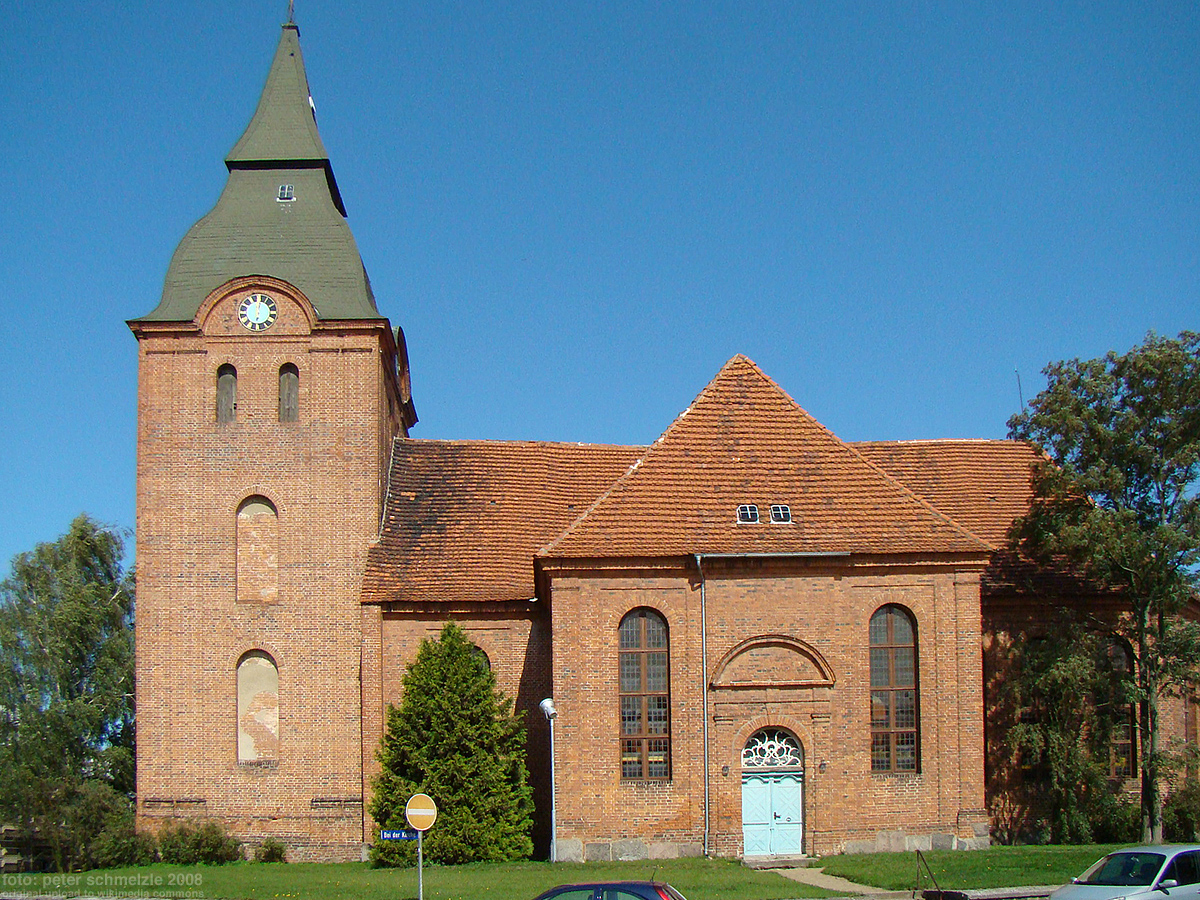
Baroque brick church of Stavenhagen

The town is first mentioned in 1230 under the name of Stovenhage.

The town was destroyed towards the end of the Thirty Years' War in 1648. Large fires in the years 1727 and 1746 also destroyed large parts of the town.

Today's Schloss Stavenhagen (Stavenhagen Castle) was built in 1740 on the premises of an earlier fort. The town's church was re-built between 1774 and 1790 and also a new town hall was erected in 1788. The first lager beer brewery in Mecklenburg was founded in Stavenhagen in the first half of the 19th century.

Fritz Reuter, a notable author (his works were among the best selling of his time), was born in 1810 as son of the mayor. Reuter is regarded one of the most prominent authors of Low German literature.

In 1864, Stavenhagen gained access to the railway network. The station is on the Buetzow-Szczecin line.

Industrial developments at the turn of the 19th century were a sugar factory, a steam mill, a brick factory, a power station, a hospital and a fire station.

Since 1960, the town features a museum dedicated to Fritz Reuter called Fritz-Reuter-Literaturmuseum.

The GDR's National People's Army opened a military base at Basepohl in 1974.

== Attractions ==
- Fritz-Reuter-Literaturmuseum and the Fritz Reuter monument
- Schloss Stavenhagen (Stavenhagen Castle)
- old synagogue, one of very few in Mecklenburgs that survived the Nazi era (open to visitors)
- Ivenacker Eichen - oak trees more than 1000 years old

== Notable people ==
- Fritz Reuter (1810–1874), author, contributor to Low German literature.
- Anke Behmer (born 1961), former East German athlete who competed mainly in the heptathlon.
- Bert Papenfuß-Gorek (born 1956), a German poet and author
- Ralf Bartels (born 1978), a German shot putter.

== Enterprises ==
- Aviko Rixona Stavenhagen [Pfanni]
- Pommernland Fleisch- und Wurstwaren GmbH
- Immergut Dauermilch GmbH
- Netto Supermarkt GmbH (headquarters for Germany)
- Ski GmbH

== Town twinning ==
- Preetz, Schleswig-Holstein (since 1990)
- Werdohl, North Rhine-Westphalia (since 1990)
- Šilalė, Lithuania (since 1994)
