= Kittendorf =

- Municipality
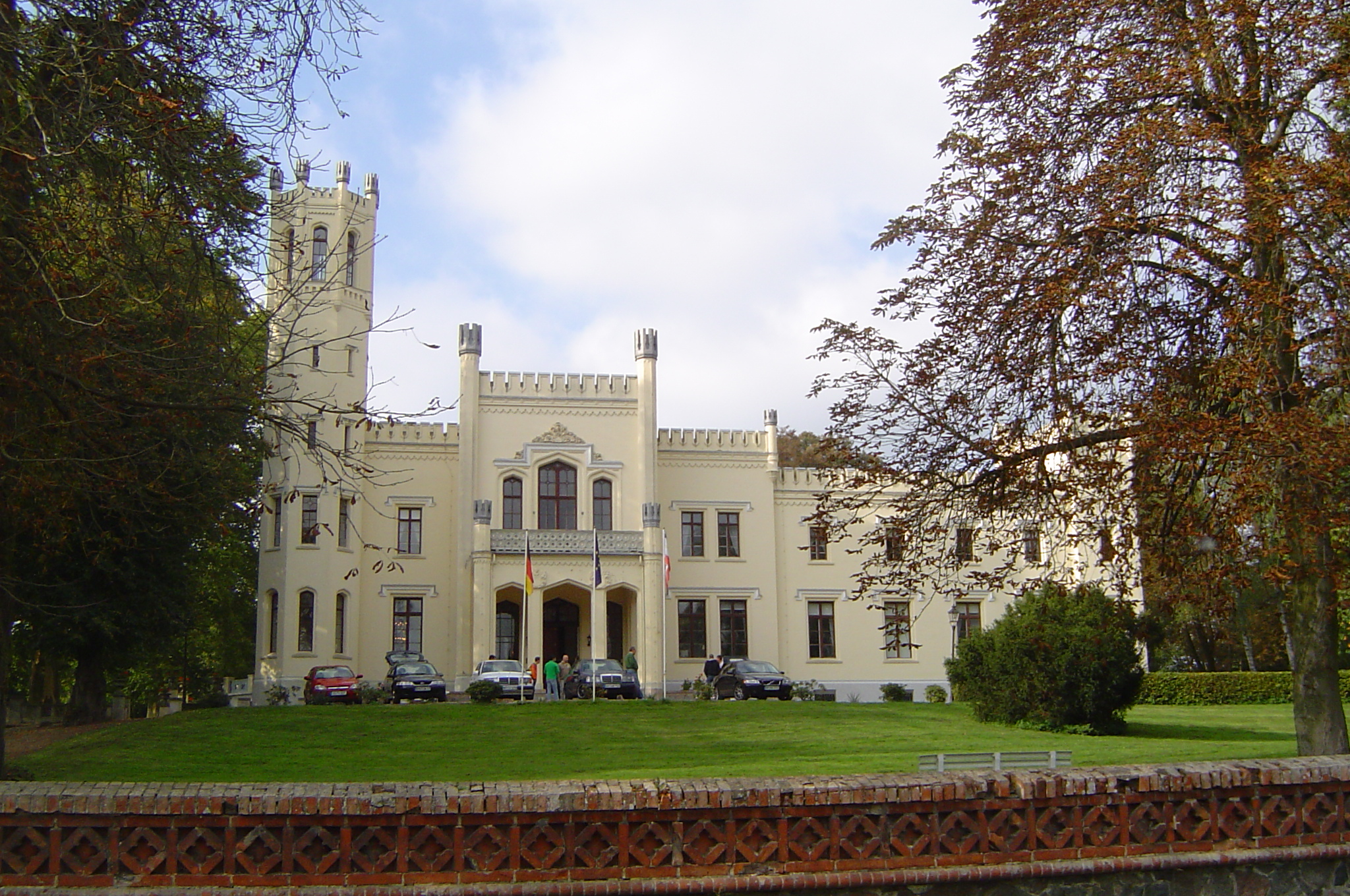
- Kittendorf Castle (built in 1853)

- Location of Kittendorf within Mecklenburgische Seenplatte district
- Interactive map of Kittendorf
- Location within Germany Location within Mecklenburg-Vorpommern
- Coordinates: 53°37′N 12°52′E
- Country: Germany
- State: Mecklenburg-Vorpommern
- District: Mecklenburgische Seenplatte
- Municipal assoc.: Stavenhagen
- Subdivisions: 5

Government
  - Mayor: Inge Maischak

Area
  - Total: 21.11 km^{2} (8.15 sq mi)
- Elevation: 53 m (174 ft)

Population (2025-12-31)
  - Total: 269
  - Density: 12.7/km^{2} (33.0/sq mi)
- Time zone: UTC+01:00 (CET)
  - Summer (DST): UTC+02:00 (CEST)
- Postal codes: 17153
- Dialling codes: 039955
- Vehicle registration: DM
- Website: www.stavenhagen.de

Kittendorf is a municipality in the Mecklenburgische Seenplatte district, in Mecklenburg-Vorpommern, Germany.
