= Ivenack =

- Municipality
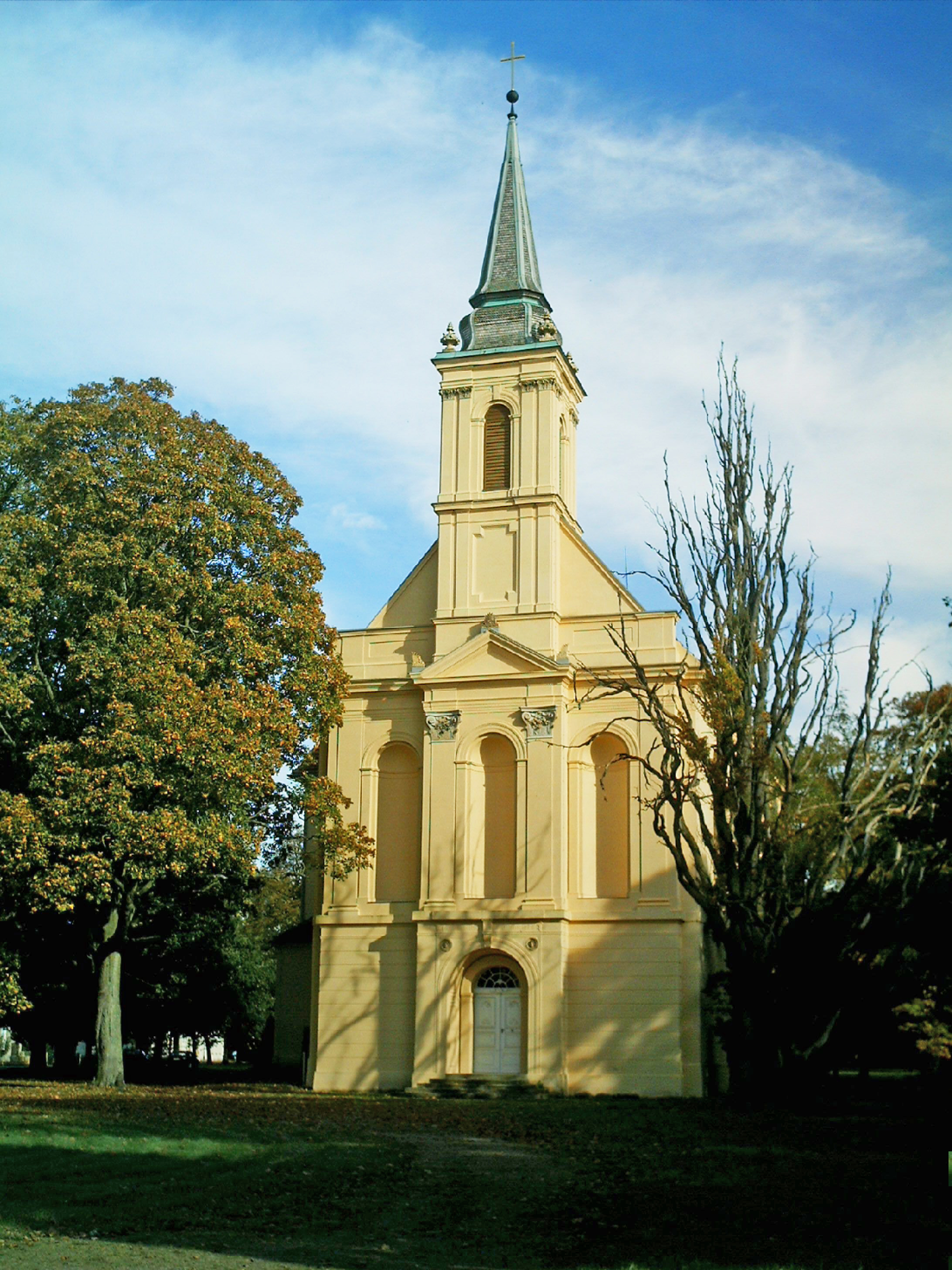
- Baroque church of Ivenack, part of the palace garden

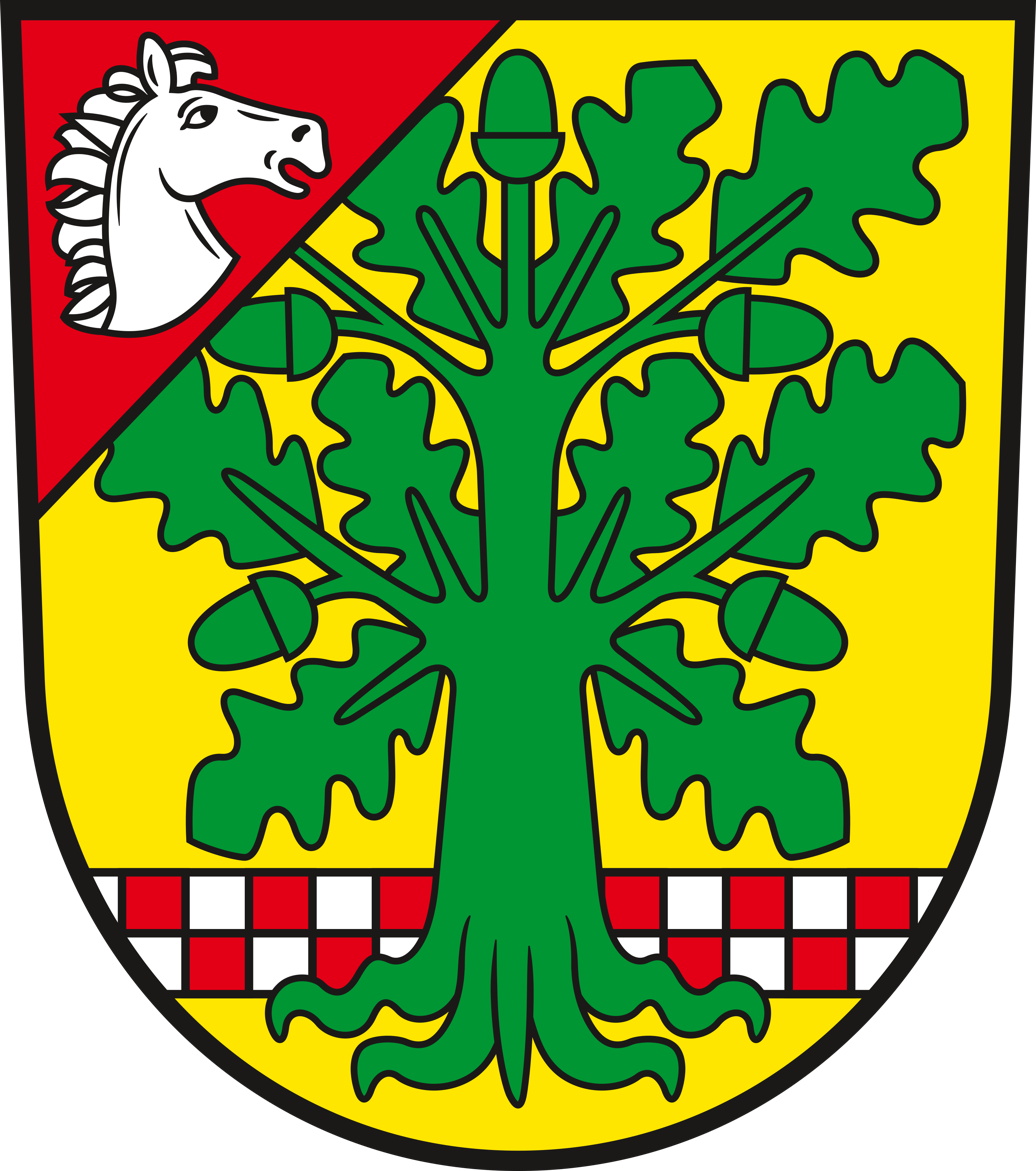
- Coat of arms

- Location of Ivenack within Mecklenburgische Seenplatte district
- Interactive map of Ivenack
- Location within Germany Location within Mecklenburg-Vorpommern
- Coordinates: 53°43′N 12°58′E
- Country: Germany
- State: Mecklenburg-Vorpommern
- District: Mecklenburgische Seenplatte
- Municipal assoc.: Stavenhagen
- Subdivisions: 6

Government
  - Mayor: Stefan Guzu

Area
  - Total: 39.60 km^{2} (15.29 sq mi)
- Elevation: 53 m (174 ft)

Population (2025-12-31)
  - Total: 783
  - Density: 19.8/km^{2} (51.2/sq mi)
- Time zone: UTC+01:00 (CET)
  - Summer (DST): UTC+02:00 (CEST)
- Postal codes: 17153
- Dialling codes: 039954
- Vehicle registration: DM
- Website: www.stavenhagen.de

Ivenack is a municipality in the Mecklenburgische Seenplatte district, in Mecklenburg-Vorpommern, Germany.

Ivenack boasts Germany's first National Natural Monument; the 164 ha Ivenacker Tiergarten (transl. Animal garden of Ivenack). This garden hosts 5 oak trees believed to be several thousand years old- including Germany's oldest surviving tree; named Quercus robus.
