= John Brinckman =

German author (1814–1870)

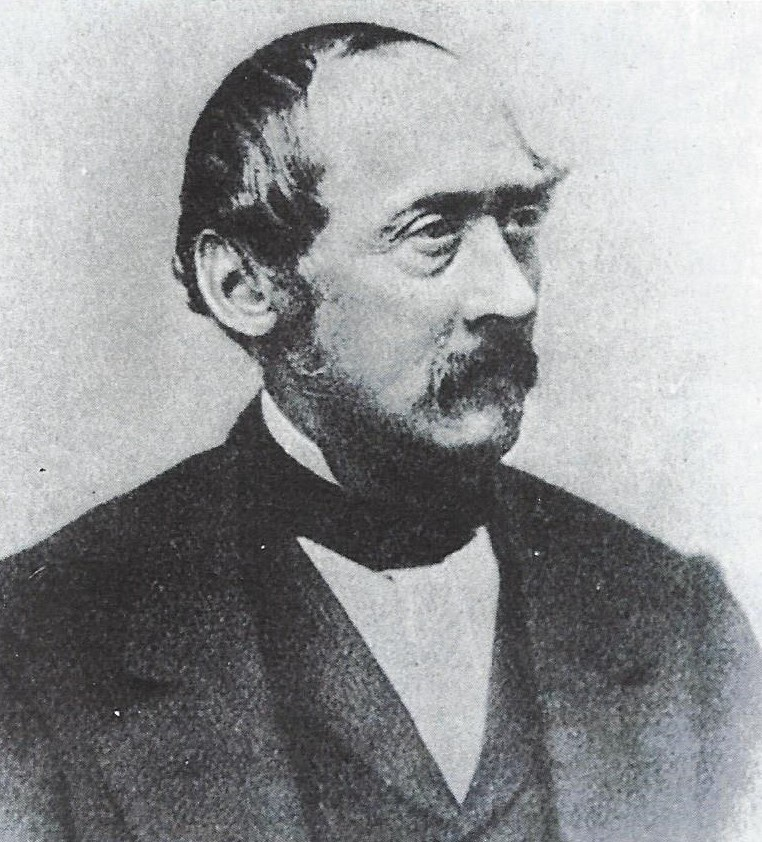
John Brinckman (date unknown)

John Brinckman, originally Johann Friedrich Brinckmann (3 July 1814, Rostock – 20 September 1870, Güstrow) was a German author of humorous works in Plattdeutsch.

== Biography ==
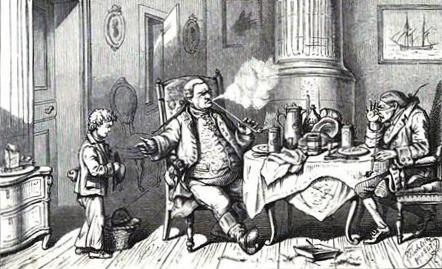
Illustration from Kasper Ohm un ick, by Paul Tischbein

He was the second of nine children born to Caspar Christoph Michael Brinckmann (1786–1824), a sea captain, and his wife, Anna née Ruth (1794–1870), daughter of the Port Commander in Gothenburg. His father drowned in a shipwreck off Jutland when he was only ten. His education began in a private "Winkelschule", where one of his aunts was his teacher. In 1824, he entered the Große Stadtschule Rostock, from which he graduated ten years later.

Beginning in 1834, he was a student at the University of Rostock. In 1838, he served three months in prison for attempting to create an Anti-monarchist organization.. He requested and received a pardon from Grand Duke Paul Friedrich, but was unable to complete his studies and decided to go to the United States. He settled in New York City; remaining there until 1841. After surviving a case of yellow fever, he returned to Germany.

On the advice of his doctor, he went to live with his college friend, Gustav Lierow, a pastor in Lohmen. While staying in the rectory, Gustav and his brother, Ludwig, who was a clerk at Dobbertin Abbey, helped him seek employment. During his search, he met Elise Burmeister, the daughter of a doctor in Goldberg, who worked as a teacher there and would later become his wife.

From 1842 to 1844, he worked as a tutor for a noble family near Neukalen, but was displeased with the way he was treated; especially by the wife of the Chamberlain, who was apparently domineering and arrogant. After consulting with the manager of the Abbey, Carl Peter Johann von Le Fort, he was able to procure a position as a tutor for Le Fort's children. His situation there was satisfactory, and he was closer to Elise than before. They were married in 1846.

As a member of the Reformverein in Goldberg, and the author of several satirical poems, criticizing the conservative landowning nobility, he became involved in the German revolutions of 1848–1849. He and his fellow writer, Fritz Reuter, took part in the first demonstration in Güstrow. Shortly after, he applied for a vacancy at the Realschule there. After teaching a trial lesson, he was hired and moved his family to a modest apartment nearby. He and Elise eventually had ten children, forcing him to ask for advances to his salary, and take out loans. He also gave private lessons in his spare time. From 1856 to 1862, he was a member of a citizen's committee campaigning for better schools.

After 1854, he composed numerous poems, short stories, and assorted non-fiction works in Plattdeutsch. His writings were largely overshadowed by Reuter's, who also wrote in Plattdeutsch, and many of them did not become popular until after his death, which occurred in 1870, when he suffered a fatal stroke at the age of fifty-six. Several schools in Mecklenburg and a cargo ship (sank in 1926) were later named after him. From 1923 to 1966, the John-Brinckman-Preis was awarded for significant contributions to the study and preservation of Low German language and ethnicity. In 1990, the John Brinckman Gesellschaft was founded, with the goal of researching and preserving his works.

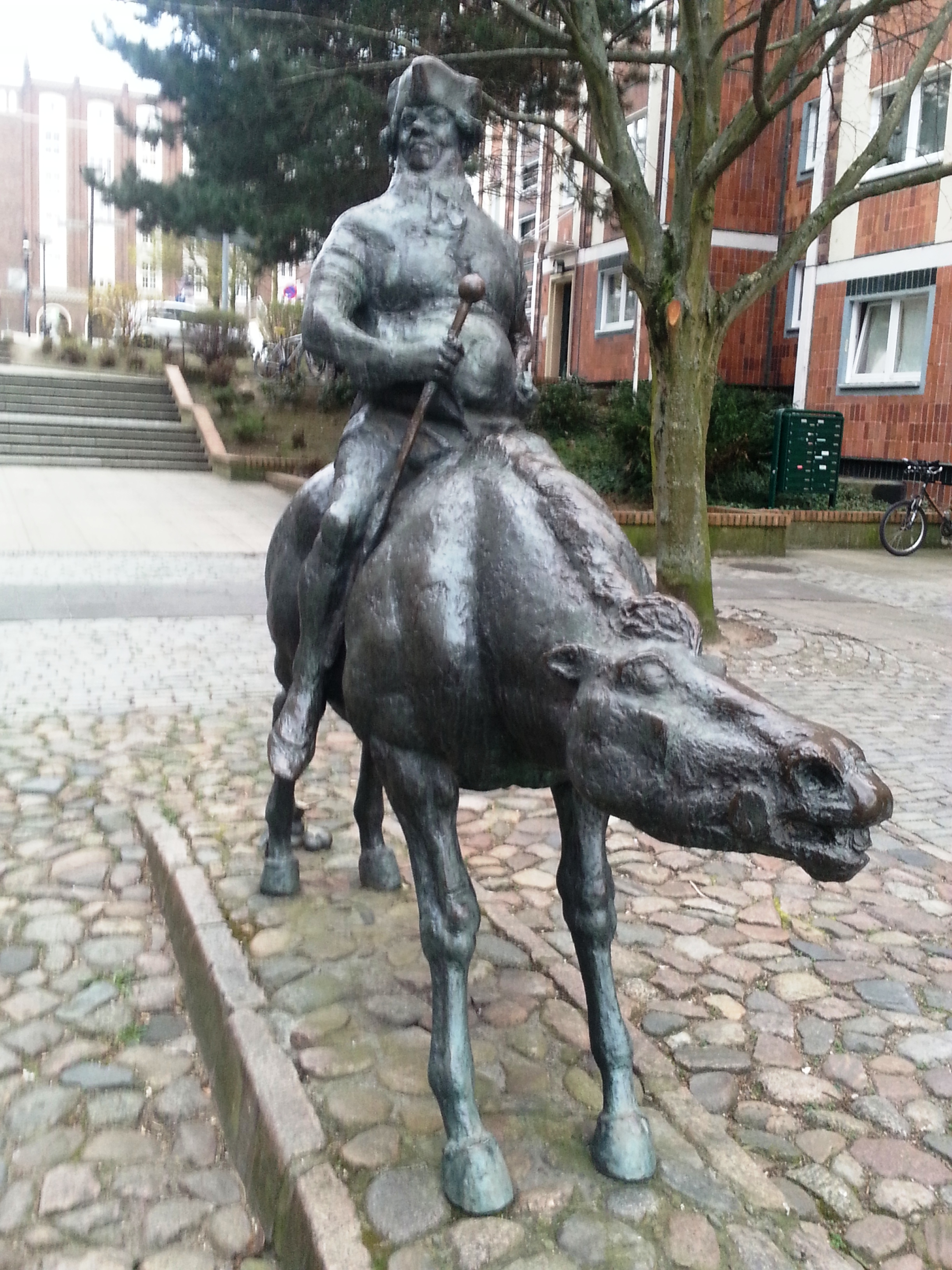
Kasper Ohm up sin Vosswallach (Uncle Kasper on his Chestnut Gelding) by Jo Jastram, from Brinckman's memoirs, in Rostock

== Selected works ==
- Kasper Ohm un ick. (Memories of his childhood, 1855–1868) (Online) Reissued in 1993 by Hinstorff ISBN 978-3-356-00523-3
- Vagel Grip. (Poetry, 1859) (Online) Reissued in 2008 by DirectMedia ISBN 978-3-86640-500-4
