= Uncle Bräsig =

1936 film

- Directed by: Erich Waschneck
- Written by: Rolf Meyer
- Based on: From My Farming Days by Fritz Reuter
- Produced by: Erich Waschneck
- Starring: Otto Wernicke; Heinrich Schroth; Harry Hardt; Suse Graf
- Cinematography: Georg Bruckbauer
- Music by: Kurt Schröder
- Production company: Fanal-Filmproduktion
- Distributed by: UFA
- Release date: 25 December 1936
- Country: Germany
- Language: German

Uncle Bräsig (German: Onkel Bräsig) is a 1936 German historical comedy film directed by Erich Waschneck and starring Otto Wernicke, Heinrich Schroth and Harry Hardt. It marked the film debut of the Swedish actress Kristina Söderbaum who went on to be a major star of Nazi cinema. Söderbaum won her part in a contest organised by UFA. The film was based on the 1862 novel From My Farming Days by Fritz Reuter. It was shot at the Grunewald Studios in Berlin with sets designed by the art director Robert A. Dietrich.

== Cast ==
- Otto Wernicke as Onkel Bräsig
- Heinrich Schroth as Karl Hawermann
- Harry Hardt as Baron Axel von Rambow
- Suse Graf as Luise Hawermann
- Elga Brink as Frau Frieda von Rambow
- Carsta Löck as Nahrhafte Mamsell
- Hans Richter as Triddelfitz, Volontär
- Fritz Hoopts as Jochen Nüssler
- Jakob Tiedtke as Pomuchelskopp
- Erich Fiedler as Gottlieb
- Hans Brausewetter as Rudolf, Jungbauer
- Hildegard Barko as Linning, Zwillingsschwester
- Kristina Söderbaum as Minning, Zwillingsschwester
- Ursula Herking as Malchen
- Babsi Schultz-Reckewell as Margaret, seine Tochter
- Kurt Fischer-Fehling s Franz von Rambow
- Paul Westermeier as Rektor Baldrian
- Magdalena Schmidt as Seine Frau
- Albert Arid as Knecht
- Dorothea Thiess as Seine Frau
- Fritz Rasp as Slusohr, ein Gauner
- Lena Haustein as Salchen
- Julius E. Herrmann as Kaufmann Kurz
- William Huch as Kammerrat von Rambow
- Karl Junge-Swinburne as Amtmann
- Robert Leffler as Sadenwasser
- Klaus Pohl as Nachtwächter
- Gustav Rickelt as Der Lehrer
- Manny Ziener as Frau Nüssler

== See also ==
- During My Apprenticeship (1919)

== Bibliography ==
- Ascheid, Antje (2003). Hitler's Heroines: Stardom and Womanhood in Nazi Cinema. Philadelphia: Temple University Press. ISBN 978-1-56639-984-5.
- Klaus, Ulrich J. Deutsche Tonfilme: Jahrgang 1936. Klaus-Archiv, 1988.
- Kreimeier, Klaus (1999). The Ufa Story: A History of Germany's Greatest Film Company, 1918–1945. Berkeley: University of California Press. ISBN 978-0-520-22069-0.
