= Fritz Reuter =

Low German writer (1810–1874)

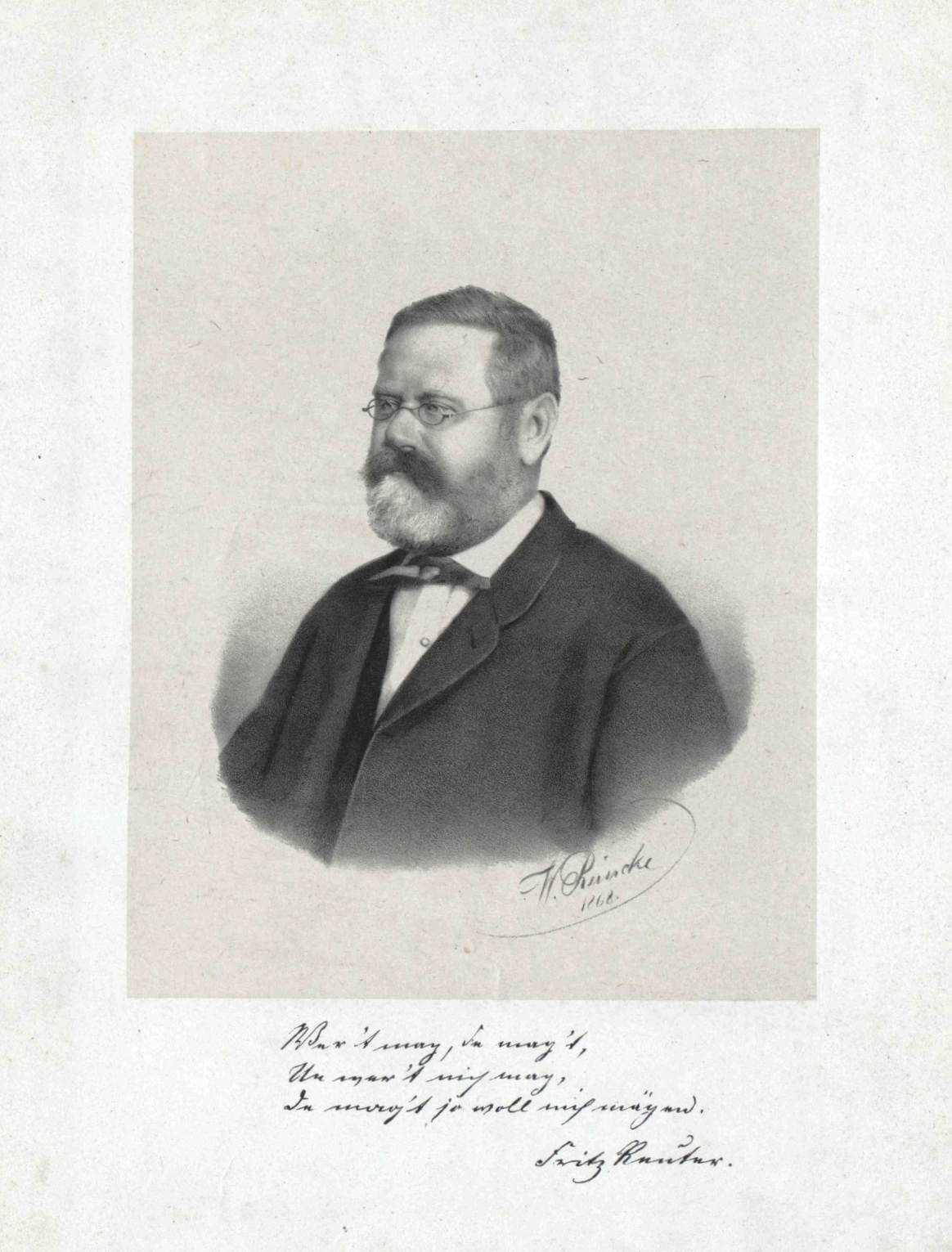
Fritz Reuter

Fritz Reuter (7 November 1810 – 12 July 1874; born as Heinrich Ludwig Christian Friedrich Reuter) was a novelist from Northern Germany who was a prominent contributor to Low German literature.

== Early life ==
Fritz Reuter was born at Stavenhagen in the Duchy of Mecklenburg-Schwerin, a small country town where his father was mayor and sheriff (Stadtrichter) and, in addition to his official duties, carried on the work of a farmer. He was educated at home by private tutors and subsequently at Gymnasien in Mecklenburg-Strelitz and in Parchim.

== Education and student fraternities ==
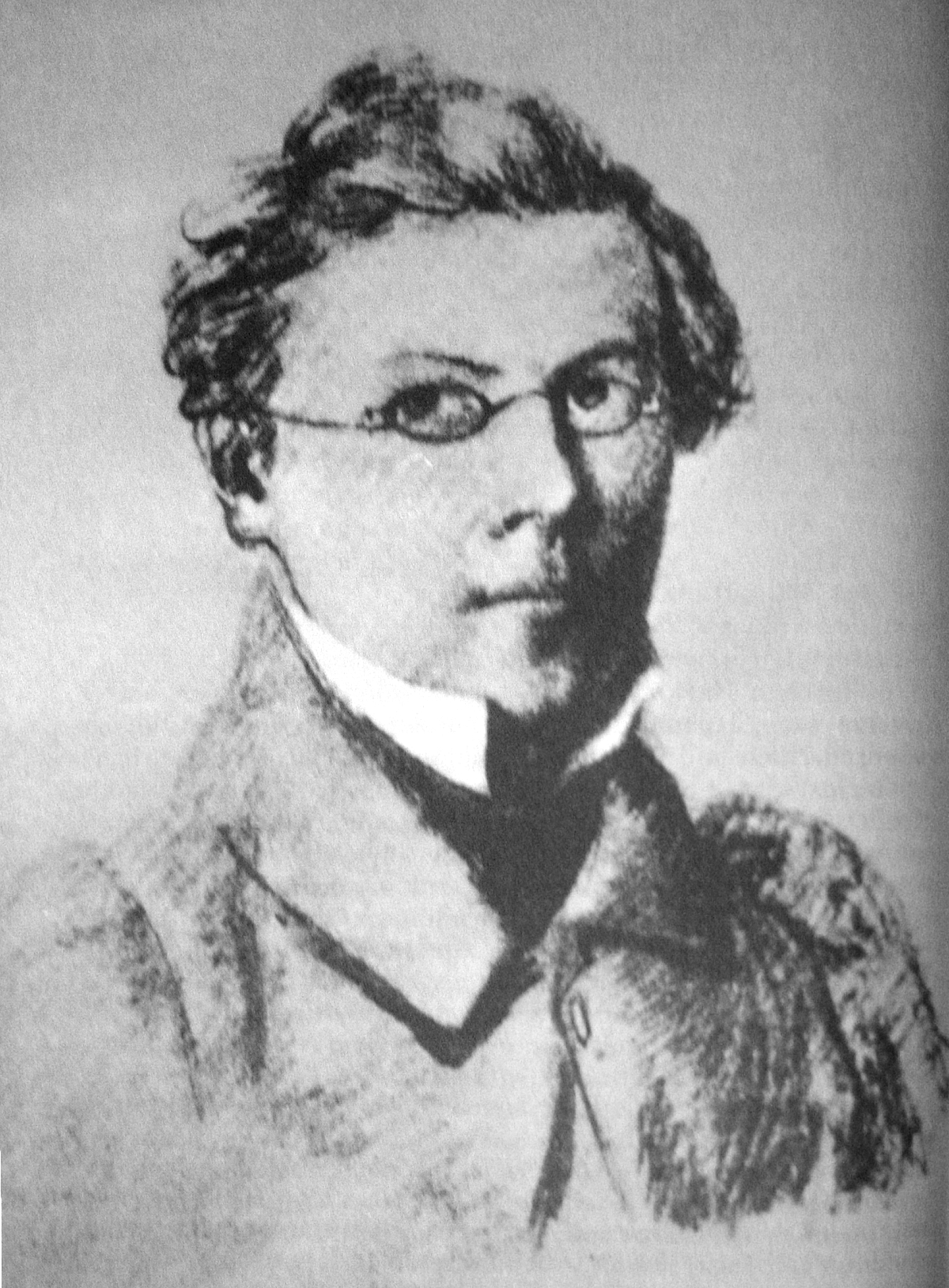
Fritz Reuter, 1833 self-portrait

On 19 October 1831, Reuter began studying jurisprudence according to his father's wishes in Rostock. There he joined the Corps Vandalia Rostock, who expelled him again a short time later because of "rough behaviour" and "burschenschaft activities". In the winter term of 1831/32 he joined the Rostock Burschenschaft, a student fraternity. Throughout his life, Reuter was friends with Moritz Wiggers and had a heartfelt dislike for John Brinckman, both of whom had also been active at Vandalia as students. From May 1832 he continued his studies in Jena. There he became a member of the Allgemeine Burschenschaft on 13 July 1832 and joined its radical movement "Germania", which is why he was arrested for the first time that same year. On 19 February, Reuter left Jena and went initially to Camburg. He tried to get a study permit for Halle or Leipzig, but was unsuccessful.

== Early career and imprisonment ==
In 1831, Reuter began to attend lectures on jurisprudence at the University of Rostock, and in the following year went to the University of Jena. Here he was a member of the political students' club Burschenschaft "Germania," and in 1833 was arrested in Berlin by the Prussian government and interned at Fort Silberberg in Silesia. Although the only charge which could be proved against him was that he had been seen wearing the club's colours, he was condemned to death for high treason. This sentence was commuted by King Frederick William III of Prussia to imprisonment (Festungshaft) for thirty years in a Prussian fortress, Feste Coburg. In 1838, through the personal intervention of the Grand Duke of Mecklenburg, he was delivered over to the authorities of his native state, and he spent the next two years in the fortress of Dömitz, but was set free in 1840, when an amnesty was proclaimed after the accession of Frederick William IV to the Prussian throne.

Although Reuter was now thirty years of age, he went to Heidelberg to resume his legal studies, but was forced by his father to give them up when it was found that he paid little attention to his studies. After returning to Mecklenburg, he spent some time with his uncle, a minister at Jabel, and then began working on an estate, in 1842, as Strom (trainee). Finding out, upon his father's death in 1845, that he had been disinherited, he realized that acquiring an estate of his own was out of the question, and he began to write, first in High German, later, with more success, in Low German. In 1850 he settled as a private tutor in the little town of Treptow an der Tollense in Pomerania (today Altentreptow, Mecklenburg-Vorpommern), and was now able to marry Luise Kuntze, the daughter of a Mecklenburg pastor.

== Early works ==
For a bibliography of Reuter's works see de:Fritz Reuter#Werke.

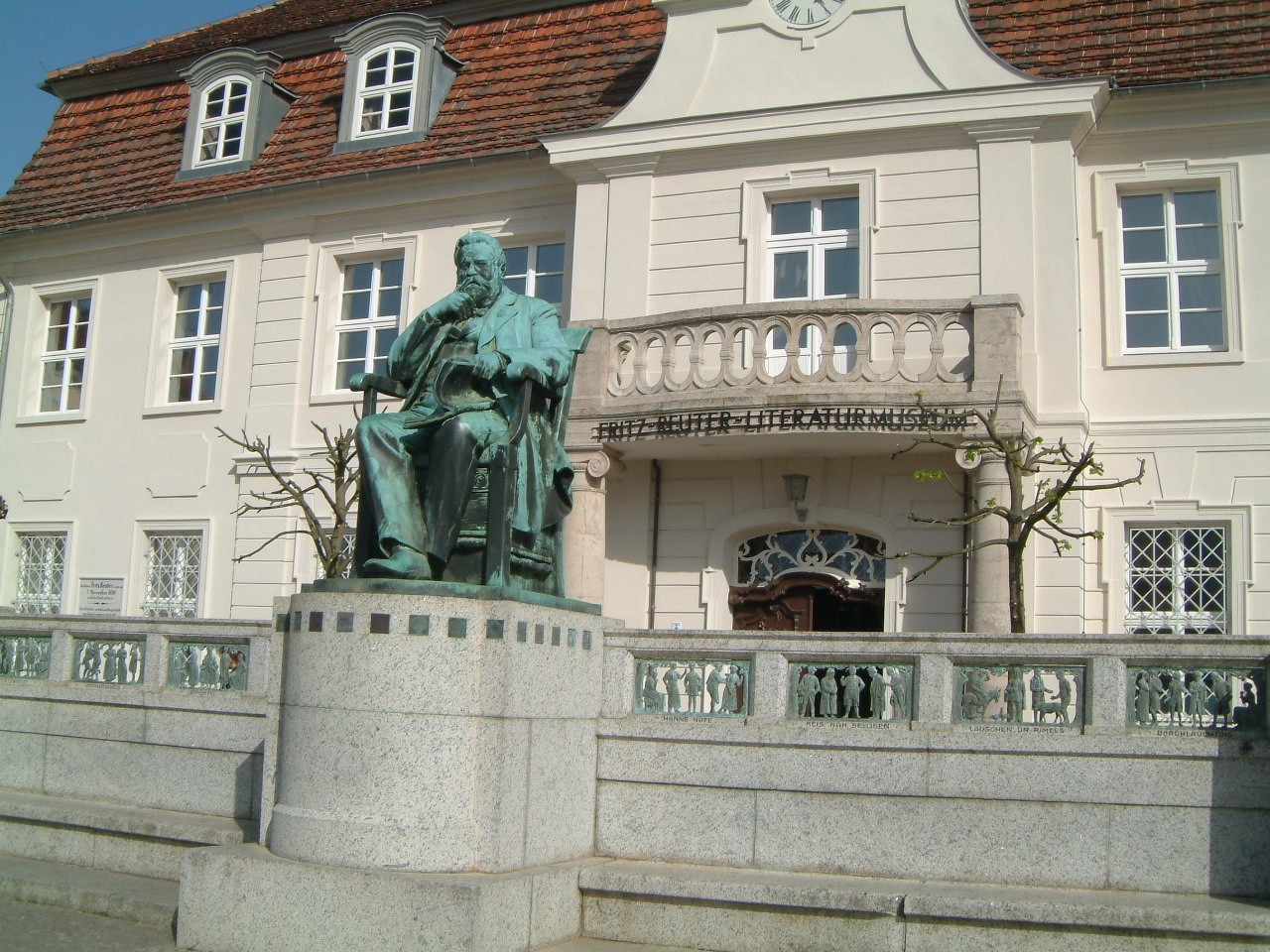
The Fritz-Reuter-Literaturmuseum in Stavenhagen.

Reuter's first publication was a collection of miscellaneous poems, written in Low German, entitled Läuschen un Riemels ("anecdotes and rhymes," 1853; a second collection followed in 1858). The book, which was received with encouraging favour, was followed by Polterabendgedichte (1855), and De Reis' nach Belligen (1855), the latter a humorous epic poem describing the adventures of some Mecklenburg peasants who resolve to go to Belgium (which they never reach) to learn the secrets of modern farming.

In 1856 Reuter left Treptow and established himself at Neubrandenburg, resolving to devote his whole time to literary work. His next book (published in 1858) was Kein Hüsung, a verse epic in which he presents with great force and vividness some of the least attractive aspects of village life in Mecklenburg. This was followed, in 1860, by Hanne Nüte un de lütte Pudel, the last of the works written by Reuter in verse.

In 1861 Reuter's popularity was largely increased by Schurr-Murr, a collection of tales, some of which are in standard German, but this work is of slight importance in comparison with the series of stories, entitled Olle Kamellen ("old stories of bygone days"). The first volume, published in 1860, contained Woans ick tau 'ne Fru kam and Ut de Franzosentid. Ut mine Festungstid (1861) formed the second volume; Ut mine Stromtid (1864) the third, fourth and fifth volumes; and Dörchläuchting (1866) the sixth volume – all written in the Plattdeutsch dialect of the author's home. Woans ick tau 'ne Fru kamm is a bright little tale, in which Reuter tells, in a half serious half bantering tone, how he wooed the lady who became his wife.

In Ut de Franzosentid the scene is laid in and near Stavenhagen in the year 1813, and the characters of the story are associated with the great events of the Napoleonic wars which then stirred the heart of Germany to its depths. Ut mine Festungstid, a narrative of Reuter's hardships during the term of his imprisonment, is no less vigorous either in conception or in style. Both novels have been translated into English by Carl F. Bayerschmidt, Ut mine Festungstid as Seven Years of My Life in 1975, and Ut de Franzosentid as When the French Were Here in 1984.

== Later works ==
For a bibliography of Reuter's works see de:Fritz Reuter#Werke.

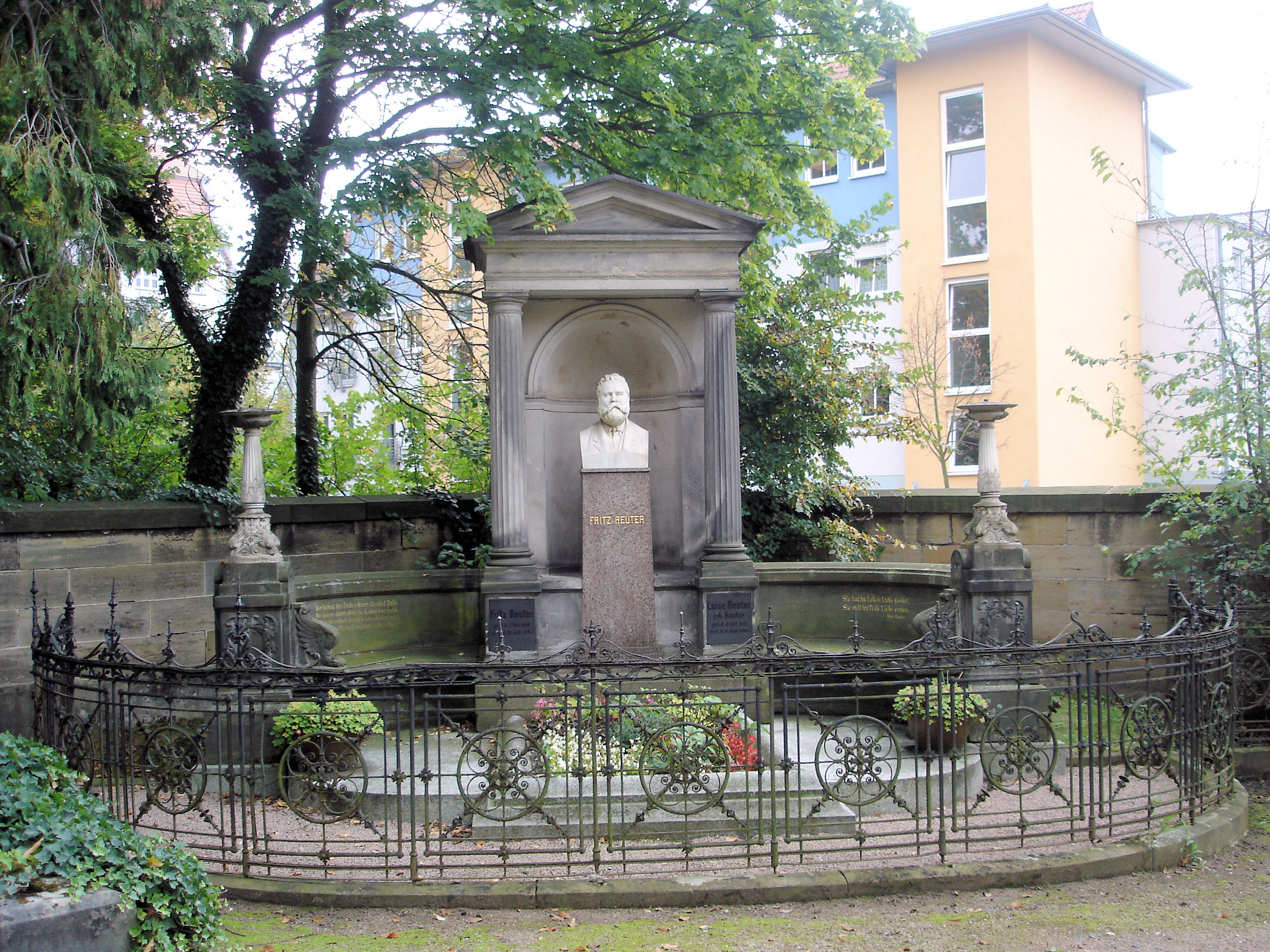
Fritz Reuter's gravesite in Eisenach.

The novel From My Farming Days (Ut mine Stromtid, 3 volumes) is by far the greatest of Reuter's writings. The men and women he describes are the men and women he knew in the villages and farmhouses of Mecklenburg, and the circumstances in which he places them are the circumstances by which they were surrounded in actual life. Ut mine Stromtid also presents some local aspects of the revolutionary movement of 1848.

M. W. MacDowell translated this book from German into English as From My Farming Days in 1878. A better translation is that by Katharine Tyler, which predated MacDowell's. It appeared in 1871 in Littell's Living Age and in 1872 in book form, titled Seed-Time and Harvest.

In 1863 Reuter transferred his residence from Neubrandenburg to Eisenach, after having received an honorary doctorate from Rostock University, and here he died on 12 July 1874.

== Reception ==
Reuter's stories are lacking in plot, but are marked by clever episodes, skillful character drawing and a humor, which, despite the difficulty of his medium, was universally appreciated in Germany. His Sämtliche Werke (collected works), in 13 volumes, were first published in 1863-1868. To these were added in 1875 two volumes of Nachgelassene Schriften, with a biography by Adolf von Wilbrandt, and in 1878 two supplementary volumes to the works appeared. A popular edition in 7 vols was published in 1877-1878 (last edition, 1902); there are also editions by Karl Friedrich Müller (18 vols, 1905), and Wilhelm Seelmann (7 vols, 1905-1906). Interest in Reuter was revived in the period after World War II, in part through the efforts of Friedrich Griese.

Among the institutions concerning themselves with the works of Reuter are the Fritz Reuter Gesellschaft e.V. in Neubrandenburg, the Fritz-Reuter-Literaturmuseum in Stavenhagen, the Reuter-Wagner-Museum in Eisenach, and the Fritz Reuter Literary Archive (Fritz Reuter Literaturarchiv) Hans-Joachim Griephan in Berlin. The latter archive keeps an index of the letters from and to Fritz Reuter.

The manuscript for one of Reuter's most important works, Kein Hüsung, was gifted in 1875 by his widow to the Plattdütsche Volksfestvereen von New York un New Jersey (Low German Festival Association of New York and New Jersey) which at first enclosed it beneath the monument in Schuetzen Park but recovered it in 1892. The association later erected a retirement home on the grounds where the manuscript was rediscovered in the 1970s by the American scholar Heinz C. Christiansen, following hints by Stavenhagen museum director Arnold Hückstädt, and was bound into a book. A scholar from Germany could access the manuscript in 2016. Its current whereabouts are unknown, after the retirement home was closed in 2017.

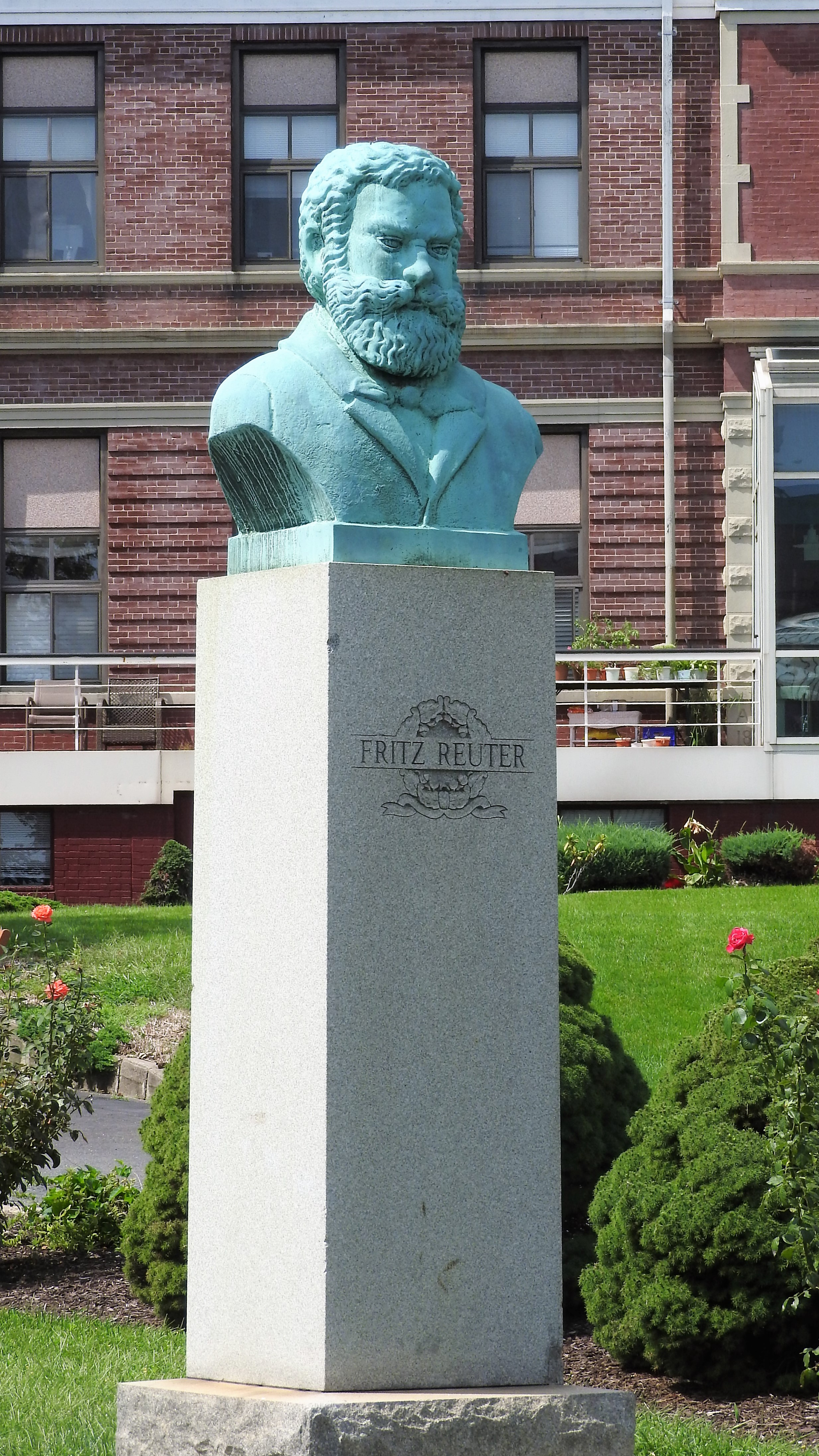
Bust of Reuter at the Fritz Reuter Altenheim at Schuetzen Park in North Bergen, New Jersey

== Filmography ==
- During My Apprenticeship (1919)
- Struggle for the Soil (1925)
- Uncle Bräsig (1936)
- Kein Hüsung (1954)

== See also ==
- Gorch Fock (author)
- Klaus Groth

== Bibliography ==
For a bibliography of Reuter's works see de:Fritz Reuter#Werke.

- Otto Glagau: Fritz Reuter und seine Dichtungen. Berlin: Lemke, 1866 (2nd ed. Berlin: Grote,1875)
- Hermann Ebert: Fritz Reuter: sein Leben und seine Werke Güstrow: Opitz, 1874
- Friedrich Latendorf: Zur Erinnerung an Fritz Reuter: verschollene Gedichte Reuters nebst volkstümlichen und wissenschaftlichen Reuter-Studien. Poesneck: Latendorf, 1879
- Karl Theodor Gaedertz: Fritz Reuter-Studien. Wismar: Hinstorff, 1890
- Karl Theodor Gaedertz: Aus Reuters jungen und alten Tagen : Neues über des Dichters Leben und Werke. 3 Bde. Wismar: Hinstorff, 1894-1900
- Briefe von Fritz Reuter an seinen Vater aus der Schüler-, Studenten-, und Festungszeit (1827 bis 1841) hrsg. von Franz Engel. 2 Bde. Braunschweig: Westermann, 1896
- Abraham Römer: Fritz Reuter in seinem Leben und Schaffen. Berlin: Mayer & Müller, 1896
- Gustav Raatz, Wahrheit und Dichtung in Fritz Reuter's Werken: Urbilder bekannter Reuter-Gestalten. Wismar: Hinstorff, 1895
- Ernst Brandes: Aus Fritz Reuters Leben. 2 Tle. Strasburg i. Westpr.: Fuhrich, 1899-1901 (Wissenschaftliche Beilage zu den Schulnachrichten des Gymansiums Strasburg i. Westpr. 1899, 1901)
- Karl Friedrich Müller: Der Mecklenburger Volksmund in Fritz Reuters Schriften: Sammlung und Erklärung volksthümlicher Wendungen und sprichwörtlicher Redensarten im Mecklenburgischen Platt. Leipzig: Hesse, 1901
