= Albrecht Tischbein =

German engineer and shipbuilder

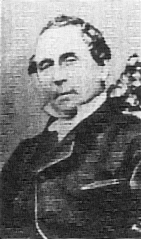
- Born: November 15, 1803; Sternberg, Duchy of Mecklenburg-Schwerin
- Died: March 22, 1881 (aged 77); Rostock
- Occupations: Engineer, Shipbuilder

Johann Heinrich Albrecht Tischbein (15 November 1803 in Sternberg – 22 March 1881 in Rostock) was a German engineer and shipbuilder; one of the designers of the first German iron screw steamers.

== Biography ==
His father was the painter and art teacher, August Albrecht Christian Tischbein. His youth was spent in the port of Rostock, where he developed his interest in ships. With help from his cousin, the naval officer and engineer Gerhard Moritz Roentgen, he was able to train as an engineer in Seraing with John Cockerill. In 1821, he completed his course and worked in Rotterdam as a mechanical engineer, building steamships. In 1837, he constructed a wooden steamship for the Elb-Dampfschiff-Fahrts-Compagnie in Magdeburg. From 1838 to 1849, he was the company's Technical Director. Under his leadership, the company produced 33 ships; 14 of iron.

1850 saw the creation of the "Rostocker Dampfschiff-Fahrt-Gesellschaft", with the goal of creating two iron steamships to provide regular service between Rostock and Saint Petersburg. After studying the situation there, Tischbein returned to Rostock and, together with the master shipbuilder Wilhelm Zeltz (1814-1864), established a shipyard and machine works. Their first iron ship, the "Grand Duke Friedrich Franz", was completed in 1851. It had 60 hp and could reach a speed of 9.25 knots. After only four years of service on the route, it was sold for financial reasons. Their second iron ship, the "Grand Duke Constantine", was completed in 1852. After that, Zeltz left to build wooden sailing ships. Tischbein remained as the Director until 1876. After several mergers and a buyout, his company became part of the "Actien-Gesellschaft Neptun" in 1890. The firm is still in business under the name Neptun Werft GmbH.

In addition to his ships, he also designed gas processing plants and steam pumps.
