= Mecklenburg-Strelitz (district) =

Coordinates: 53°25′N 13°15′E

- District
- Coat of arms

- Country: Germany
- State: Mecklenburg-Vorpommern
- Disbanded: 2011
- Capital: Neustrelitz

Area
  - Total: 2,089 km^{2} (807 sq mi)

Population (2010)
  - Total: 77,509
  - Density: 37.10/km^{2} (96.10/sq mi)
- Time zone: UTC+01:00 (CET)
  - Summer (DST): UTC+02:00 (CEST)
- Vehicle registration: MST
- Website: mecklenburg-strelitz.de

Mecklenburg-Strelitz was a Kreis (district) in the southern part of Mecklenburg-Western Pomerania, Germany. Neighboring districts were (from the north clockwise) Demmin, Ostvorpommern Uecker-Randow, the districts Uckermark, Oberhavel and Ostprignitz-Ruppin in Brandenburg, and the district Müritz. The district-free city Neubrandenburg was nearly surrounded by the district.

== History ==
The name of this district traces back to the Duchy of Mecklenburg-Strelitz. This duchy was established in 1701 after the former duchy of Mecklenburg-Güstrow ceased to exist. The area of the district is roughly identical with the old duchy's main territory, the Stargarder Land. The old duchy included an exclave around Ratzeburg, which is today situated in Schleswig-Holstein. Southern parts of the older Mecklenburg-Strelitz, including the town of Fürstenberg, today belong to Brandenburg's Oberhavel district. The capital of the duchy was the town of Strelitz, which was completely destroyed in a fire in 1712. After this disaster the duke ordered a new town built at the shore of a small lake called the Zierker See. This town became Neustrelitz (= "New Strelitz").

Mecklenburg-Strelitz District was established by merging the three previous districts of Neubrandenburg, Neustrelitz and Strasburg in 1994. On 4 September 2011, it was merged into Mecklenburgische Seenplatte.

== Coat of arms ==
The bull head on a yellow field is the coat of arms of the dukes of Mecklenburg. The tower stands for the castle of Stargard, the longtime seat of the dukes of Mecklenburg since its construction in the 13th century; it remains the northernmost mountain-top castle in present-day Germany. The Maltese cross alludes to the possessions of the Order of St. John of Malta in the territory before 1648.

As opposed to most other 1994-2011 districts in Mecklenburg-Vorpommern, Mecklenburg-Strelitz never had an official flag.

== Towns and municipalities ==
The subdivisions of the district were (situation August 2011):

Amt-free towns
1. Neustrelitz
Amt-free municipalities
1. Feldberger Seenlandschaft

Ämter
1. Friedland; 1. Datzetal; 2. Eichhorst^{3}; 3. Friedland^{1, 2}; 4. Galenbeck; 5. Genzkow; 6. Glienke^{3}; 2. Mecklenburgische Kleinseenplatte; 1. Mirow^{1, 2}; 2. Priepert; 3. Roggentin; 4. Wesenberg^{2}; 5. Wustrow	3. Neustrelitz-Land (seat: Neustrelitz); 1. Blankensee; 2. Blumenholz; 3. Carpin; 4. Godendorf; 5. Grünow; 6. Hohenzieritz; 7. Klein Vielen; 8. Kratzeburg; 9. Möllenbeck; 10. Userin; 11. Wokuhl-Dabelow; 4. Neverin; 1. Beseritz; 2. Blankenhof; 3. Brunn; 4. Neddemin; 5. Neuenkirchen; 6. Neverin^{1}; 7. Sponholz; 8. Staven; 9. Trollenhagen; 10. Woggersin; 11. Wulkenzin; 12. Zirzow	5. Stargarder Land; 1. Burg Stargard^{1, 2}; 2. Cammin; 3. Cölpin; 4. Groß Nemerow; 5. Holldorf; 6. Lindetal; 7. Pragsdorf; 8. Teschendorf; 6. Woldegk; 1. Groß Miltzow; 2. Helpt^{3}; 3. Kublank; 4. Mildenitz^{3}; 5. Neetzka; 6. Petersdorf; 7. Schönbeck; 8. Schönhausen; 9. Voigtsdorf; 10. Woldegk^{1, 2}
^{1} - seat of the Amt; ^{2} - town; ^{3} - former town/municipality
