= Groß Miltzow =

- Municipality
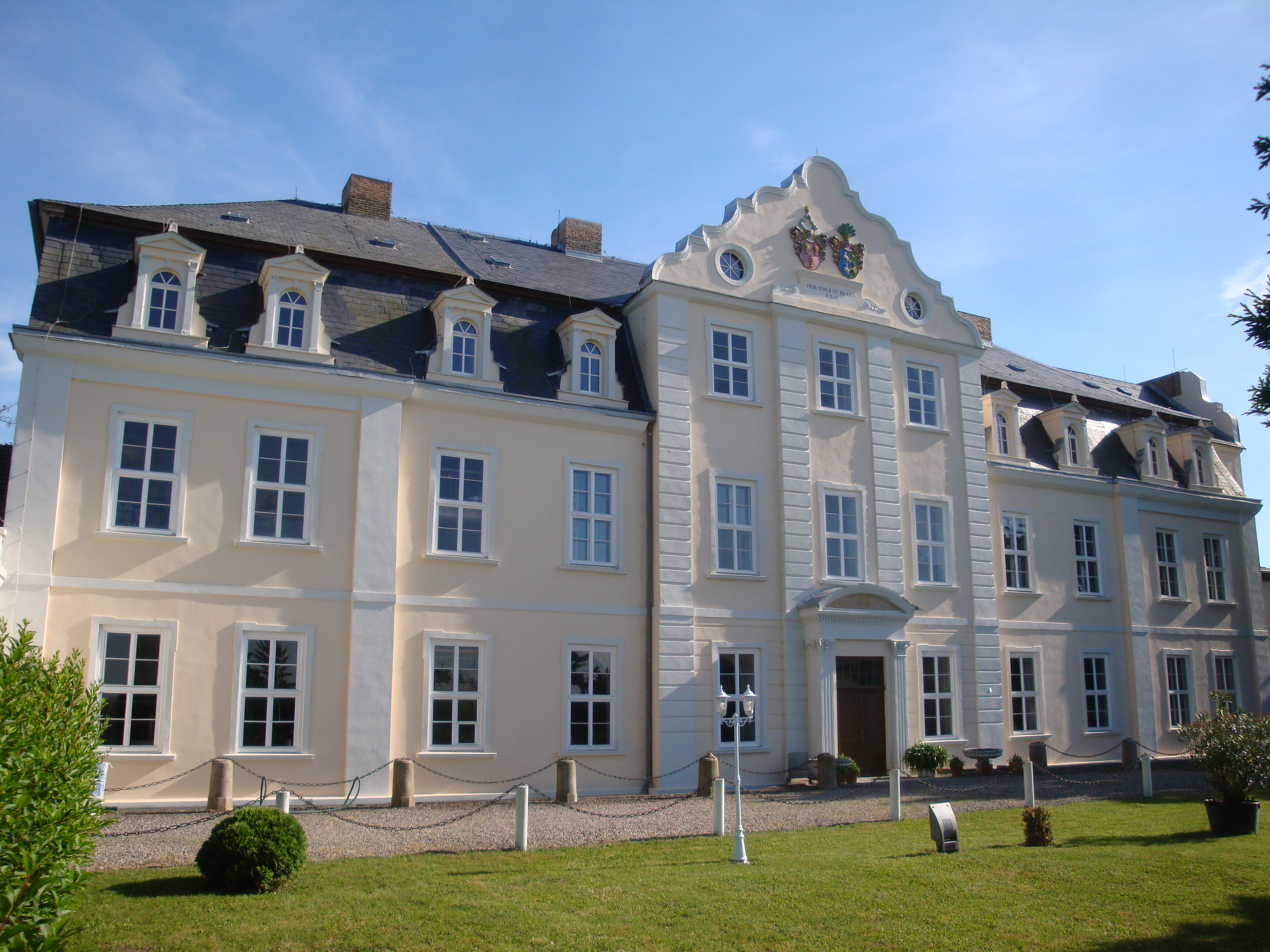
- Groß Miltzow Manor

- Location of Groß Miltzow within Mecklenburgische Seenplatte district
- Interactive map of Groß Miltzow
- Location within Germany Location within Mecklenburg-Vorpommern
- Coordinates: 53°32′N 13°36′E
- Country: Germany
- State: Mecklenburg-Vorpommern
- District: Mecklenburgische Seenplatte
- Municipal assoc.: Woldegk

Government
  - Mayor: Wolfgang Kiefel

Area
  - Total: 48.54 km^{2} (18.74 sq mi)
- Elevation: 90 m (300 ft)

Population (2025-12-31)
  - Total: 956
  - Density: 19.7/km^{2} (51.0/sq mi)
- Time zone: UTC+01:00 (CET)
  - Summer (DST): UTC+02:00 (CEST)
- Postal codes: 17349
- Dialling codes: 03967, 03968, 039753
- Vehicle registration: MST

Groß Miltzow is a municipality in the district Mecklenburgische Seenplatte, in Mecklenburg-Vorpommern, Germany.

== Geography ==
Groß Miltzow is located about 20 kilometres east of Neubrandenburg and eleven kilometres north of Woldegk. Groß Miltzow is surrounded by the neighbouring municipalities of Schönbeck in the North, Voigtsdorf and Schönhausen in the North East, Strasburg (Uckermark) in the East, Woldegk in the South, Neetzka in the West and Kublank in the North West.

== Groß Miltzow F5 tornado ==
Groß Miltzow was struck with the only F5 tornado according to the Fujita scale in Germany's history. This event occurred on 29 June 1764. The tornado in question tracked 33 km and grew to 800m wide at its largest, according to the Tornado Archive and the European Severe Storms Laboratory
