= Mecklenburg-Strelitz =

Mecklenburg-Strelitz may refer to:

- Duchy of Mecklenburg-Strelitz (1701–1815), a duchy of the Holy Roman Empire and the Confederation of the Rhine
- Grand Duchy of Mecklenburg-Strelitz (1815–1918), a Grand Duchy of the German Confederation and the North German Confederation, that later became part of the German Empire
- Free State of Mecklenburg-Strelitz (1918–1933), part of the Weimar Republic and Nazi Germany
- Mecklenburg-Strelitz (district) (1994–2011), a district in the southern part of Mecklenburg-Western Pomerania
