= Sophie Behr =

German science fiction writer

- Born: January 7, 1935 Neubrandenburg
- Died: February 21, 2015 (aged 80)
- Occupation: writer, journalist
- Subject: Science fiction
- Notable works: Ida & Laura. Once more with feeling

Sophie Behr née Sophie Elisabeth von Behr-Negendanck; January 7, 1935, in Neubrandenburg – February 21, 2015) was a German feminist journalist and author of practical life books and novels that combine motherhood and feminist science fiction.

== Biography ==
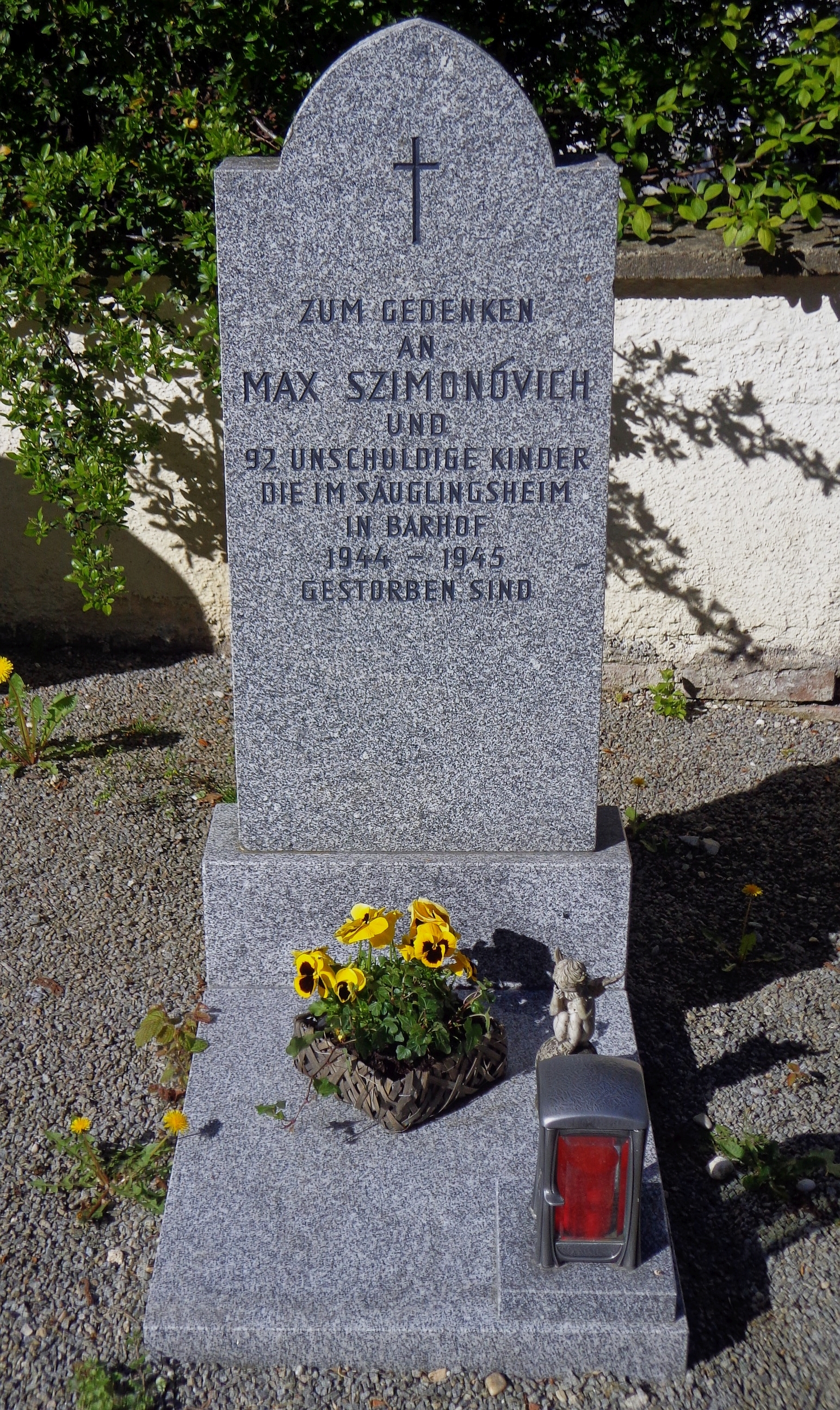
Friedhof Hader (Ruhstorf an der Rott) Kinder von Barhof memorial.

Sophie Behr was the daughter of Gertrude née von Rumohr (1908-1994) and Hans Jasper von Behr-Negendanck (1901-1944), a Mecklenburg landowner and retired reserve lieutenant. She grew up in her father's manor house in Neverin, near Neubrandenburg. Her family was expropriated in 1945 and fled to Schleswig-Holstein. After graduating from the Ostsee-Gymnasium Timmendorfer Strand, she studied English, Spanish, psychology and sociology.

She was a journalist for Der Spiegel for 16 years and chief correspondent for Munich and then Berlin, before working as a freelance journalist for Emma, radio and the feminist press[.

Behr was also co-founder of the Association of Single Mothers and Fathers (originally called the Association of Single Mothers (Verbandes alleinerziehender Mütter und Väter)), of which she was president from 1977 to 1981[1]. From 1984 until her death, she lived in Ruhstorf an der Rott in Lower Bavaria, at the Barhof near Hader, which she also transformed into a memorial to the 90 children of forced labourers murdered there in 1944-1945.

Björn Engholm included him in his government team for the 1983 regional elections in Schleswig-Holstein.

In 1997 she wrote Ida & Laura. Once more with feeling, a feminist science fiction novel.

== Works ==
- Behr, Sophie (1997). Ida & Laura: once more with feeling; Roman. Clelia (in German). Königstein/Taunus: Helmer. ISBN 978-3-927164-57-4.
- Riecher Innerunge (in German). Passau: Eigenverlag. 1991. ISBN 3-499-17373-5.
- Barhof. Ruhstorf: Eigenverlag. 2007. ISBN 978-3-940445-09-4.
- Reisen, speisen, grausam sein (in German). Koenigstein/Taunus: Helmer. 2007. ISBN 978-3-89741-232-3.
- Barhof (in German). Ruhstorf: self published. 2007. ISBN 978-3-940445-09-4.
- Inselgeschichten (in German). Ruhstor: self published. 2009. ISBN 978-3-940445-76-6.
