= Cammin =

Cammin may refer to:

- Cammin, Rostock, a municipality in the district of Rostock, Mecklenburg-Vorpommern, Germany
- Cammin (Burg Stargard), a village in the town of Burg Stargard, Mecklenburg-Vorpommern, Germany
- the German name for Kamień Pomorski, West Pomeranian Voivodeship, Poland
- the former Bishopric of Cammin
