= Galenbecker Tanzlinde =

Galenbeck Dance Linden
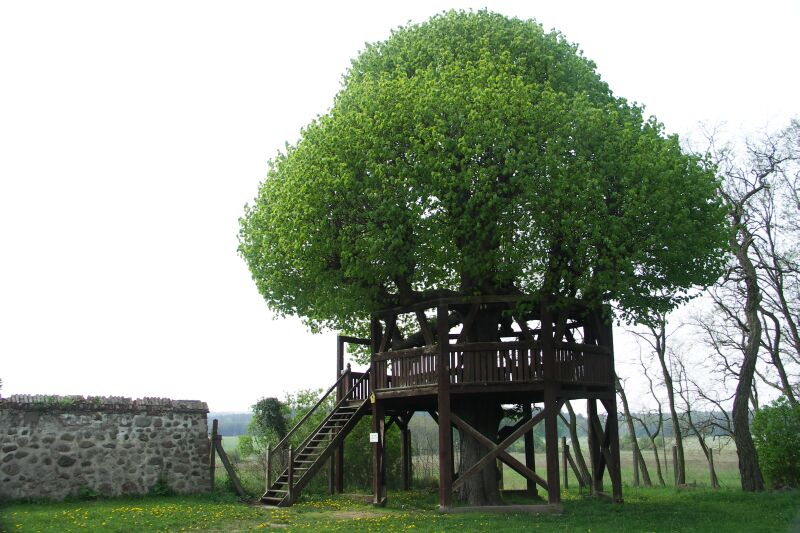
- The Galenbeck Dance Linden
- Interactive map of Galenbeck Dance Linden
- Species: Tilia × europaea (Tilia × europaea)
- Height: 14 m (46 ft)

The Galenbeck Dance Linden (German: Galenbecker Tanzlinde), also known as the Luisenlinde (Louise's Linden, named after Louise of Mecklenburg-Strelitz), is a dance linden tree located in Galenbeck, Mecklenburg Lake District, in the state of Mecklenburg-Vorpommern. It is the only dance linden in this state.

== Description ==
The tree is a common linden (Tilia × europaea) standing 14 meters tall. Planted in 1788, it was 234 years old as of 2022.

Originally, the tree had three levels.

The dance floor, located approximately three meters above the ground, now rests on an octagonal lattice structure rebuilt in 1993.

== Location and history ==
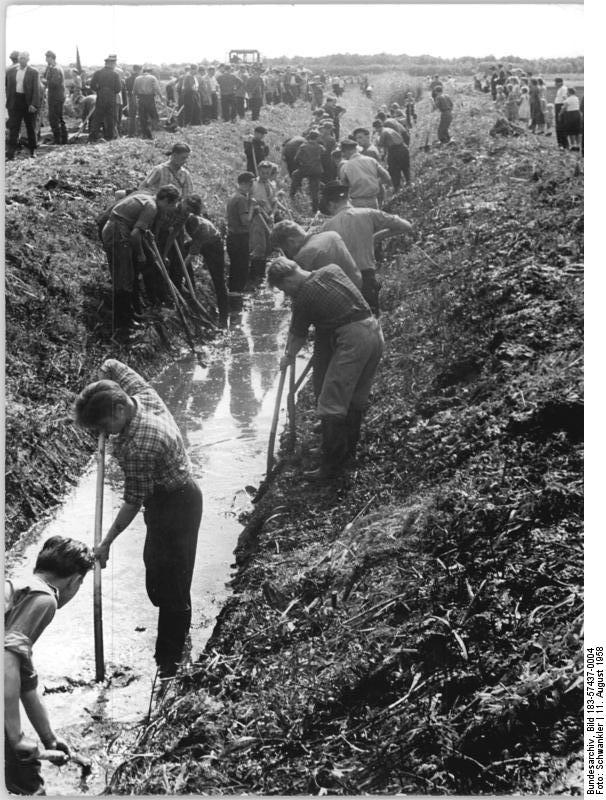
Members of the Free German Youth cleaning drainage ditches nearby in 1958.

The tree is located in the former park of the manor estate and was planted in 1788 in honor of Louise of Mecklenburg-Strelitz. Some sources suggest it was planted at the time of her death, but she died in 1810.

It is situated near the oaks of Rattey Castle.

Local stories explain that the linden was equipped with a dance platform because the lords liked to have tea or coffee in the tree on nice days, enjoying a magnificent view of the landscape. To offer something to the village's workers, the maids and servants could gather there after work.

On the estate, in addition to the remains of the von Rieben manor and a church, there is the old manor house of the Belling family - where Gebhard Leberecht von Blücher, later a Field Marshal in the Prussian Army, was imprisoned in 1760. Blücher played a decisive role in the victory over Napoleon.

Nearby, during the era of the GDR, the Large Meadow of Friedländer, adjacent to the Galenbecker See, was a massive project of the Free German Youth in the 1950s, with over 6,000 young people digging drainage ditches.

The tree was restored in 2022, but its status as a natural and historical monument complicates repairs.

== Usage ==
The village festival is held annually under the linden tree.
