= Woggersin =

- Municipality
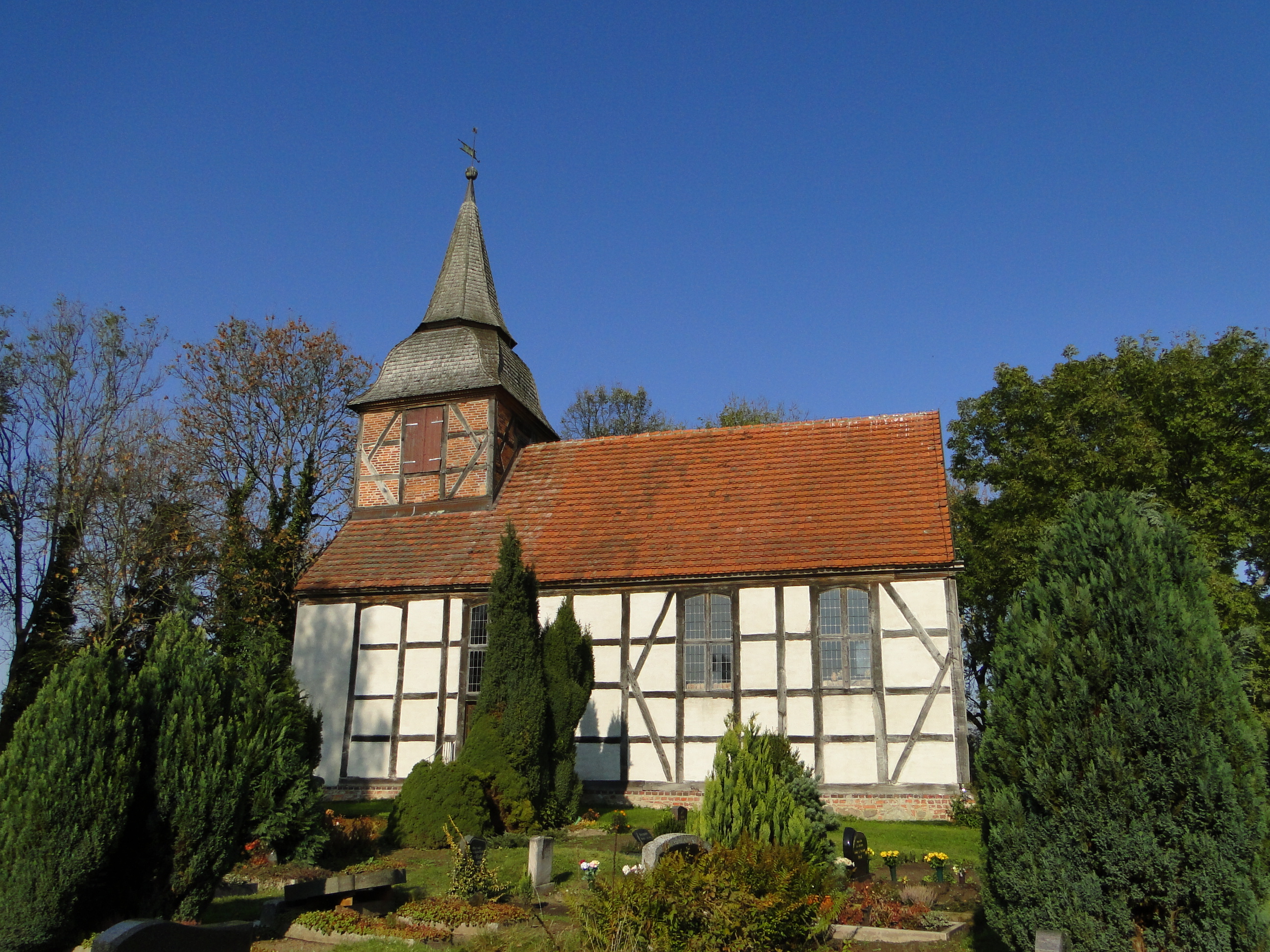
- Woggersin Church

- Coat of arms

- Location of Woggersin within Mecklenburgische Seenplatte district
- Interactive map of Woggersin
- Location within Germany Location within Mecklenburg-Vorpommern
- Coordinates: 53°35′N 13°13′E
- Country: Germany
- State: Mecklenburg-Vorpommern
- District: Mecklenburgische Seenplatte
- Municipal assoc.: Neverin

Government
  - Mayor: Manfred Peters

Area
  - Total: 6.44 km^{2} (2.49 sq mi)
- Elevation: 25 m (82 ft)

Population (2025-12-31)
  - Total: 509
  - Density: 79.0/km^{2} (205/sq mi)
- Time zone: UTC+01:00 (CET)
  - Summer (DST): UTC+02:00 (CEST)
- Postal codes: 17039
- Dialling codes: 0395
- Vehicle registration: MST
- Website: www.woggersin.de

Woggersin is a municipality in the district of Mecklenburgische Seenplatte, in Mecklenburg-Vorpommern, Germany.
