= Möllenbeck, Mecklenburg-Strelitz =

Möllenbeck
- Municipality
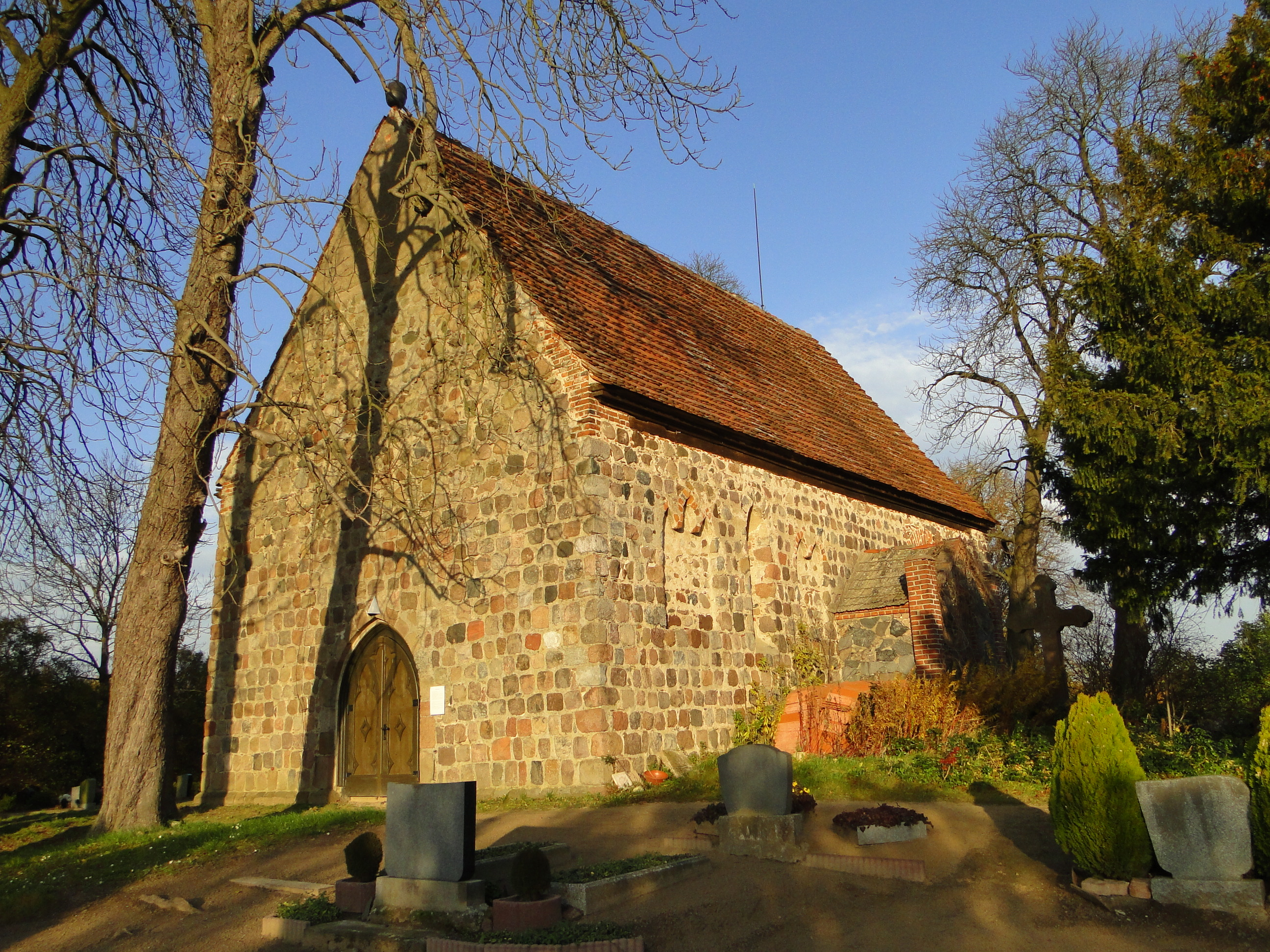
- Church in Möllenbeck

- Location of Möllenbeck within Mecklenburgische Seenplatte district
- Interactive map of Möllenbeck
- Location within Germany Location within Mecklenburg-Vorpommern
- Coordinates: 53°22′N 13°20′E
- Country: Germany
- State: Mecklenburg-Vorpommern
- District: Mecklenburgische Seenplatte
- Municipal assoc.: Neustrelitz-Land

Government
  - Mayor: Hubertus Hübner

Area
  - Total: 36.20 km^{2} (13.98 sq mi)
- Elevation: 90 m (300 ft)

Population (2025-12-31)
  - Total: 777
  - Density: 21.5/km^{2} (55.6/sq mi)
- Time zone: UTC+01:00 (CET)
  - Summer (DST): UTC+02:00 (CEST)
- Postal codes: 17237
- Dialling codes: 039826
- Vehicle registration: MST
- Website: www.amtneustrelitz-land.de

Möllenbeck is a municipality in the Mecklenburgische Seenplatte district, in Mecklenburg-Vorpommern, in north-eastern Germany.

== History ==
During the final stages of World War II, on 11–17 February 1945, Warbende (now part of the municipality) was the site of a stopover during the German-organised march of some 2,700 French prisoners of war from the Oflag II-B camp headed westwards.
