= Brunn, Mecklenburg-Vorpommern =

Brunn
- Municipality
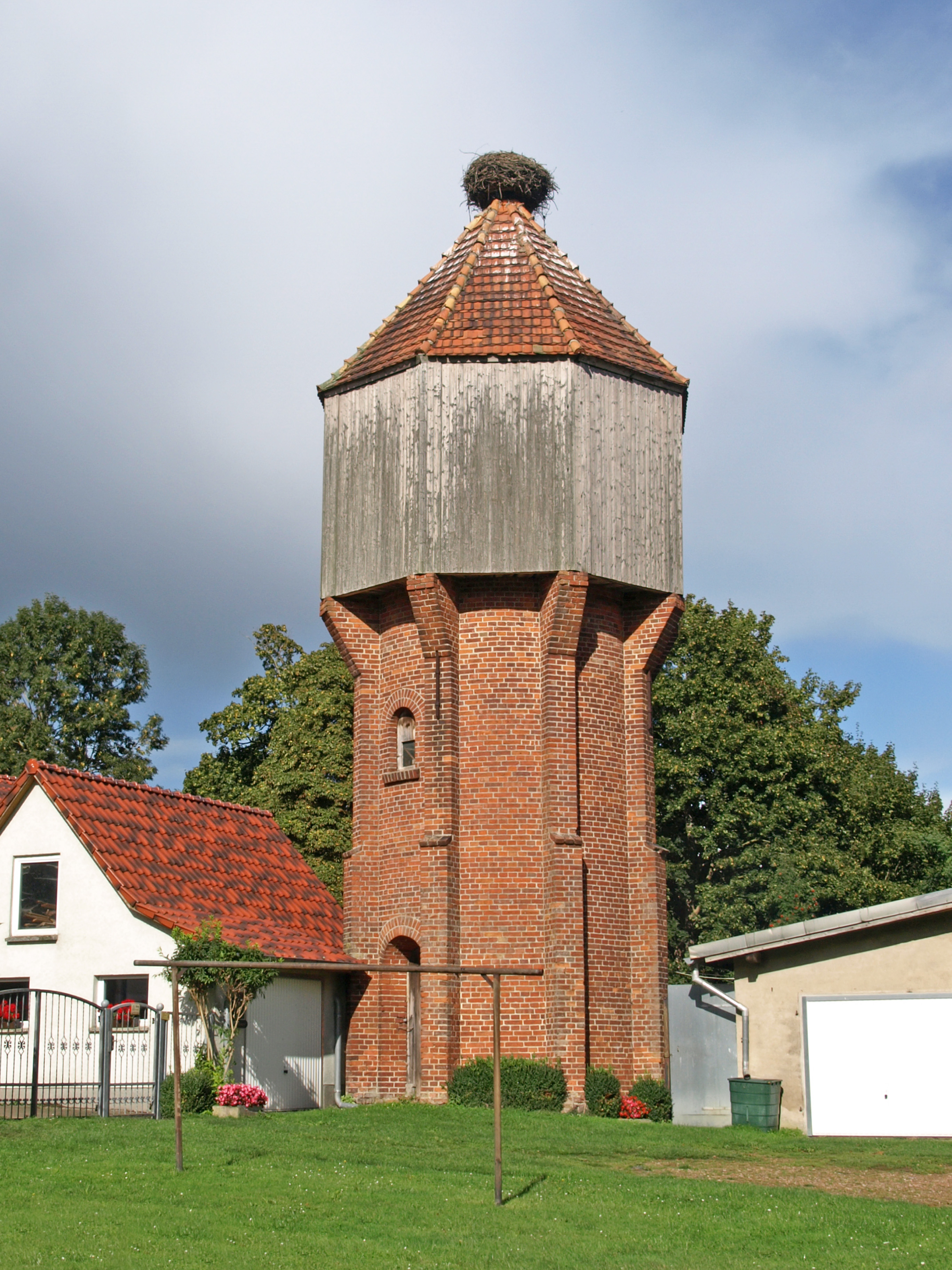
- Water tower

- Location of Brunn within Mecklenburgische Seenplatte district
- Interactive map of Brunn
- Location within Germany Location within Mecklenburg-Vorpommern
- Coordinates: 53°40′N 13°22′E
- Country: Germany
- State: Mecklenburg-Vorpommern
- District: Mecklenburgische Seenplatte
- Municipal assoc.: Neverin

Government
  - Mayor: Lutz Freund

Area
  - Total: 47.77 km^{2} (18.44 sq mi)
- Elevation: 30 m (98 ft)

Population (2025-12-31)
  - Total: 1,023
  - Density: 21.42/km^{2} (55.46/sq mi)
- Time zone: UTC+01:00 (CET)
  - Summer (DST): UTC+02:00 (CEST)
- Postal codes: 17039
- Dialling codes: 039601, 039608
- Vehicle registration: MST
- Website: www.amt-neverin.de

Brunn (German pronunciation: [bʁʊn]) is a municipality in the Mecklenburgische Seenplatte district, in Mecklenburg-Vorpommern, Germany.
