= Stargarder Land =

- Amt
- Map of Mecklenburgische Seenplatte highlighting Stargarder Land
- Interactive map of Stargarder Land
- Location within Germany Location within Mecklenburg-Vorpommern
- Coordinates: 53°29′N 13°24′E
- Country: Germany
- State: Mecklenburg-Vorpommern
- District: Mecklenburgische Seenplatte
- Seat: Burg Stargard
- Subdivisions: 6 municipalities

Area
  - Total: 205.19 km^{2} (79.22 sq mi)

Population (2025-12-31)
  - Total: 9,555
  - Density: 46.57/km^{2} (120.6/sq mi)
- Time zone: UTC+01:00 (CET)
  - Summer (DST): UTC+02:00 (CEST)
- Website: www.burg-stargard.de/amt-stargarder-land/

Stargarder Land is an Amt in the Mecklenburgische Seenplatte district, in Mecklenburg-Vorpommern, Germany. The seat of the Amt is in Burg Stargard.

== Subdivisions ==
The Amt Stargarder Land consists of the following municipalities:

1. Burg Stargard
2. Cölpin
3. Groß Nemerow
4. Holldorf
5. Lindetal
6. Pragsdorf

== See also ==
- Stargarder Land (wine region)
