= Cölpin =

- Municipality
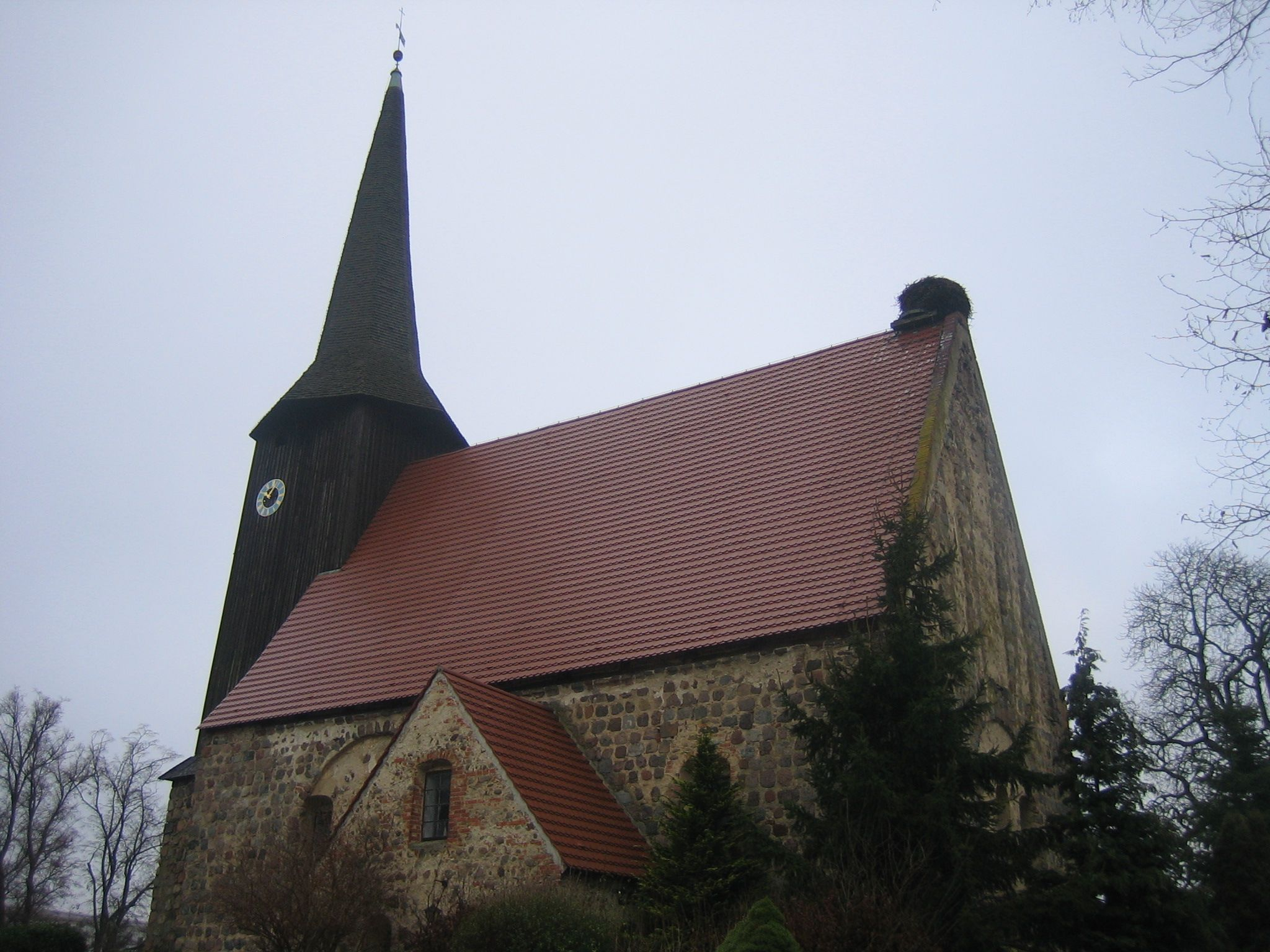
- Church in Cölpin

- Flag Coat of arms

- Location of Cölpin within Mecklenburgische Seenplatte district
- Interactive map of Cölpin
- Location within Germany Location within Mecklenburg-Vorpommern
- Coordinates: 53°30′N 13°25′E
- Country: Germany
- State: Mecklenburg-Vorpommern
- District: Mecklenburgische Seenplatte
- Municipal assoc.: Stargarder Land

Government
  - Mayor: Joachim Jünger

Area
  - Total: 21.22 km^{2} (8.19 sq mi)
- Elevation: 82 m (269 ft)

Population (2025-12-31)
  - Total: 874
  - Density: 41.2/km^{2} (107/sq mi)
- Time zone: UTC+01:00 (CET)
  - Summer (DST): UTC+02:00 (CEST)
- Postal codes: 17094
- Dialling codes: 03966
- Vehicle registration: MST
- Website: www.gemeinde-coelpin.de

Cölpin is a municipality in the Mecklenburgische Seenplatte district, in Mecklenburg-Vorpommern, Germany.
