= Groß Nemerow =

- Municipality
- Location of Groß Nemerow within Mecklenburgische Seenplatte district
- Interactive map of Groß Nemerow
- Location within Germany Location within Mecklenburg-Vorpommern
- Coordinates: 53°27′N 13°14′E
- Country: Germany
- State: Mecklenburg-Vorpommern
- District: Mecklenburgische Seenplatte
- Municipal assoc.: Stargarder Land

Government
  - Mayor: Wilfried Stegemann

Area
  - Total: 21.01 km^{2} (8.11 sq mi)
- Elevation: 75 m (246 ft)

Population (2025-12-31)
  - Total: 1,104
  - Density: 52.55/km^{2} (136.1/sq mi)
- Time zone: UTC+01:00 (CET)
  - Summer (DST): UTC+02:00 (CEST)
- Postal codes: 17094
- Dialling codes: 039605
- Vehicle registration: MST
- Website: www.burg-stargard.de

Groß Nemerow is a municipality in the district Mecklenburgische Seenplatte, in Mecklenburg-Vorpommern, Germany.
