= Neverin (Amt) =

- Amt
- Map of Mecklenburgische Seenplatte highlighting Neverin
- Interactive map of Neverin
- Location within Germany Location within Mecklenburg-Vorpommern
- Coordinates: 53°37′N 13°20′E
- Country: Germany
- State: Mecklenburg-Vorpommern
- District: Mecklenburgische Seenplatte
- Seat: Neverin
- Subdivisions: 12 municipalities

Area
  - Total: 222.81 km^{2} (86.03 sq mi)

Population (2025-12-31)
  - Total: 8,604
  - Density: 38.62/km^{2} (100.0/sq mi)
- Time zone: UTC+01:00 (CET)
  - Summer (DST): UTC+02:00 (CEST)
- Website: amtneverin.de

Neverin is an Amt in the Mecklenburgische Seenplatte district, in Mecklenburg-Vorpommern, Germany. The seat of the Amt is in Neverin.

The Amt Neverin consists of the following municipalities:

1. Beseritz
2. Blankenhof
3. Brunn
4. Neddemin
5. Neuenkirchen
6. Neverin
7. Sponholz
8. Staven
9. Trollenhagen
10. Woggersin
11. Wulkenzin
12. Zirzow
