= Eichhorst =

- Ortsteil of Friedland
- Interactive map of Eichhorst
- Location within Germany Location within Mecklenburg-Vorpommern
- Coordinates: 53°36′N 13°29′E
- Country: Germany
- State: Mecklenburg-Vorpommern
- District: Mecklenburgische Seenplatte
- Town: Friedland

Area
  - Total: 28.31 km^{2} (10.93 sq mi)
- Elevation: 62 m (203 ft)

Population (2012-12-31)
  - Total: 474
  - Density: 16.7/km^{2} (43.4/sq mi)
- Time zone: UTC+01:00 (CET)
  - Summer (DST): UTC+02:00 (CEST)
- Postal codes: 17099
- Dialling codes: 039606
- Vehicle registration: MST
- Website: www.friedland-mecklenburg.de

Eichhorst (German pronunciation: [ˈaɪçˌhɔʁst]) is a village and a former municipality in the Mecklenburgische Seenplatte district, in Mecklenburg-Vorpommern, Germany. It has formed part of the town of Friedland since 25 May 2014.

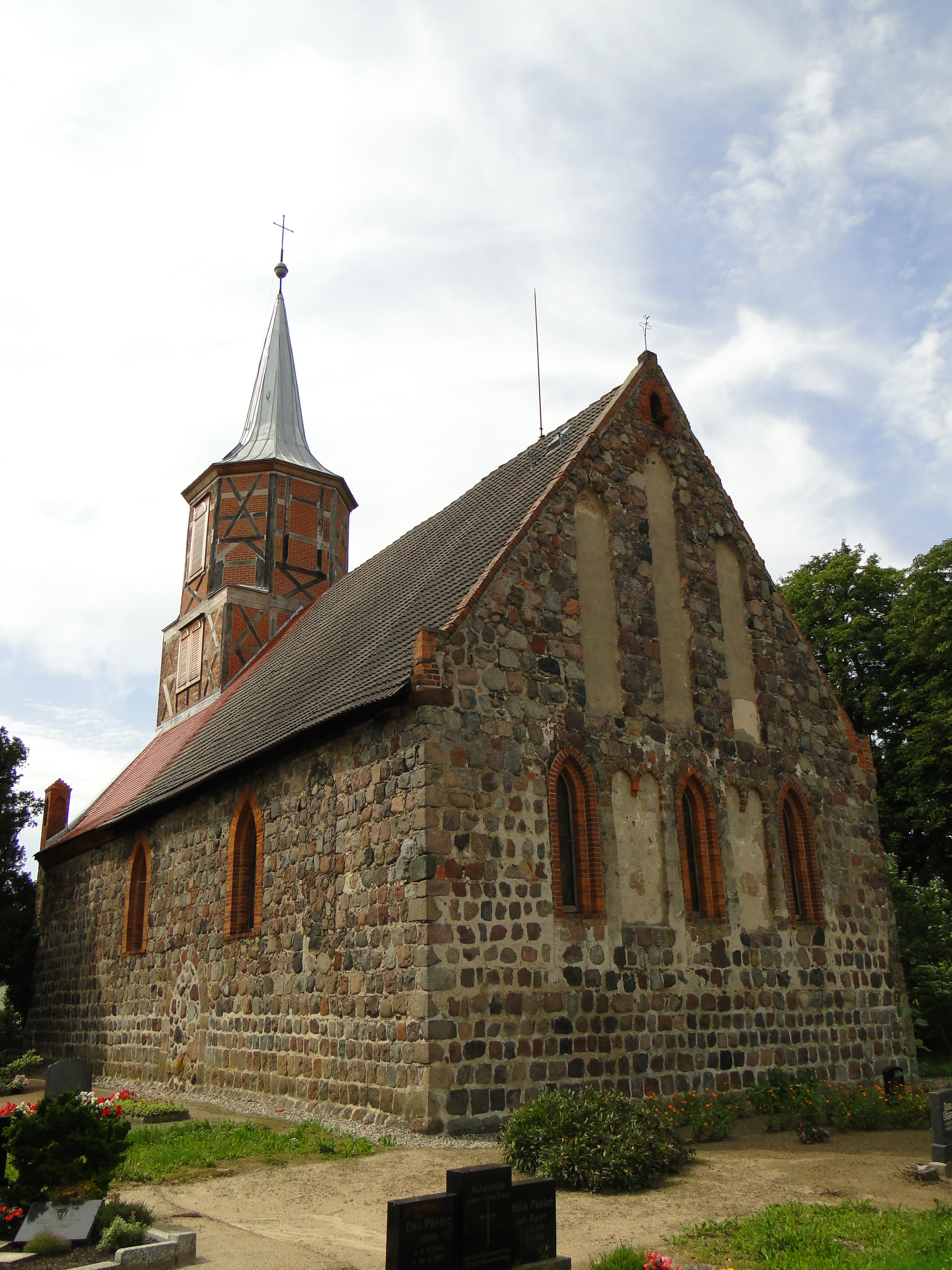
Church in Eichhorst.
