= Klein Vielen =

- Municipality
- Location of Klein Vielen within Mecklenburgische Seenplatte district
- Interactive map of Klein Vielen
- Location within Germany Location within Mecklenburg-Vorpommern
- Coordinates: 53°26′N 13°01′E
- Country: Germany
- State: Mecklenburg-Vorpommern
- District: Mecklenburgische Seenplatte
- Municipal assoc.: Neustrelitz-Land

Government
  - Mayor: Klaus-Jürgen Schäfer

Area
  - Total: 45.38 km^{2} (17.52 sq mi)
- Elevation: 100 m (330 ft)

Population (2025-12-31)
  - Total: 656
  - Density: 14.5/km^{2} (37.4/sq mi)
- Time zone: UTC+01:00 (CET)
  - Summer (DST): UTC+02:00 (CEST)
- Postal codes: 17237
- Dialling codes: 03981, 039822, 039824
- Vehicle registration: MST
- Website: www.amtneustrelitz-land.de

Klein Vielen (Small Thanks) is a municipality in the district Mecklenburgische Seenplatte, in Mecklenburg-Vorpommern, Germany.
