= Wokuhl-Dabelow =

- Municipality
- Location of Wokuhl-Dabelow within Mecklenburgische Seenplatte district
- Interactive map of Wokuhl-Dabelow
- Location within Germany Location within Mecklenburg-Vorpommern
- Coordinates: 53°16′N 13°12′E
- Country: Germany
- State: Mecklenburg-Vorpommern
- District: Mecklenburgische Seenplatte
- Municipal assoc.: Neustrelitz-Land

Government
  - Mayor: Manfred Marczok

Area
  - Total: 46.15 km^{2} (17.82 sq mi)
- Elevation: 73 m (240 ft)

Population (2025-12-31)
  - Total: 566
  - Density: 12.3/km^{2} (31.8/sq mi)
- Time zone: UTC+01:00 (CET)
  - Summer (DST): UTC+02:00 (CEST)
- Postal codes: 17237
- Dialling codes: 039825
- Vehicle registration: MST
- Website: www.amtneustrelitz-land.de

Wokuhl-Dabelow is a municipality in the district Mecklenburgische Seenplatte, in Mecklenburg-Vorpommern, Germany.

== Points of interest ==
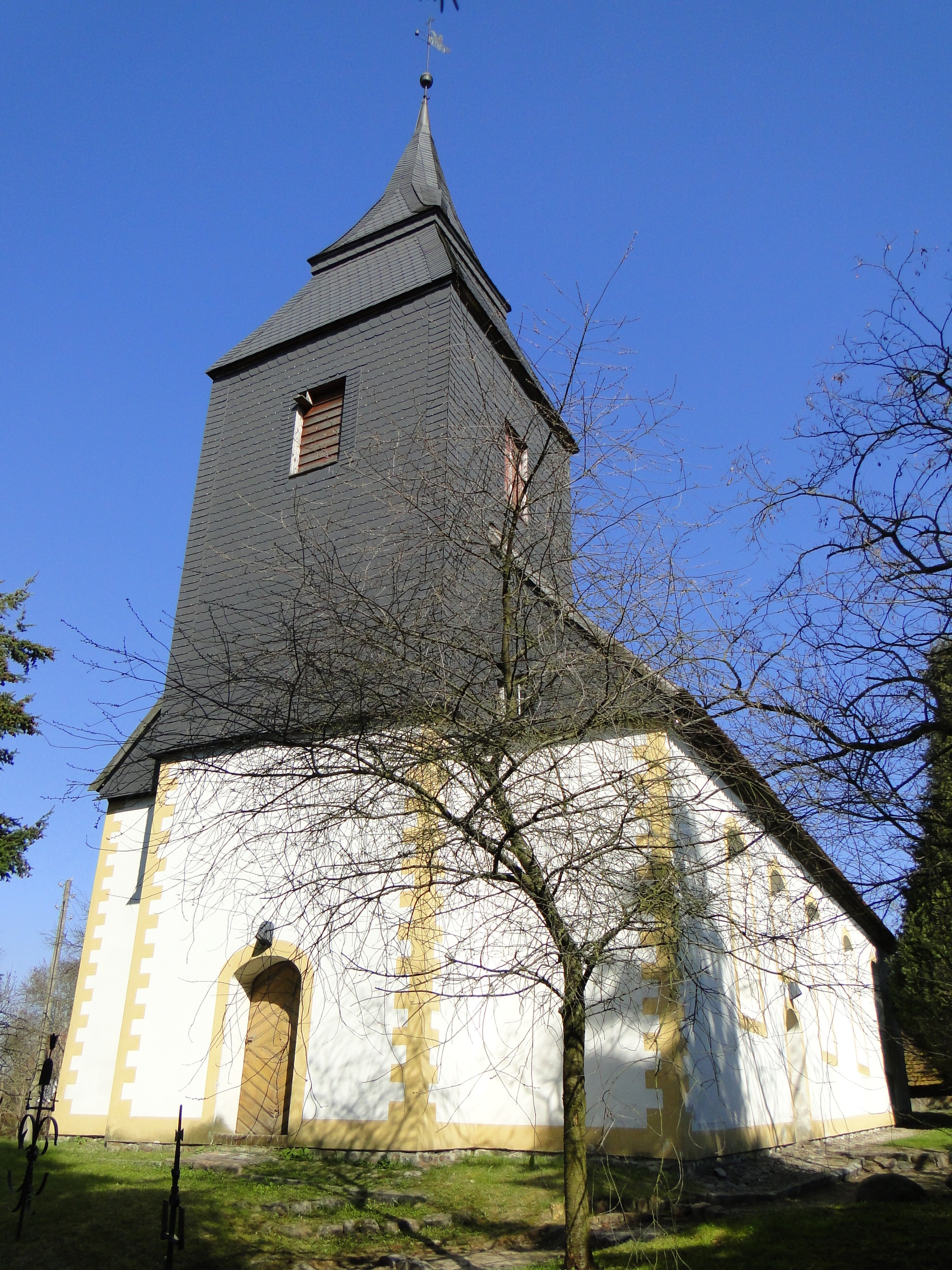
Church in Wokuhl

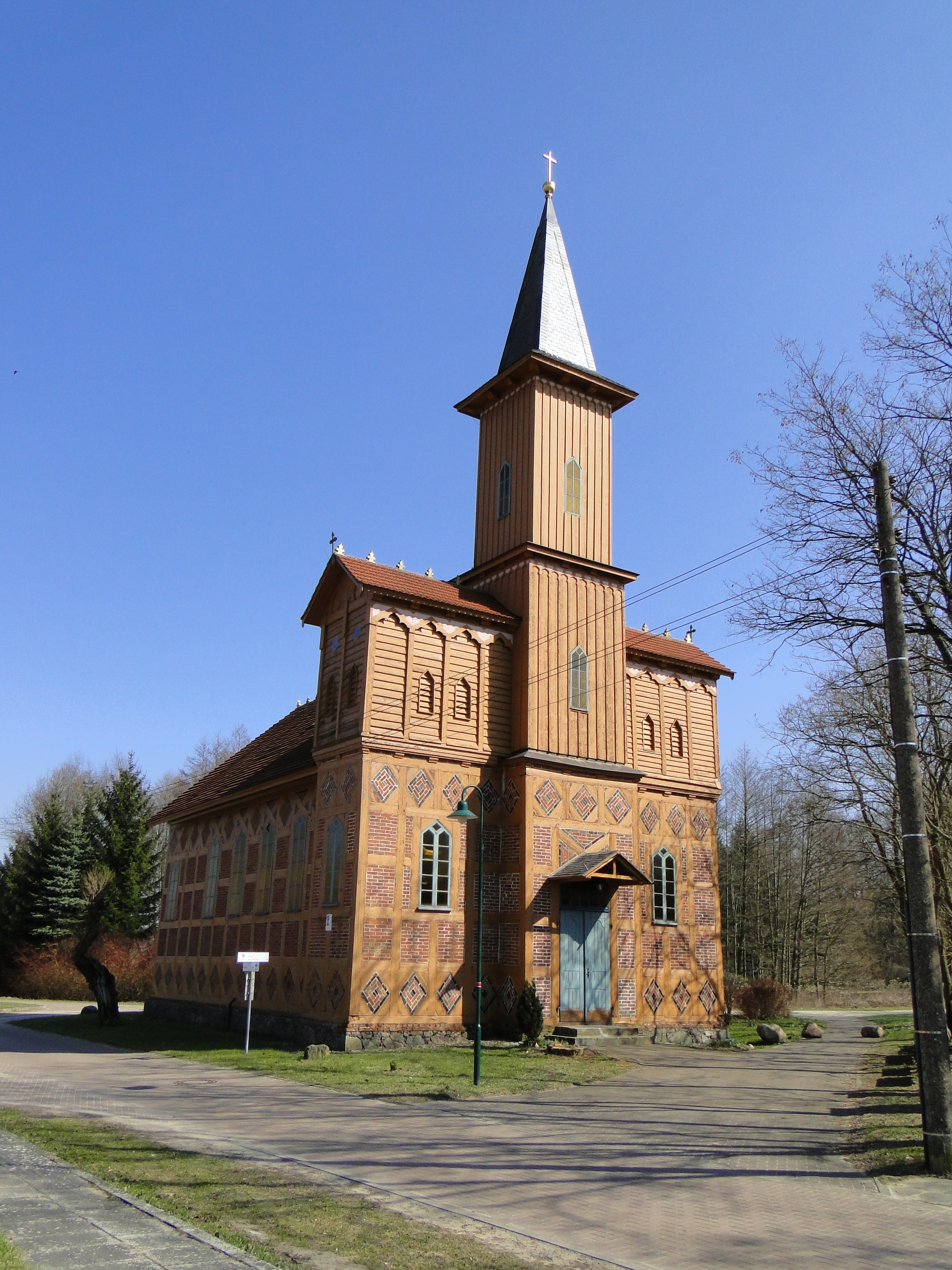
Church in Dabelow
