= Pragsdorf =

- Municipality
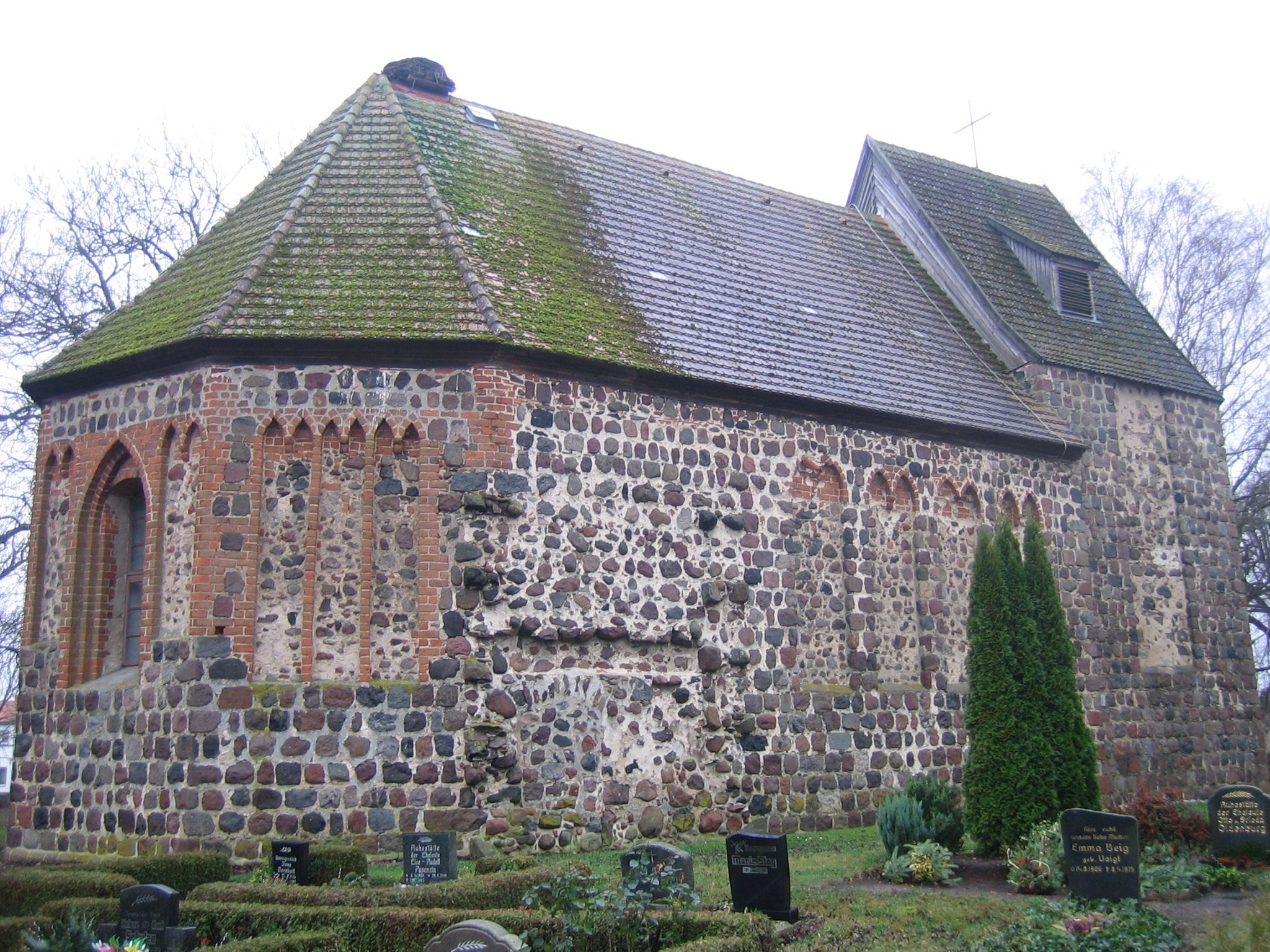
- Medieval church in Pragsdorf

- Location of Pragsdorf within Mecklenburgische Seenplatte district
- Interactive map of Pragsdorf
- Location within Germany Location within Mecklenburg-Vorpommern
- Coordinates: 53°32′08″N 13°24′00″E
- Country: Germany
- State: Mecklenburg-Vorpommern
- District: Mecklenburgische Seenplatte
- Municipal assoc.: Stargarder Land

Government
  - Mayor: Eckhardt Beitz

Area
  - Total: 14.32 km^{2} (5.53 sq mi)
- Elevation: 56 m (184 ft)

Population (2025-12-31)
  - Total: 525
  - Density: 36.7/km^{2} (95.0/sq mi)
- Time zone: UTC+01:00 (CET)
  - Summer (DST): UTC+02:00 (CEST)
- Postal codes: 17094
- Dialling codes: 03966
- Vehicle registration: MST
- Website: www.burg-stargard.de

Pragsdorf is a municipality in the district Mecklenburgische Seenplatte, in Mecklenburg-Vorpommern, Germany.
