= Datzetal =

- Municipality
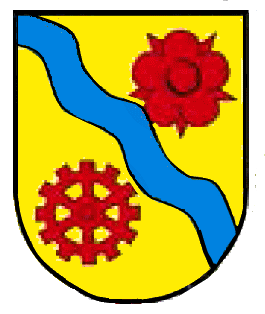
- Coat of arms

- Location of Datzetal within Mecklenburgische Seenplatte district
- Interactive map of Datzetal
- Location within Germany Location within Mecklenburg-Vorpommern
- Coordinates: 53°39′N 13°28′E
- Country: Germany
- State: Mecklenburg-Vorpommern
- District: Mecklenburgische Seenplatte
- Municipal assoc.: Friedland

Government
  - Mayor: Wilfried Koos

Area
  - Total: 41.06 km^{2} (15.85 sq mi)
- Elevation: 30 m (98 ft)

Population (2025-12-31)
  - Total: 877
  - Density: 21.4/km^{2} (55.3/sq mi)
- Time zone: UTC+01:00 (CET)
  - Summer (DST): UTC+02:00 (CEST)
- Postal codes: 17099
- Dialling codes: 039601, 039606, 039608
- Vehicle registration: MST
- Website: www.friedland-mecklenburg.de

Datzetal is a municipality in the district Mecklenburgische Seenplatte, in Mecklenburg-Vorpommern, Germany.
