= Beseritz =

- Municipality
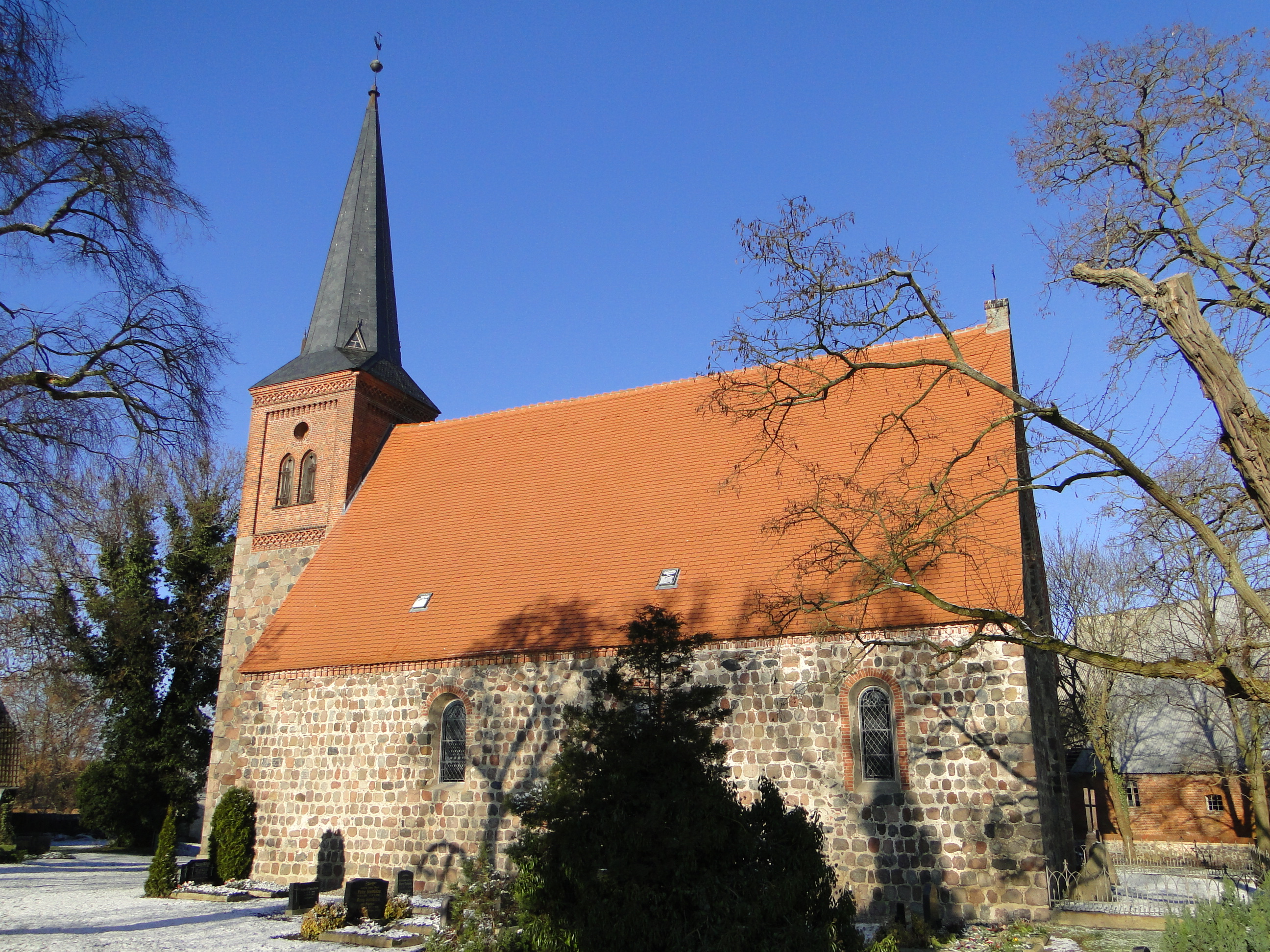
- Church

- Location of Beseritz within Mecklenburgische Seenplatte district
- Interactive map of Beseritz
- Location within Germany Location within Mecklenburg-Vorpommern
- Coordinates: 53°41′N 13°26′E
- Country: Germany
- State: Mecklenburg-Vorpommern
- District: Mecklenburgische Seenplatte
- Municipal assoc.: Neverin

Government
  - Mayor: Christian Legde

Area
  - Total: 11.10 km^{2} (4.29 sq mi)
- Elevation: 30 m (98 ft)

Population (2025-12-31)
  - Total: 125
  - Density: 11.3/km^{2} (29.2/sq mi)
- Time zone: UTC+01:00 (CET)
  - Summer (DST): UTC+02:00 (CEST)
- Postal codes: 17039
- Dialling codes: 039601
- Vehicle registration: MST
- Website: www.amt-neverin.de

Beseritz is a municipality in the Mecklenburgische Seenplatte district, in Mecklenburg-Vorpommern, Germany.
