= Blumenholz =

- Municipality
- Location of Blumenholz within Mecklenburgische Seenplatte district
- Interactive map of Blumenholz
- Location within Germany Location within Mecklenburg-Vorpommern
- Coordinates: 53°24′N 13°06′E
- Country: Germany
- State: Mecklenburg-Vorpommern
- District: Mecklenburgische Seenplatte
- Municipal assoc.: Neustrelitz-Land

Government
  - Mayor: Gerd Schock

Area
  - Total: 41.29 km^{2} (15.94 sq mi)
- Elevation: 78 m (256 ft)

Population (2025-12-31)
  - Total: 757
  - Density: 18.3/km^{2} (47.5/sq mi)
- Time zone: UTC+01:00 (CET)
  - Summer (DST): UTC+02:00 (CEST)
- Postal codes: 17237
- Dialling codes: 03981, 039824
- Vehicle registration: MST
- Website: www.amtneustrelitz-land.de

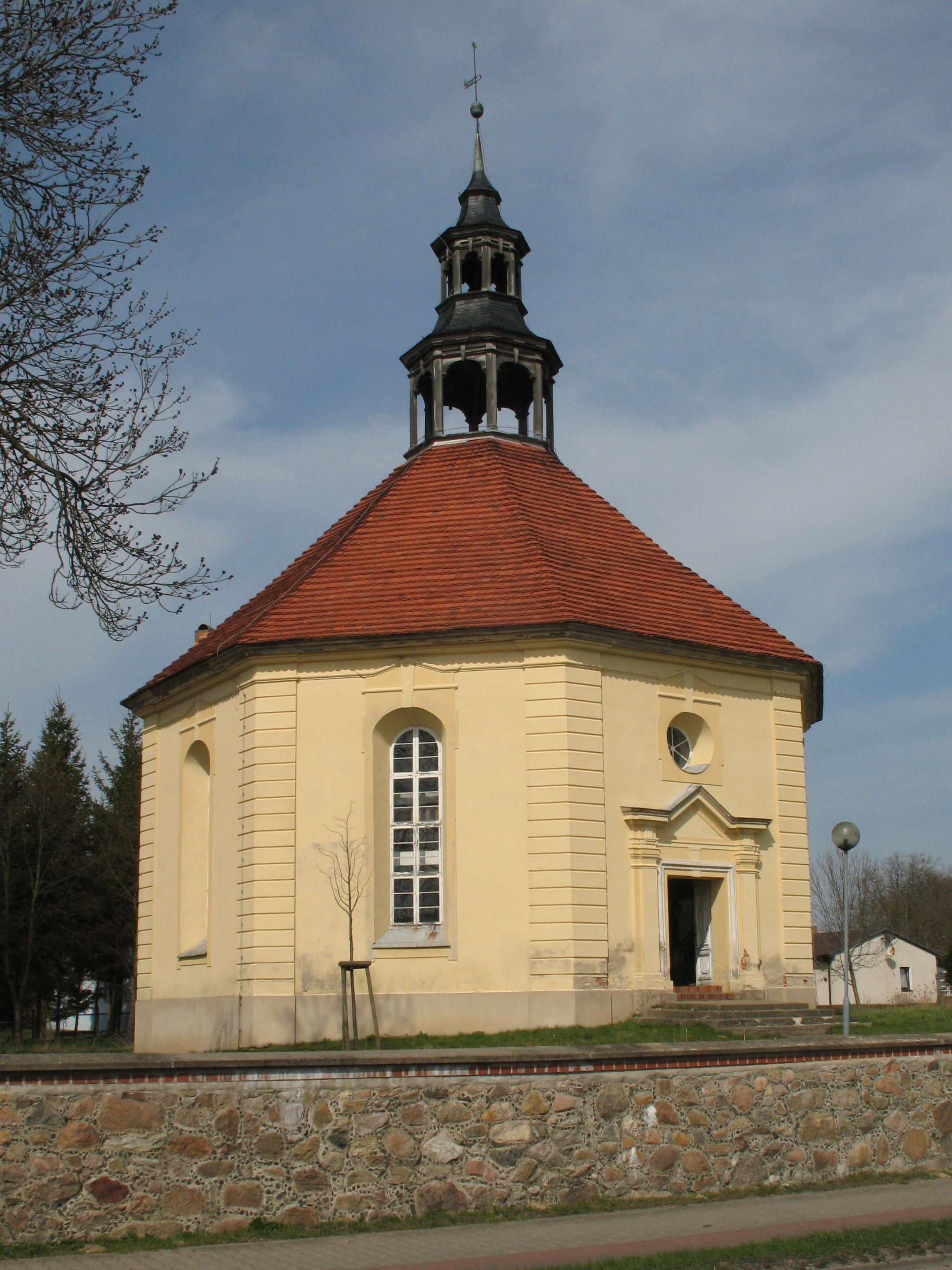
Church in Weisdin

Blumenholz is a municipality in the Mecklenburgische Seenplatte district, in Mecklenburg-Vorpommern, Germany.
