= Neuenkirchen, Mecklenburg-Strelitz =

Neuenkirchen
- Municipality
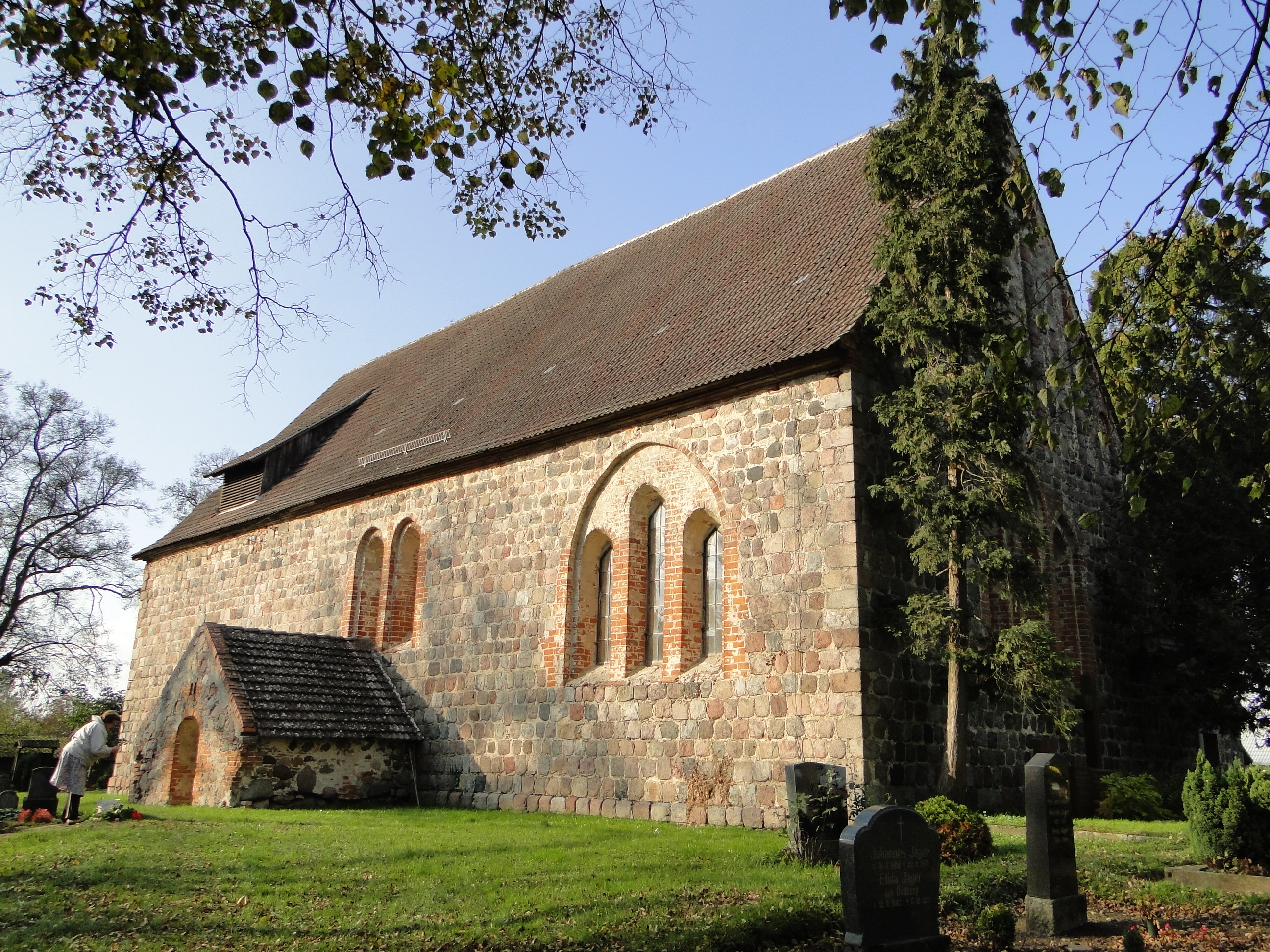
- Church in Neuenkirchen

- Location of Neuenkirchen within Mecklenburgische Seenplatte district
- Interactive map of Neuenkirchen
- Location within Germany Location within Mecklenburg-Vorpommern
- Coordinates: 53°35′N 13°21′E
- Country: Germany
- State: Mecklenburg-Vorpommern
- District: Mecklenburgische Seenplatte
- Municipal assoc.: Neverin

Government
  - Mayor: Horst Ritschel

Area
  - Total: 23.07 km^{2} (8.91 sq mi)
- Elevation: 65 m (213 ft)

Population (2025-12-31)
  - Total: 1,101
  - Density: 47.72/km^{2} (123.6/sq mi)
- Time zone: UTC+01:00 (CET)
  - Summer (DST): UTC+02:00 (CEST)
- Postal codes: 17039
- Dialling codes: 0395, 039606, 039608
- Vehicle registration: MST
- Website: www.amt-neverin.de

Neuenkirchen (German pronunciation: [ˈnɔʏənˌkɪʁçn̩]) is a municipality in the Mecklenburgische Seenplatte district, in Mecklenburg-Vorpommern, Germany.
