= Friedland (Amt) =

- Amt
- Map of Mecklenburgische Seenplatte highlighting Friedland
- Interactive map of Friedland
- Location within Germany Location within Mecklenburg-Vorpommern
- Coordinates: 53°39′N 13°32′E
- Country: Germany
- State: Mecklenburg-Vorpommern
- District: Mecklenburgische Seenplatte
- Seat: Friedland
- Subdivisions: 3 municipalities

Area
  - Total: 276.55 km^{2} (106.78 sq mi)

Population (2025-12-31)
  - Total: 7,999
  - Density: 28.92/km^{2} (74.91/sq mi)
- Time zone: UTC+01:00 (CET)
  - Summer (DST): UTC+02:00 (CEST)
- Website: www.friedland-mecklenburg.de

Friedland is an Amt in the Mecklenburgische Seenplatte district, in Mecklenburg-Vorpommern, Germany. The seat of the Amt is in Friedland.

The Amt Friedland consists of the following municipalities:

1. Datzetal
2. Friedland
3. Galenbeck
