= Neddemin =

- Municipality
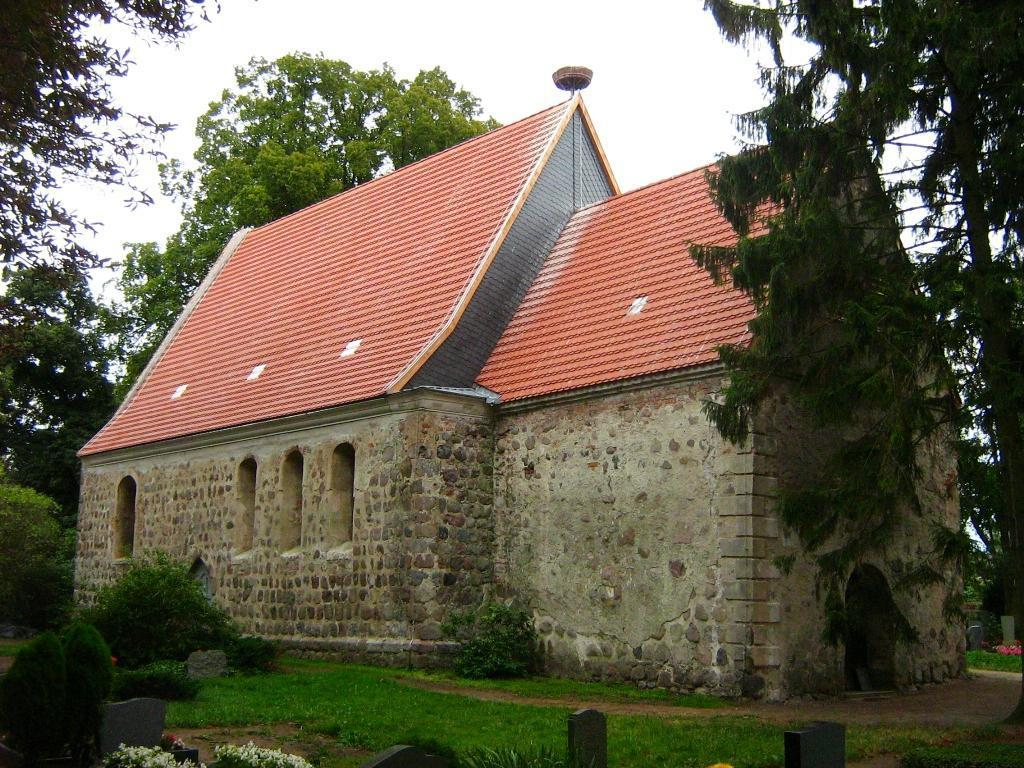
- Village church in Neddemin

- Location of Neddemin within Mecklenburgische Seenplatte district
- Interactive map of Neddemin
- Location within Germany Location within Mecklenburg-Vorpommern
- Coordinates: 53°38′N 13°17′E
- Country: Germany
- State: Mecklenburg-Vorpommern
- District: Mecklenburgische Seenplatte
- Municipal assoc.: Neverin

Government
  - Mayor: Peter Bendel

Area
  - Total: 12.53 km^{2} (4.84 sq mi)
- Elevation: 20 m (66 ft)

Population (2025-12-31)
  - Total: 335
  - Density: 26.7/km^{2} (69.2/sq mi)
- Time zone: UTC+01:00 (CET)
  - Summer (DST): UTC+02:00 (CEST)
- Postal codes: 17039
- Dialling codes: 0395, 03961
- Vehicle registration: MST
- Website: www.amt-neverin.de

Neddemin is a municipality in the district Mecklenburgische Seenplatte, in Mecklenburg-Vorpommern, Germany.
