= Godendorf =

- Municipality
- Location of Godendorf within Mecklenburgische Seenplatte district
- Interactive map of Godendorf
- Location within Germany Location within Mecklenburg-Vorpommern
- Coordinates: 53°15′N 13°08′E
- Country: Germany
- State: Mecklenburg-Vorpommern
- District: Mecklenburgische Seenplatte
- Municipal assoc.: Neustrelitz-Land

Government
  - Mayor: Christian Blank

Area
  - Total: 13.81 km^{2} (5.33 sq mi)
- Elevation: 76 m (249 ft)

Population (2025-12-31)
  - Total: 241
  - Density: 17.5/km^{2} (45.2/sq mi)
- Time zone: UTC+01:00 (CET)
  - Summer (DST): UTC+02:00 (CEST)
- Postal codes: 17237
- Dialling codes: 039825
- Vehicle registration: MST
- Website: www.amtneustrelitz-land.de

Godendorf is a municipality in the district Mecklenburgische Seenplatte, in Mecklenburg-Vorpommern, Germany.
