= Galenbeck =

- Municipality
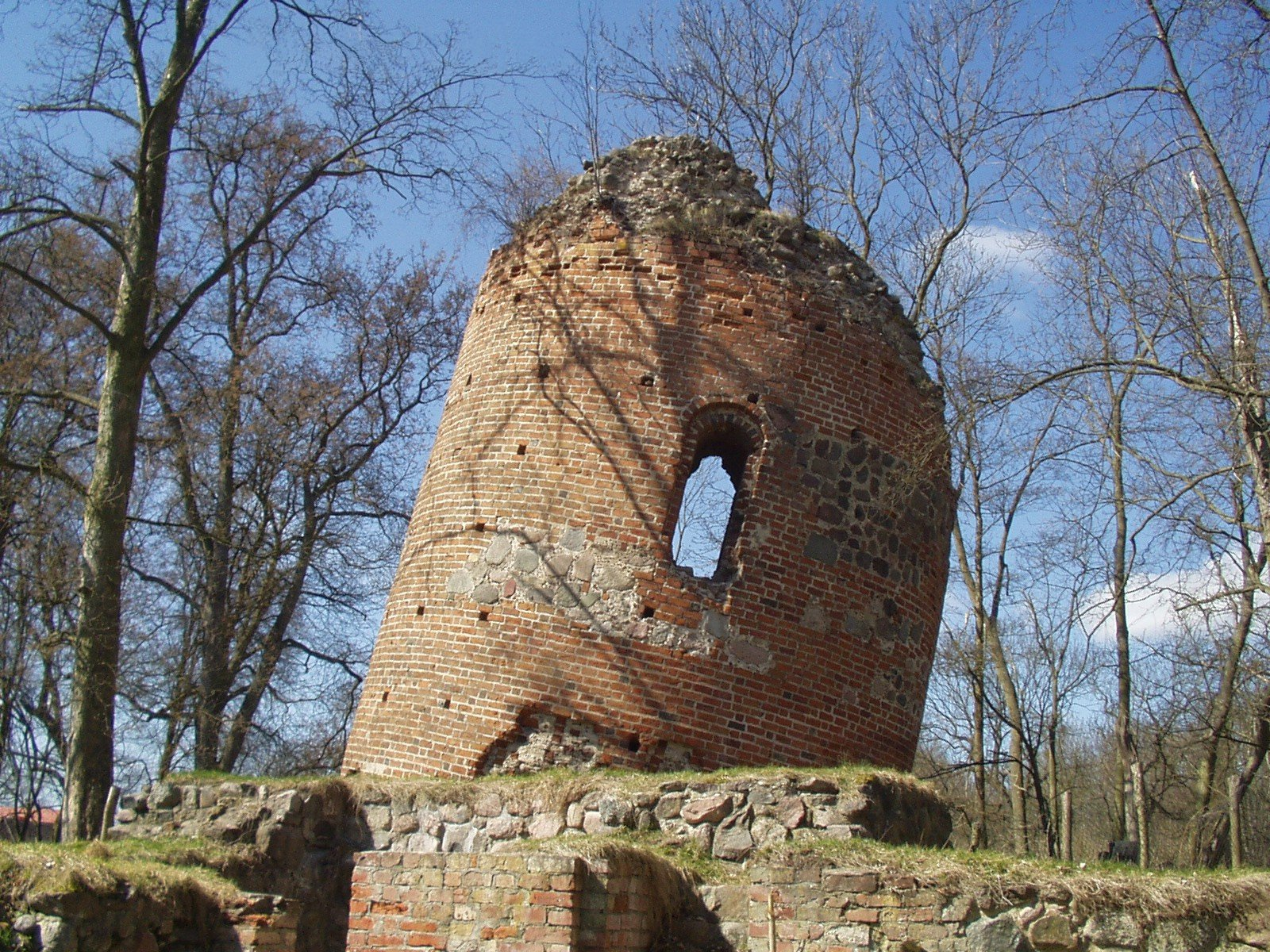
- Ruins of Burg Galenbeck in Galenbeck

- Location of Galenbeck within Mecklenburgische Seenplatte district
- Interactive map of Galenbeck
- Location within Germany Location within Mecklenburg-Vorpommern
- Coordinates: 53°38′N 13°40′E
- Country: Germany
- State: Mecklenburg-Vorpommern
- District: Mecklenburgische Seenplatte
- Municipal assoc.: Friedland

Government
  - Mayor: Thomas Herrholz

Area
  - Total: 93.56 km^{2} (36.12 sq mi)
- Elevation: 15 m (49 ft)

Population (2025-12-31)
  - Total: 1,068
  - Density: 11.42/km^{2} (29.57/sq mi)
- Time zone: UTC+01:00 (CET)
  - Summer (DST): UTC+02:00 (CEST)
- Postal codes: 17099
- Dialling codes: 039607
- Vehicle registration: MST
- Website: www.friedland-mecklenburg.de

Galenbeck is a municipality in the district Mecklenburgische Seenplatte, in Mecklenburg-Vorpommern, Germany.

De Tilleul de danse de Galenbeck is located inside it.
