= Holldorf =

- Municipality
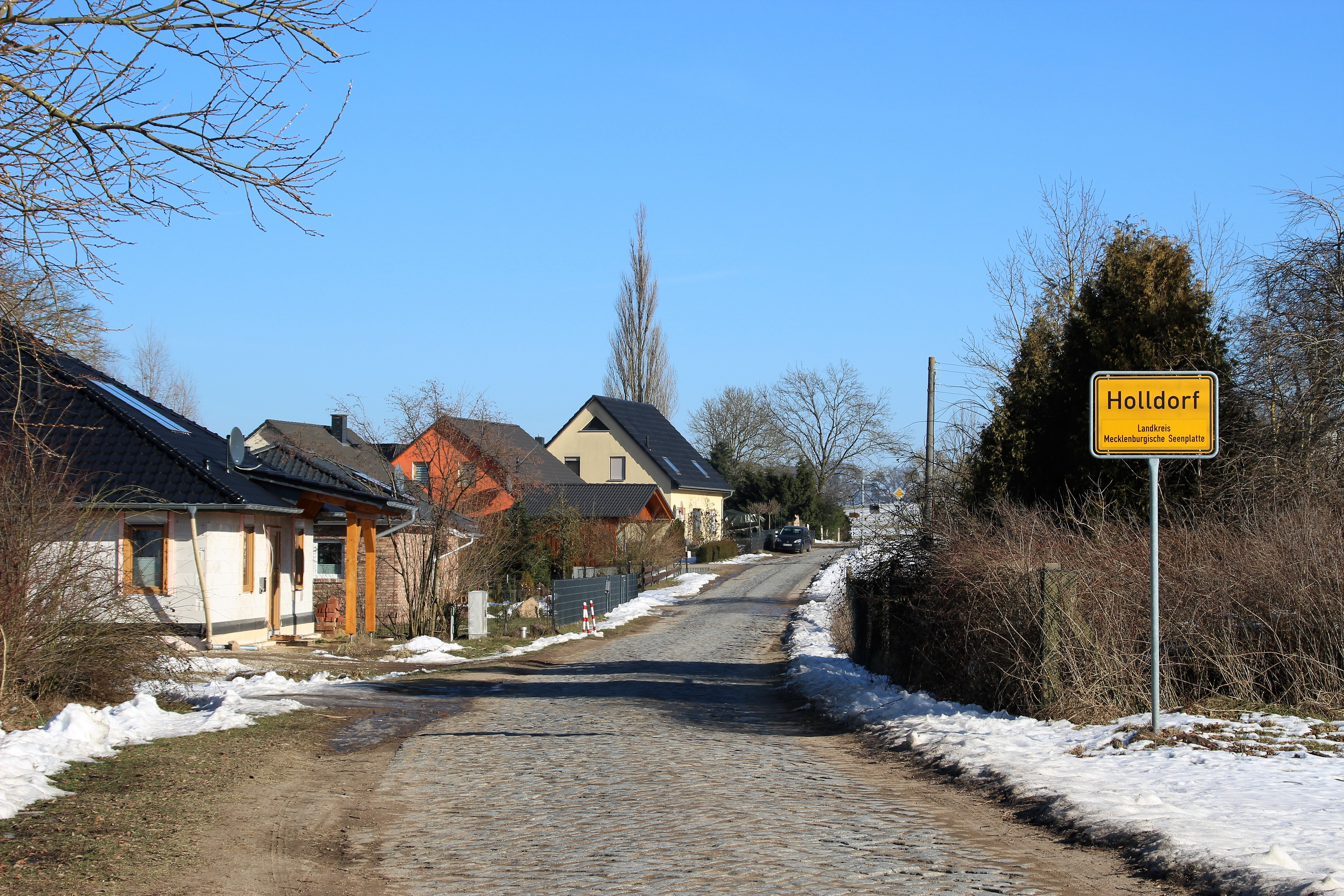
- Holldorf

- Location of Holldorf within Mecklenburgische Seenplatte district
- Interactive map of Holldorf
- Location within Germany Location within Mecklenburg-Vorpommern
- Coordinates: 53°28′N 13°16′E
- Country: Germany
- State: Mecklenburg-Vorpommern
- District: Mecklenburgische Seenplatte
- Municipal assoc.: Stargarder Land

Government
  - Mayor: Herbert Utikal

Area
  - Total: 15.69 km^{2} (6.06 sq mi)
- Elevation: 82 m (269 ft)

Population (2025-12-31)
  - Total: 745
  - Density: 47.5/km^{2} (123/sq mi)
- Time zone: UTC+01:00 (CET)
  - Summer (DST): UTC+02:00 (CEST)
- Postal codes: 17094
- Dialling codes: 039603
- Vehicle registration: MST
- Website: www.burg-stargard.de

Holldorf is a municipality in the district Mecklenburgische Seenplatte, in Mecklenburg-Vorpommern, Germany.
