= Staven =

- Municipality
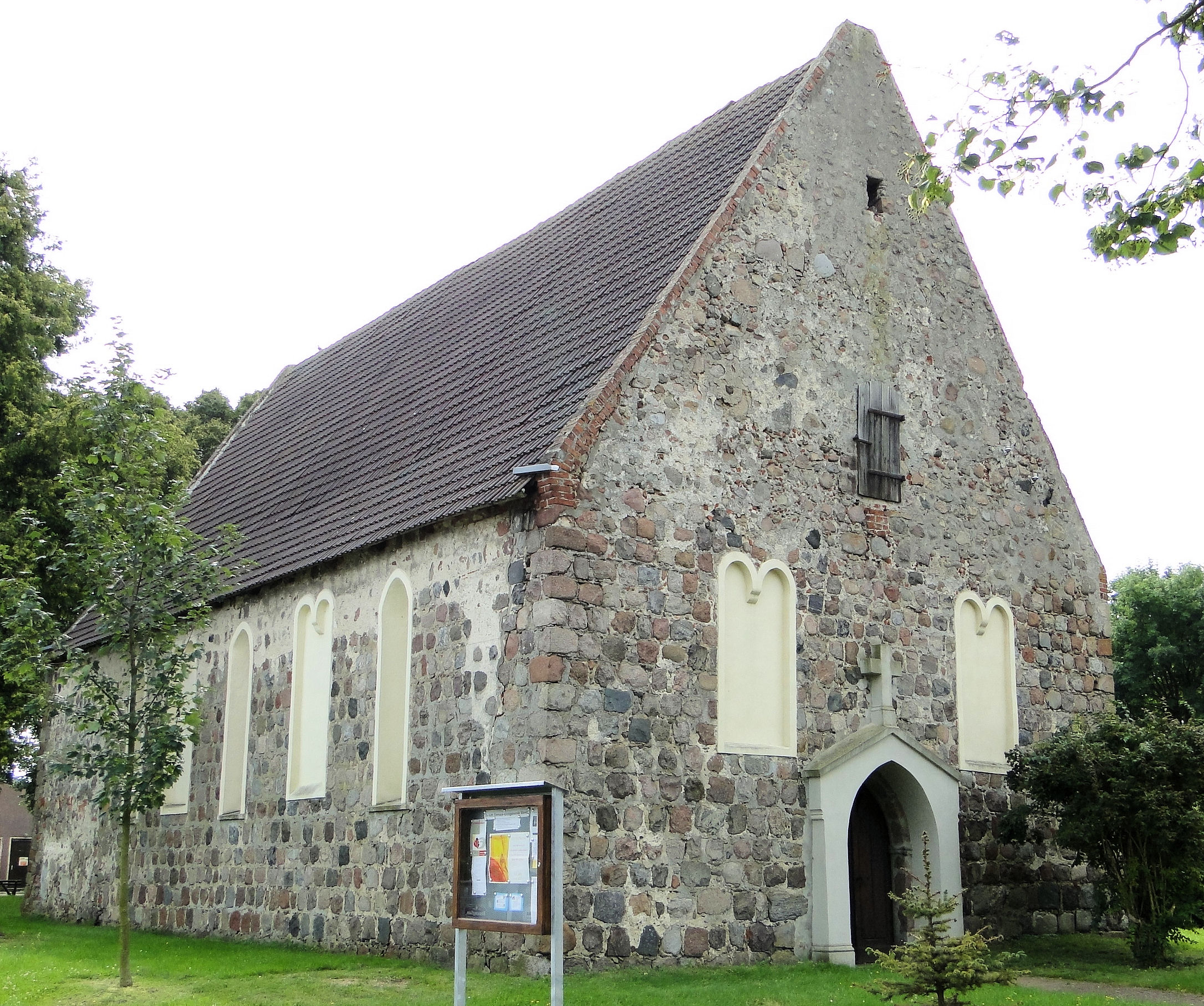
- Staven Church

- Location of Staven within Mecklenburgische Seenplatte district
- Interactive map of Staven
- Location within Germany Location within Mecklenburg-Vorpommern
- Coordinates: 53°37′N 13°24′E
- Country: Germany
- State: Mecklenburg-Vorpommern
- District: Mecklenburgische Seenplatte
- Municipal assoc.: Neverin

Government
  - Mayor: Peter Böhm

Area
  - Total: 14.67 km^{2} (5.66 sq mi)
- Elevation: 57 m (187 ft)

Population (2025-12-31)
  - Total: 340
  - Density: 23/km^{2} (60/sq mi)
- Time zone: UTC+01:00 (CET)
  - Summer (DST): UTC+02:00 (CEST)
- Postal codes: 17039
- Dialling codes: 039608
- Vehicle registration: MST
- Website: www.amt-neverin.de

Staven is a municipality in the district Mecklenburgische Seenplatte, in Mecklenburg-Vorpommern, Germany.
