= Sponholz =

- Municipality
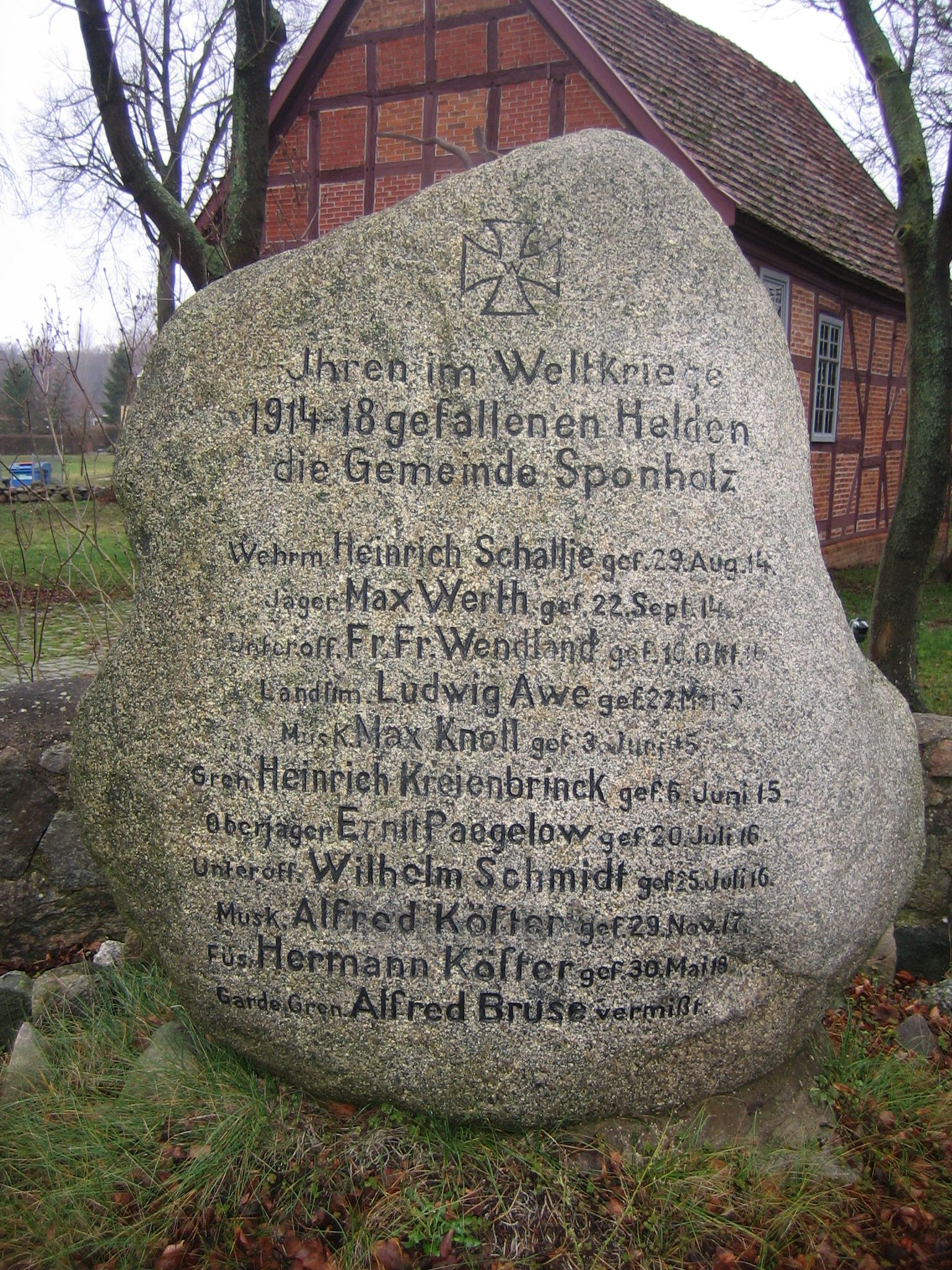
- World War I memorial in Sponholz

- Coat of arms

- Location of Sponholz within Mecklenburgische Seenplatte district
- Interactive map of Sponholz
- Location within Germany Location within Mecklenburg-Vorpommern
- Coordinates: 53°32′N 13°21′E
- Country: Germany
- State: Mecklenburg-Vorpommern
- District: Mecklenburgische Seenplatte
- Municipal assoc.: Neverin

Government
  - Mayor: Ralph-Günter Schult

Area
  - Total: 26.96 km^{2} (10.41 sq mi)
- Elevation: 45 m (148 ft)

Population (2025-12-31)
  - Total: 705
  - Density: 26.1/km^{2} (67.7/sq mi)
- Time zone: UTC+01:00 (CET)
  - Summer (DST): UTC+02:00 (CEST)
- Postal codes: 17039
- Dialling codes: 0395, 039606
- Vehicle registration: MST
- Website: www.amt-neverin.de

Sponholz is a municipality in the district Mecklenburgische Seenplatte, in Mecklenburg-Vorpommern, Germany.
