= Zirzow =

- Municipality
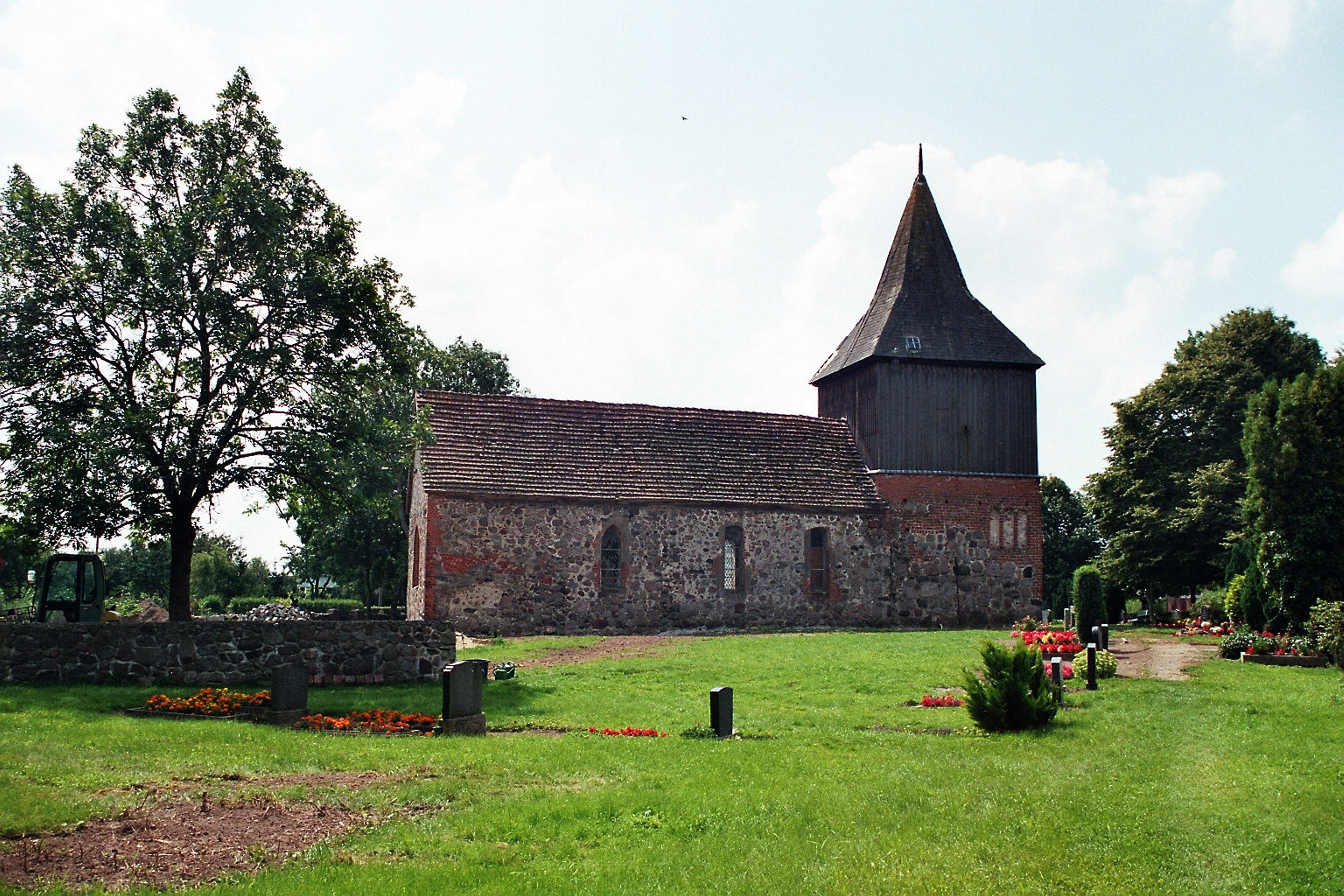
- Zirzow Church

- Coat of arms

- Location of Zirzow within Mecklenburgische Seenplatte district
- Interactive map of Zirzow
- Location within Germany Location within Mecklenburg-Vorpommern
- Coordinates: 53°35′N 13°11′E
- Country: Germany
- State: Mecklenburg-Vorpommern
- District: Mecklenburgische Seenplatte
- Municipal assoc.: Neverin

Government
  - Mayor: Waltraut Nath

Area
  - Total: 9.33 km^{2} (3.60 sq mi)
- Elevation: 50 m (160 ft)

Population (2025-12-31)
  - Total: 339
  - Density: 36.3/km^{2} (94.1/sq mi)
- Time zone: UTC+01:00 (CET)
  - Summer (DST): UTC+02:00 (CEST)
- Postal codes: 17039
- Dialling codes: 0395
- Vehicle registration: MST
- Website: amtneverin.de

Zirzow is a municipality in the district Mecklenburgische Seenplatte, in Mecklenburg-Vorpommern, in north-eastern Germany.

== History ==
During the final stages of World War II, on 21 February 1945, Zirzow was the site of a stopover during the German-organised march of Polish prisoners of war from the Oflag II-D camp.
