= Neustrelitz-Land =

Administrative division in Mecklenburg-Vorpommern, Germany

- Amt
- Map of Mecklenburgische Seenplatte highlighting Neustrelitz-Land
- Interactive map of Neustrelitz-Land
- Location within Germany Location within Mecklenburg-Vorpommern
- Coordinates: 53°21′N 13°03′E
- Country: Germany
- State: Mecklenburg-Vorpommern
- District: Mecklenburgische Seenplatte
- Seat: Neustrelitz
- Subdivisions: 11 municipalities

Area
  - Total: 450.15 km^{2} (173.80 sq mi)

Population (2025-12-31)
  - Total: 7,204
  - Density: 16.00/km^{2} (41.45/sq mi)
- Time zone: UTC+01:00 (CET)
  - Summer (DST): UTC+02:00 (CEST)
- Website: www.amtneustrelitz-land.de

Neustrelitz-Land is an Amt in the Mecklenburgische Seenplatte district, in Mecklenburg-Vorpommern, Germany. The seat of the Amt is in Neustrelitz, itself not part of the Amt.

The Amt Neustrelitz-Land consists of the following municipalities:

1. Blankensee
2. Blumenholz
3. Carpin
4. Godendorf
5. Grünow
6. Hohenzieritz
7. Klein Vielen
8. Kratzeburg
9. Möllenbeck
10. Userin
11. Wokuhl-Dabelow
