= Wulkenzin =

- Municipality
- Coat of arms

- Location of Wulkenzin within Mecklenburgische Seenplatte district
- Interactive map of Wulkenzin
- Location within Germany Location within Mecklenburg-Vorpommern
- Coordinates: 53°31′N 13°09′E
- Country: Germany
- State: Mecklenburg-Vorpommern
- District: Mecklenburgische Seenplatte
- Municipal assoc.: Neverin

Government
  - Mayor: Dagmar Möller

Area
  - Total: 21.55 km^{2} (8.32 sq mi)
- Elevation: 56 m (184 ft)

Population (2025-12-31)
  - Total: 1,500
  - Density: 70/km^{2} (180/sq mi)
- Time zone: UTC+01:00 (CET)
  - Summer (DST): UTC+02:00 (CEST)
- Postal codes: 17039
- Dialling codes: 0395, 03962
- Vehicle registration: MST
- Website: www.wulkenzin.de

Wulkenzin is a municipality in the district Mecklenburgische Seenplatte, in Mecklenburg-Vorpommern, Germany.
