= Woldegk (Amt) =

Amt in Mecklenburg-Vorpommern, Germany

- Amt
- Map of Mecklenburgische Seenplatte highlighting Woldegk
- Interactive map of Woldegk
- Location within Germany Location within Mecklenburg-Vorpommern
- Coordinates: 53°30′N 13°35′E
- Country: Germany
- State: Mecklenburg-Vorpommern
- District: Mecklenburgische Seenplatte
- Seat: Woldegk
- Subdivisions: 7 municipalities

Area
  - Total: 361.03 km^{2} (139.39 sq mi)

Population (2025-12-31)
  - Total: 6,088
  - Density: 16.86/km^{2} (43.67/sq mi)
- Time zone: UTC+01:00 (CET)
  - Summer (DST): UTC+02:00 (CEST)
- Website: www.amt.windmuehlenstadt-woldegk.de

Woldegk is an Amt in the Mecklenburgische Seenplatte district, in Mecklenburg-Vorpommern, Germany. The seat of the Amt is in Woldegk.

The Amt Woldegk consists of the following municipalities:

1. Groß Miltzow
2. Kublank
3. Neetzka
4. Schönbeck
5. Schönhausen
6. Voigtsdorf
7. Woldegk
