= Blankenhof =

- Municipality
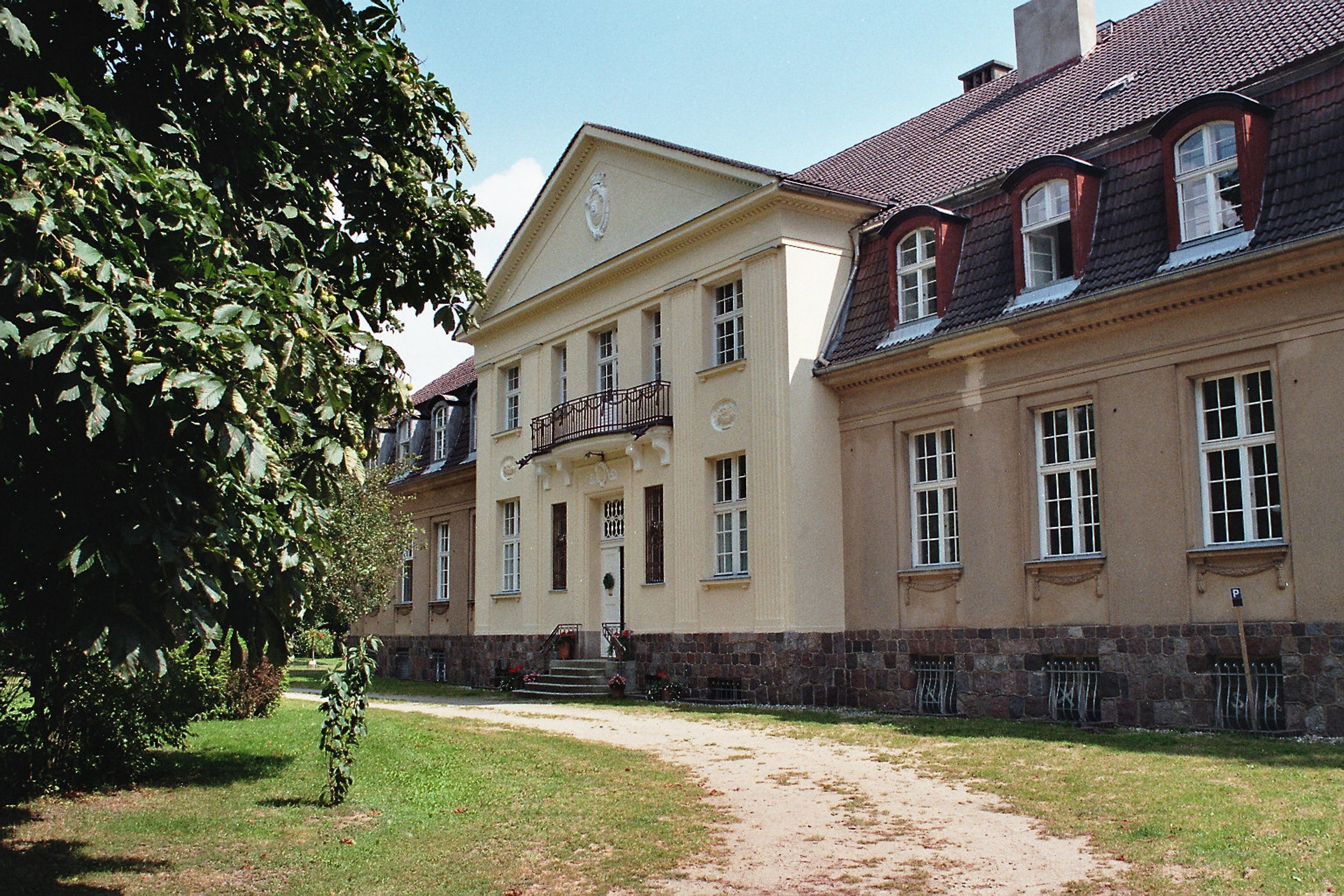
- Former Indianermuseum Gevezin in Blankenhof

- Location of Blankenhof within Mecklenburgische Seenplatte district
- Interactive map of Blankenhof
- Location within Germany Location within Mecklenburg-Vorpommern
- Coordinates: 53°34′N 13°07′E
- Country: Germany
- State: Mecklenburg-Vorpommern
- District: Mecklenburgische Seenplatte
- Municipal assoc.: Neverin

Government
  - Mayor: Rita Borgwart

Area
  - Total: 18.23 km^{2} (7.04 sq mi)
- Elevation: 55 m (180 ft)

Population (2025-12-31)
  - Total: 702
  - Density: 38.5/km^{2} (99.7/sq mi)
- Time zone: UTC+01:00 (CET)
  - Summer (DST): UTC+02:00 (CEST)
- Postal codes: 17039
- Dialling codes: 0395, 03962
- Vehicle registration: MST
- Website: www.amt-neverin.de

Blankenhof is a municipality in the Mecklenburgische Seenplatte district, in Mecklenburg-Vorpommern, Germany. The districts of Chemnitz and Gevezin belong to Blankenhof.
