= Lindetal =

- Municipality
- Location of Lindetal within Mecklenburgische Seenplatte district
- Interactive map of Lindetal
- Location within Germany Location within Mecklenburg-Vorpommern
- Coordinates: 53°28′43″N 13°25′52″E
- Country: Germany
- State: Mecklenburg-Vorpommern
- District: Mecklenburgische Seenplatte
- Municipal assoc.: Stargarder Land
- Subdivisions: 7

Government
  - Mayor: Michael Scheidt

Area
  - Total: 56.33 km^{2} (21.75 sq mi)
- Elevation: 100 m (330 ft)

Population (2025-12-31)
  - Total: 1,141
  - Density: 20.26/km^{2} (52.46/sq mi)
- Time zone: UTC+01:00 (CET)
  - Summer (DST): UTC+02:00 (CEST)
- Postal codes: 17349
- Dialling codes: 03964, 03966
- Vehicle registration: MST
- Website: www.burg-stargard.de

Lindetal is a municipality in the district Mecklenburgische Seenplatte, in Mecklenburg-Vorpommern, Germany.
