= Schönhausen, Mecklenburg-Vorpommern =

Schönhausen
- Municipality
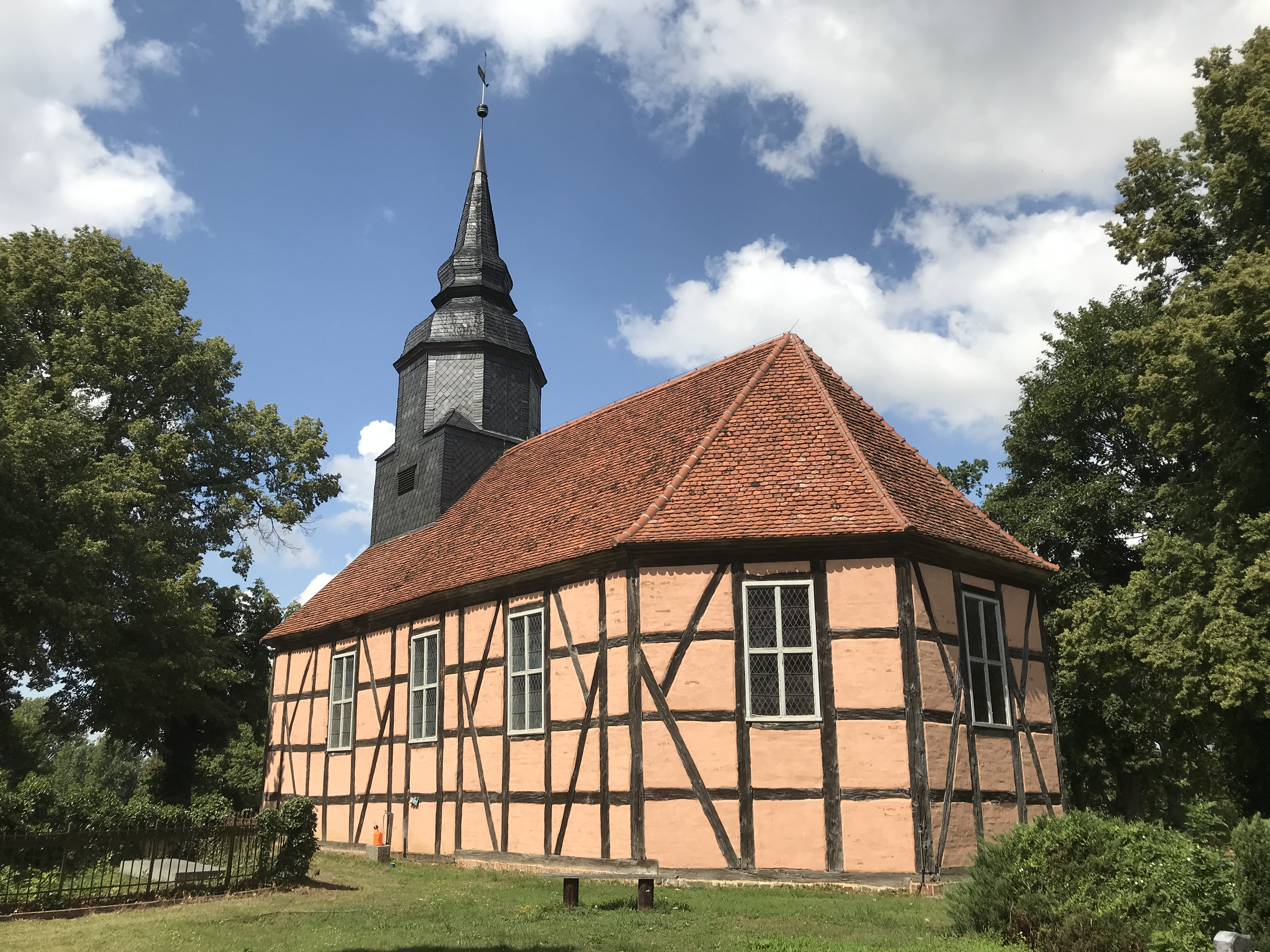
- Schönhausen Church

- Location of Schönhausen within Mecklenburgische Seenplatte district
- Interactive map of Schönhausen
- Location within Germany Location within Mecklenburg-Vorpommern
- Coordinates: 53°32′N 13°41′E
- Country: Germany
- State: Mecklenburg-Vorpommern
- District: Mecklenburgische Seenplatte
- Municipal assoc.: Woldegk

Government
  - Mayor: Hannelore Schulz

Area
  - Total: 18.75 km^{2} (7.24 sq mi)
- Elevation: 86 m (282 ft)

Population (2025-12-31)
  - Total: 205
  - Density: 10.9/km^{2} (28.3/sq mi)
- Time zone: UTC+01:00 (CET)
  - Summer (DST): UTC+02:00 (CEST)
- Postal codes: 17337
- Dialling codes: 039753
- Vehicle registration: MST
- Website: www.amt-woldegk.de

Schönhausen (German pronunciation: [ʃøːnˈhaʊzn̩]) is a municipality in the Mecklenburgische Seenplatte district, in Mecklenburg-Vorpommern, Germany.
