= Schönbeck =

- Municipality
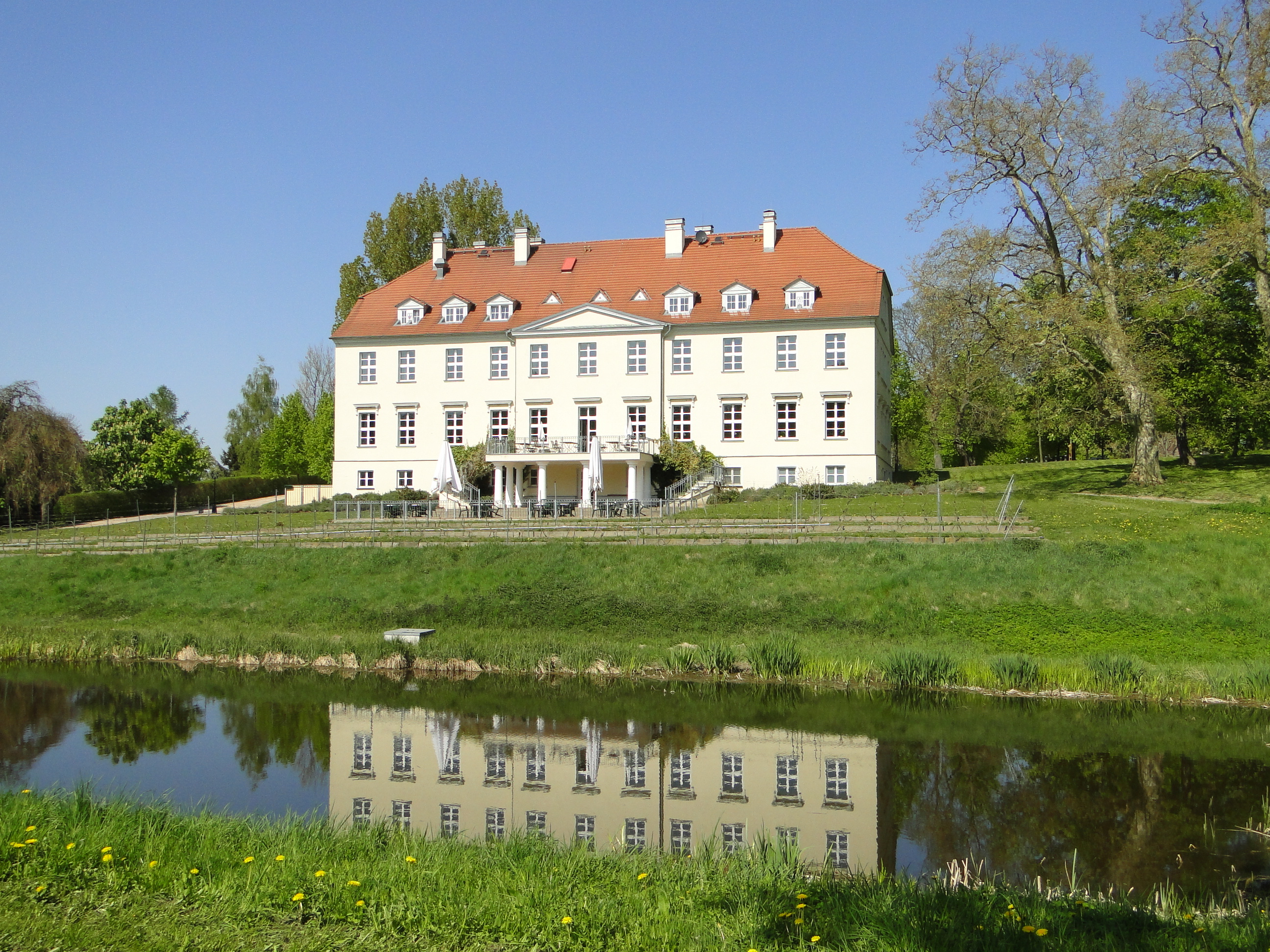
- Schloss Rattey in Schönbeck

- Location of Schönbeck within Mecklenburgische Seenplatte district
- Interactive map of Schönbeck
- Location within Germany Location within Mecklenburg-Vorpommern
- Coordinates: 53°34′N 13°34′E
- Country: Germany
- State: Mecklenburg-Vorpommern
- District: Mecklenburgische Seenplatte
- Municipal assoc.: Woldegk

Government
  - Mayor: Siegfried Hilbrich

Area
  - Total: 24.33 km^{2} (9.39 sq mi)
- Elevation: 55 m (180 ft)

Population (2025-12-31)
  - Total: 453
  - Density: 18.6/km^{2} (48.2/sq mi)
- Time zone: UTC+01:00 (CET)
  - Summer (DST): UTC+02:00 (CEST)
- Postal codes: 17349
- Dialling codes: 03968
- Vehicle registration: MST
- Website: www.amt-woldegk.de

Schönbeck is a municipality in the district Mecklenburgische Seenplatte, in Mecklenburg-Vorpommern, Germany. This is the headquarters of German beer-making in the northeastern part of Germany.
