= Neetzka =

- Municipality
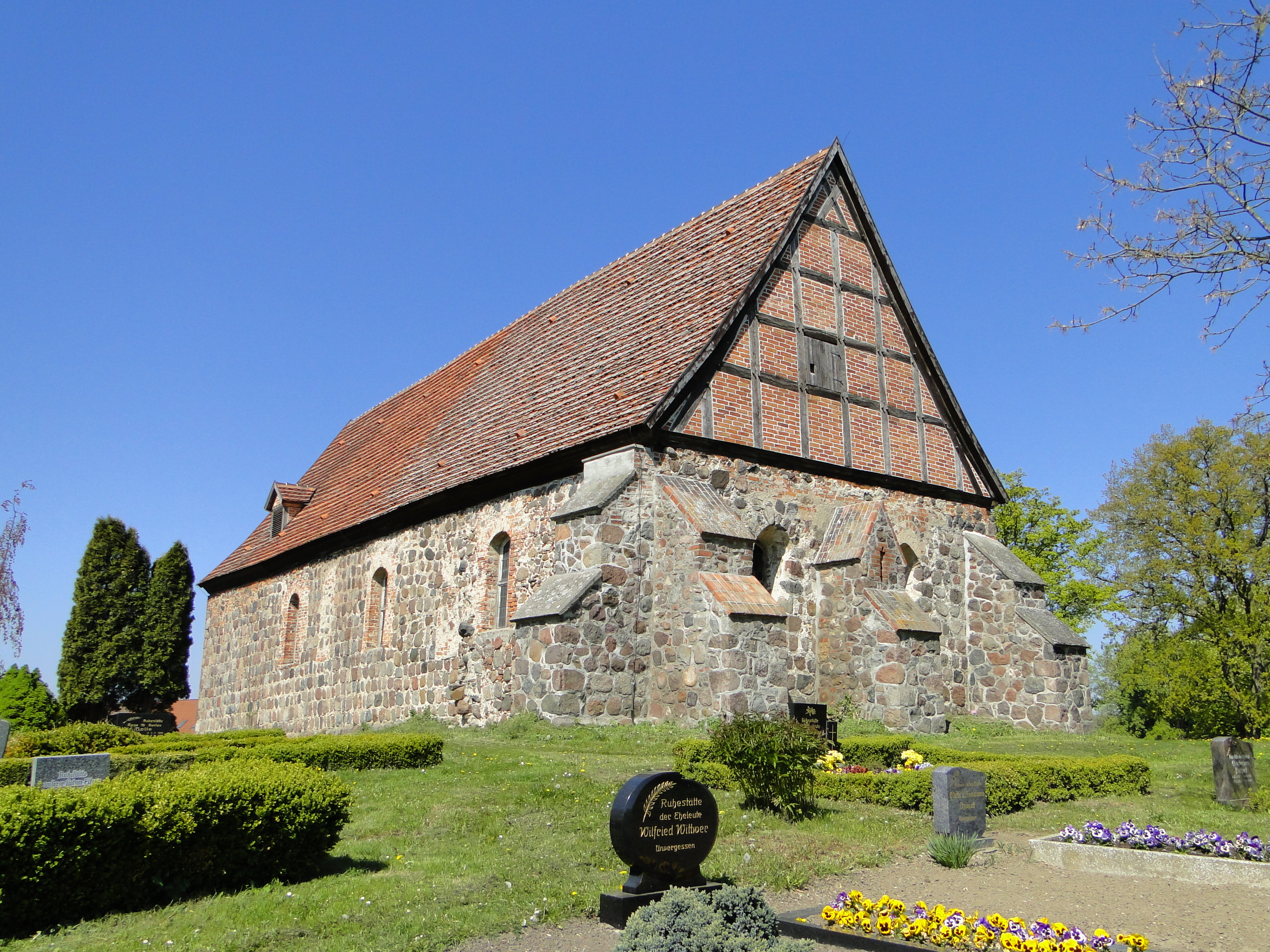
- Church

- Location of Neetzka within Mecklenburgische Seenplatte district
- Interactive map of Neetzka
- Location within Germany Location within Mecklenburg-Vorpommern
- Coordinates: 53°31′N 13°31′E
- Country: Germany
- State: Mecklenburg-Vorpommern
- District: Mecklenburgische Seenplatte
- Municipal assoc.: Woldegk

Government
  - Mayor: Volker Dreschel

Area
  - Total: 13.37 km^{2} (5.16 sq mi)
- Elevation: 88 m (289 ft)

Population (2025-12-31)
  - Total: 221
  - Density: 16.5/km^{2} (42.8/sq mi)
- Time zone: UTC+01:00 (CET)
  - Summer (DST): UTC+02:00 (CEST)
- Postal codes: 17349
- Dialling codes: 03966, 03968
- Vehicle registration: MST
- Website: www.neetzka.de

Neetzka is a municipality in the district Mecklenburgische Seenplatte, in Mecklenburg-Vorpommern, Germany.
