= Voigtsdorf =

- Municipality
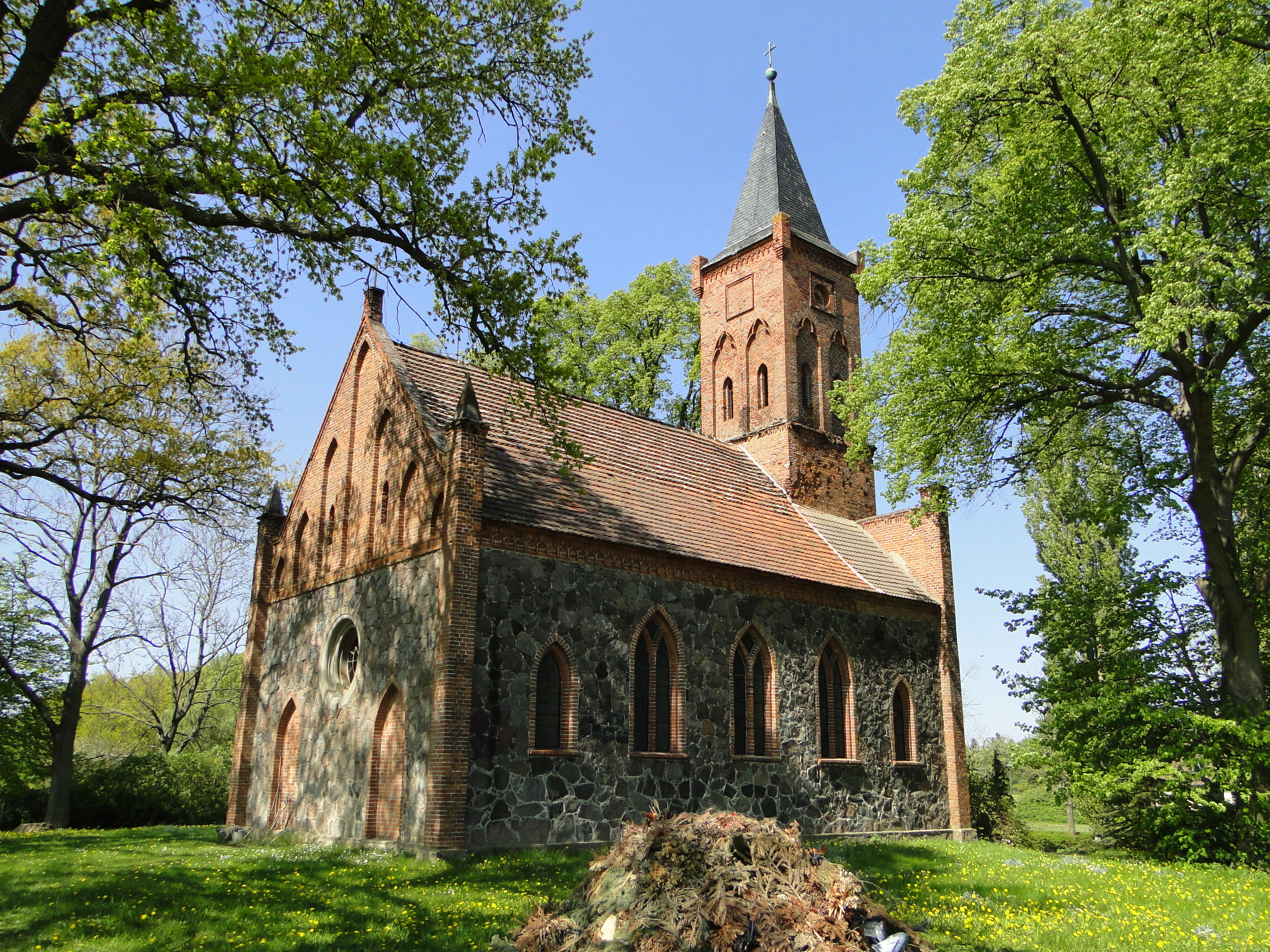
- Voigtsdorf Church

- Location of Voigtsdorf within Mecklenburgische Seenplatte district
- Interactive map of Voigtsdorf
- Location within Germany Location within Mecklenburg-Vorpommern
- Coordinates: 53°34′N 13°38′E
- Country: Germany
- State: Mecklenburg-Vorpommern
- District: Mecklenburgische Seenplatte
- Municipal assoc.: Woldegk

Government
  - Mayor: Isolde Deutschmann

Area
  - Total: 7.62 km^{2} (2.94 sq mi)
- Elevation: 83 m (272 ft)

Population (2025-12-31)
  - Total: 96
  - Density: 13/km^{2} (33/sq mi)
- Time zone: UTC+01:00 (CET)
  - Summer (DST): UTC+02:00 (CEST)
- Postal codes: 17348
- Dialling codes: 03968, 039753
- Vehicle registration: MST
- Website: www.amt-woldegk.de

Voigtsdorf (German pronunciation: [ˈfoːktsdɔʁf]) is a municipality in the district Mecklenburgische Seenplatte, in Mecklenburg-Vorpommern, Germany.
