= Neverin =

- Municipality
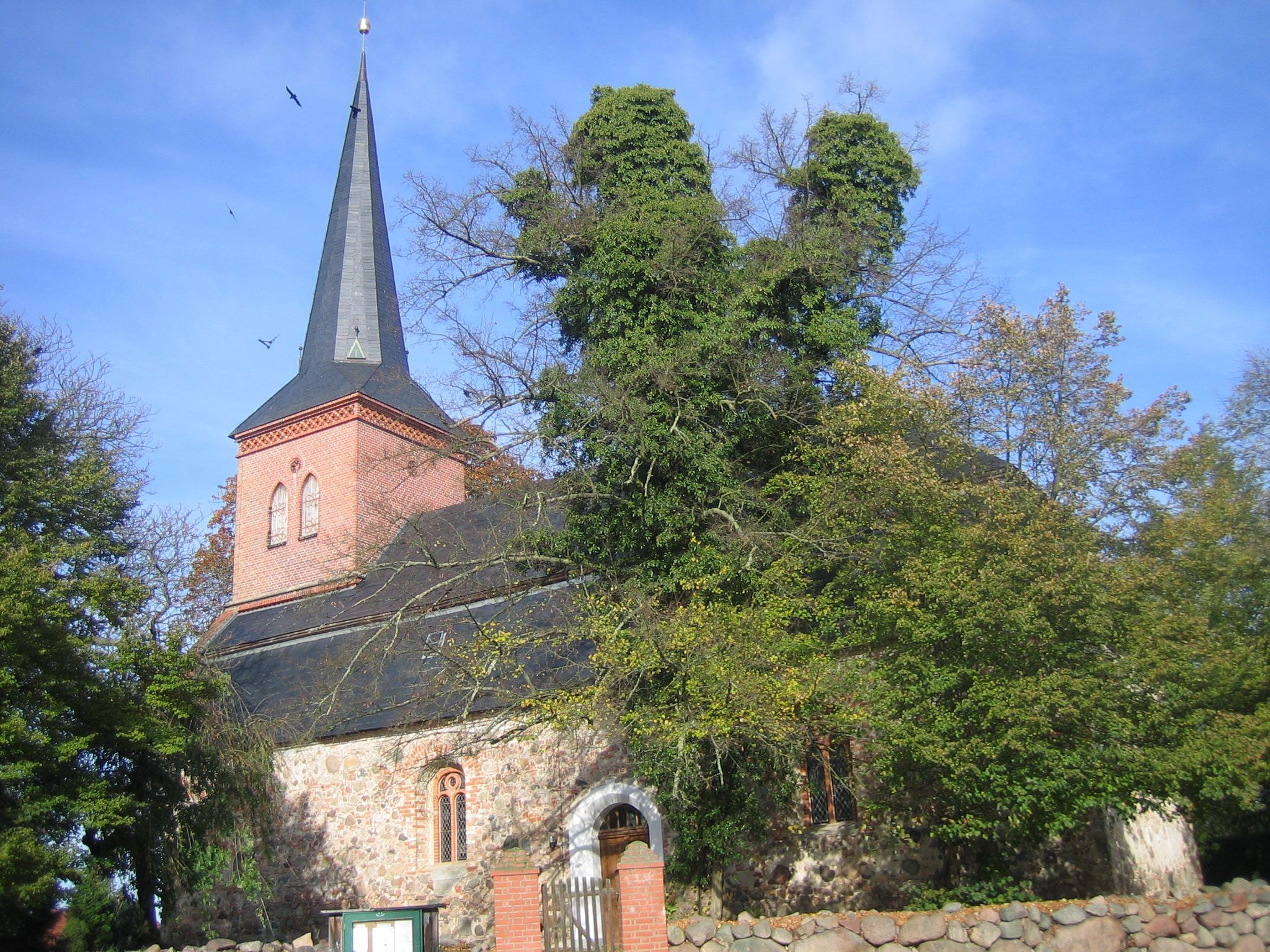
- Church

- Location of Neverin within Mecklenburgische Seenplatte district
- Interactive map of Neverin
- Location within Germany Location within Mecklenburg-Vorpommern
- Coordinates: 53°37′9″N 13°20′20″E
- Country: Germany
- State: Mecklenburg-Vorpommern
- District: Mecklenburgische Seenplatte
- Municipal assoc.: Neverin

Government
  - Mayor: Helmut Frosch

Area
  - Total: 13.28 km^{2} (5.13 sq mi)
- Elevation: 62 m (203 ft)

Population (2025-12-31)
  - Total: 1,008
  - Density: 75.90/km^{2} (196.6/sq mi)
- Time zone: UTC+01:00 (CET)
  - Summer (DST): UTC+02:00 (CEST)
- Postal codes: 17039
- Dialling codes: 039608
- Vehicle registration: MST
- Website: www.amt-neverin.de

Neverin is a municipality in the district Mecklenburgische Seenplatte, in Mecklenburg-Vorpommern, Germany.
