= Kublank =

- Municipality
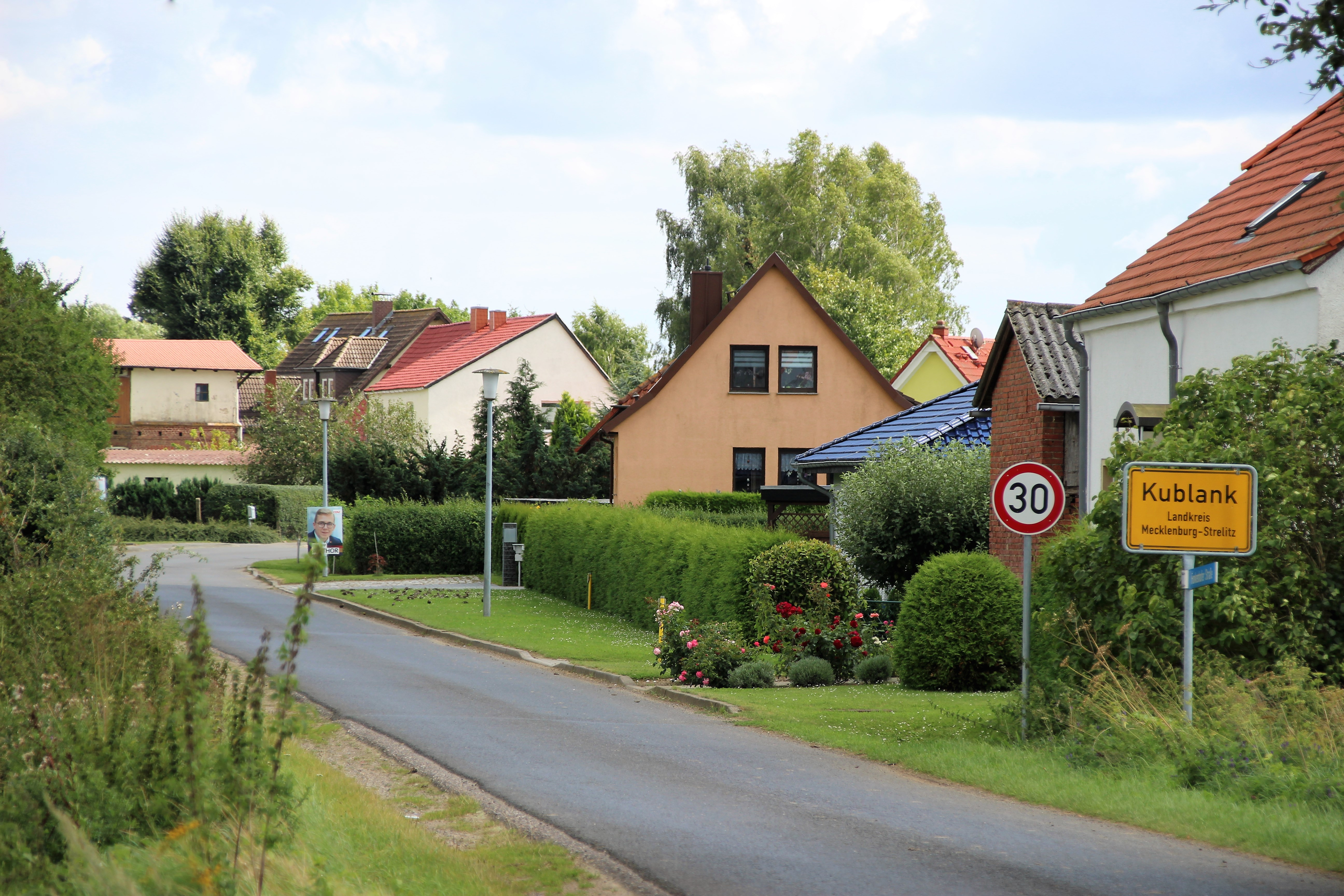
- Kublank

- Location of Kublank within Mecklenburgische Seenplatte district
- Interactive map of Kublank
- Location within Germany Location within Mecklenburg-Vorpommern
- Coordinates: 53°32′N 13°29′E
- Country: Germany
- State: Mecklenburg-Vorpommern
- District: Mecklenburgische Seenplatte
- Municipal assoc.: Woldegk

Government
  - Mayor: Reinhard Dust

Area
  - Total: 13.49 km^{2} (5.21 sq mi)
- Elevation: 85 m (279 ft)

Population (2025-12-31)
  - Total: 153
  - Density: 11.3/km^{2} (29.4/sq mi)
- Time zone: UTC+01:00 (CET)
  - Summer (DST): UTC+02:00 (CEST)
- Postal codes: 17348
- Dialling codes: 03968
- Vehicle registration: MST
- Website: www.amt-woldegk.de

Kublank is a municipality in the district Mecklenburgische Seenplatte, in Mecklenburg-Vorpommern, in north-eastern Germany.

== History ==
During the final stages of World War II, on 16 February 1945, Kublank was the site of a stopover during the German-organised march of some 6,000 Polish prisoners of war from the Oflag II-D camp headed westwards.
