= Cammin (Burg Stargard) =

Village in Mecklenburg-Vorpommern, Germany

- Ortsteil of Burg Stargard
- Interactive map of Cammin
- Location within Germany Location within Mecklenburg-Vorpommern
- Coordinates: 53°25′N 13°17′E
- Country: Germany
- State: Mecklenburg-Vorpommern
- District: Mecklenburgische Seenplatte
- Town: Burg Stargard

Area
  - Total: 14.87 km^{2} (5.74 sq mi)
- Elevation: 76 m (249 ft)

Population (2012-12-31)
  - Total: 298
  - Density: 20.0/km^{2} (51.9/sq mi)
- Time zone: UTC+01:00 (CET)
  - Summer (DST): UTC+02:00 (CEST)
- Postal codes: 17094
- Dialling codes: 039603
- Vehicle registration: MST

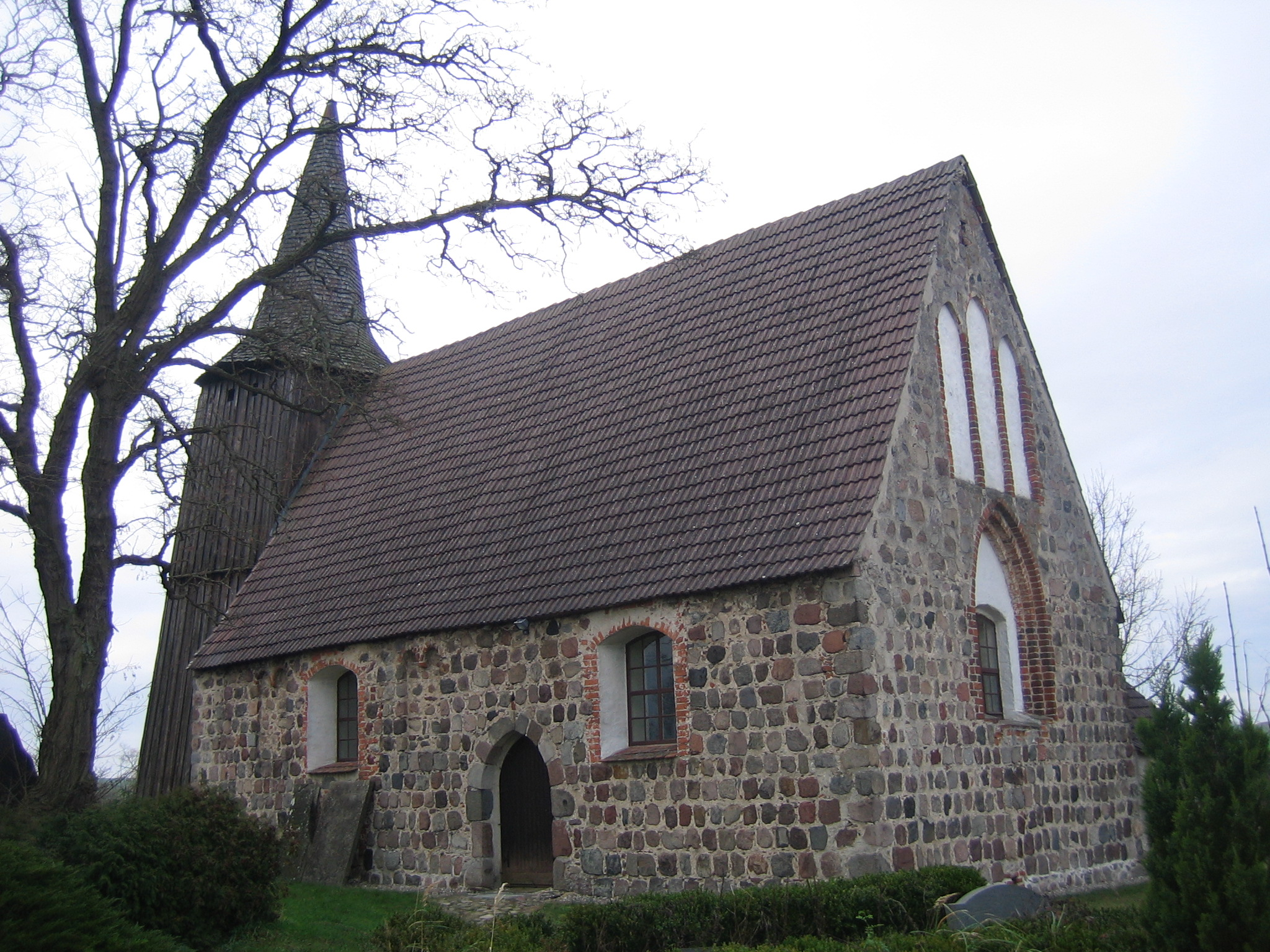
Cammin Village Church

Cammin (German pronunciation: [kaˈmiːn]) is a village and a former municipality in the Mecklenburgische Seenplatte district, in Mecklenburg-Vorpommern, Germany. Since 25 May 2014, it is part of the town Burg Stargard. It sits idyllically next to the Camminer See (Lake Cammin). The place name is of Slavic origin, derived from kameń "stone, rock", probably referring at that time to a prominent glacial erratic, of which there are many in the region.
