= List of nature reserves in Mecklenburg-Western Pomerania =

This sortable list contains all nature reserves in Mecklenburg-Western Pomerania, Germany (as of 31 December 2010). The serial numbers are those officially designated.

| Nature reserve (NSG) No. | Name of the nature reserve | County /Independent town | Area (hectares) | Image |
|---|---|---|---|---|
| N 1A | Peenemünder Haken, Struck and Ruden | Vorpommern-Greifswald | 7.544 | Nature Reserve Peenemünder Haken, Struck and Ruden |
| N 1B | Peenemünder Haken, Struck and Ruden Extension | Vorpommern-Greifswald | 268 | Nature Reserve Peenemünder Haken, Struck and Ruden |
| N 2 | Binsenbrink im Teterower See | Rostock | 74 | Nature Reserve Binsenbrink im Teterower See |
| N 3 | Vilm Island | Vorpommern-Rügen | 171 | View from the southern tip of Vilm Island |
| N 4 | Pulitz | Vorpommern-Rügen | 218 | Nature Reserve Pulitz |
| N 5 | Nonnenhof | Mecklenburgische Seenplatte | 1.049 | Nonnenhof Nature Reserve |
| N 6 | Island of Langenwerder | Nordwestmecklenburg | 58 | Lagenwerder |
| N 7 | Heilige Hallen | Mecklenburgische Seenplatte | 67 | |
| N 8 | Kieshofer Moor | Vorpommern-Greifswald | 30 | Kieshofer Moor Nature Reserve |
| N 9 | Mannhagener Moor | Vorpommern-Rügen | 45 | |
| N 10 | Hellgrund | Mecklenburgische Seenplatte | 20 | |
| N 11 | Stoltera | Stadt Rostock | 74 | Stoltera’s steep coast |
| N 12 | Conventer See | Rostock | 224 | Conventer See Nature Reserve |
| N 13 | Dierhäger Moor | Vorpommern-Rügen | 152 | |
| N 14 | Ribnitzer Großes Moor | Vorpommern-Rügen | 274 | Nature Reserve Ribnitzer Großes Moor |
| N 15 | Mönchsee | Mecklenburgische Seenplatte | 286 | |
| N 17 | Wallberge and Kreidescholle bei Alt Gatschow | Mecklenburgische Seenplatte | 21 | Wallberge and Kreidescholle bei Alt Gatschow Nature Reserve |
| N 18 | Krummenhagener See | Vorpommern-Rügen | 257 | Nature Reserve Krummenhagener See |
| N 19 | Döpe | Ludwigslust-Parchim, Nordwestmecklenburg | 214 | Döpe |
| N 20 | Beseritzer Torfwiesen | Mecklenburgische Seenplatte | 42 | |
| N 21 | Großes Moor bei Dänschenburg | Vorpommern-Rügen | 71 | Nature Reserve Großes Moor bei Dänschenburg |
| N 22 | Abtshagen | Vorpommern-Rügen | 250 | Nature Reserve Abtshagen |
| N 23 | Ahrenshooper Holz | Vorpommern-Rügen | 55 | Ahrenshooper Holz |
| N 24 | Brooker Wald | Nordwestmecklenburg | 51 | |
| N 26 | Eldena | Vorpommern-Greifswald | 420 | Eldena Nature Reserve |
| N 28 | Feldberger Hütte | Mecklenburgische Seenplatte | 480 | |
| N 29 | Friedrichsmoor | Ludwigslust-Parchim | 170 | Friedrichsmoor Nature Reserve |
| N 30 | Göldenitzer Moor | Rostock | 901 | Göldenitzer Moor Nature Reserve |
| N 31 | Großes Holz | Rostock | 20 | Großes Holz Nature Reserve |
| N 32 | Heiligensee and Hütelmoor | Stadt Rostock | 540 | Heiligensee and Hütelmoor Nature Reserve |
| N 33 | Mümmelkensee | Vorpommern-Greifswald | 6 | |
| N 34 | Hohe Burg and Schwarzer See | Rostock | 118 | Hohe Burg and Schwarzer See Nature Reserve |
| N 36 | Kalkhorst | Mecklenburgische Seenplatte | 78 | |
| N 37 | Nonnenbachtal | Mecklenburgische Seenplatte | 55 | Nonnenbachtal Nature Reserve |
| N 38 | Klepelshagen | Mecklenburgische Seenplatte, Vorpommern-Greifswald | 304 | Klepelshagen Nature Reserve |
| N 39 | Lanken | Vorpommern-Greifswald | 63 | Nature Reserve Lanken |
| N 40 | Jellen | Ludwigslust-Parchim | 24 | Jellen Nature Reserve |
| N 41 | Kläden | Ludwigslust-Parchim | 44 | Kläden Nature Reserve |
| N 42 | Kronwald | Vorpommern-Greifswald | 114 | |
| N 43A | Stone Fields in the Schmale Heath | Vorpommern-Rügen | 194 | Stone Fields in the Schmale Heath and Extension Nature Reserve |
| N 43B | Coastal Dunes Extension | Vorpommern-Rügen | 16 | Stone Fields in the Schmale Heath and Extension Nature Reserve |
| N 44 | Schnatermann | Stadt Rostock | 54 | Schnatermann Nature Reserve |
| N 45 | Sonnenberg | Ludwigslust-Parchim | 117 | Sonnenberg Nature Reserve |
| N 46 | Wittenhagen | Vorpommern-Rügen | 184 | Wittenhagen Nature Reserve |
| N 47 | Anklamer Stadtbruch | Vorpommern-Greifswald | 1.461 | Anklamer Stadtbruch Nature Reserve |
| N 48 | Blaues Wasser | Ludwigslust-Parchim | 10 | |
| N 49A | Galenbecker See | Mecklenburgische Seenplatte, Vorpommern-Greifswald | 1.031 | Galenbecker See |
| N 49B | Extension Galenbecker See | Mecklenburgische Seenplatte, Vorpommern-Greifswald | 863 | Galenbecker See |
| N 50 | Golm | Vorpommern-Greifswald | 23 | Golm |
| N 51 | Burgwall Rothemühl | Vorpommern-Greifswald | 45 | Burgwall Rothemühl Nature Reserve |
| N 52 | Gothensee and Thurbruch | Vorpommern-Greifswald | 808 | Gothensee |
| N 53 | Dambecker Seen | Nordwestmecklenburg | 195 | |
| N 54 | Großer Koblentzer See | Vorpommern-Greifswald | 269 | Großer Koblentzer See Nature Reserve |
| N 55 | Binnendünen bei Klein Schmölen | Ludwigslust-Parchim | 113 | Binnendünen bei Klein Schmölen Nature Reserve |
| N 56 | Bolzer See | Ludwigslust-Parchim | 112 | Bolzer See Nature Reserve |
| N 57 | Conower Werder | Mecklenburgische Seenplatte | 54 | Nature Reserve Conower Werder |
| N 58 | Damerower Werder | Mecklenburgische Seenplatte | 767 | Südwestufer des Jabelschen See vom Damerower Werder |
| N 59 | Fischteiche in der Lewitz | Ludwigslust-Parchim | 1.767 | Fischteiche in der Lewitz Nature Reserve |
| N 60 | Hauptmannsberg | Mecklenburgische Seenplatte | 44 | Nature Reserve Hauptmannsberg |
| N 61 | Hinrichshagen | Mecklenburgische Seenplatte | 996 | Hinrichshagen Nature Reserve |
| N 62 | Kormorankolonie bei Niederhof | Vorpommern-Rügen | 27 | Kormorankolonie bei Niederhof Nature Reserve |
| N 63 | Kuhlrader Moor and Röggeliner See | Nordwestmecklenburg | 307 | Kuhlrader Moor and Röggeliner See Nature Reserve |
| N 64 | Mittelsee bei Langwitz | Mecklenburgische Seenplatte | 16 | Mittelsee bei Langwitz Nature Reserve |
| N 66 | Teufelssee bei Thelkow | Rostock | 9 | Teufelssee bei Thelkow Nature Reserve |
| N 67 | Nordufer Plauer See | Ludwigslust-Parchim, Mecklenburgische Seenplatte | 647 | Nordwestliche Bucht des Plauen Sees |
| N 68 | Töpferberg | Ludwigslust-Parchim | 14 | |
| N 69A | Putzarer See | Mecklenburgische Seenplatte, Vorpommern-Greifswald | 399 | |
| N 69B | Putzarer See Extension | Mecklenburgische Seenplatte | 58 | |
| N 70 | Durchbruchstal der Warnow and Mildenitz | Ludwigslust-Parchim, Rostock | 71 | Durchbruchstal der Warnow and Mildenitz Nature Reserve |
| N 71 | Schanzberge bei Brietzig | Vorpommern-Greifswald | 7 | Schanzberge bei Brietzig Nature Reserve |
| N 72 | Sprockfitz | Mecklenburgische Seenplatte | 27 | |
| N 74 | Quaßliner Moor | Ludwigslust-Parchim | 59 | Quaßliner Moor Nature Reserve |
| N 75 | Hullerbusch and Schmaler Luzin | Mecklenburgische Seenplatte | 344 | Hullerbusch and Schmaler Luzin Nature Reserve |
| N 76 | Warnowseen | Ludwigslust-Parchim | 232 | |
| N 77 | Weißes Moor | Ludwigslust-Parchim | 13 | |
| N 78 | Wocknin-See | Vorpommern-Greifswald | 56 | Wockninsee |
| N 79 | Rosenholz and Zippelower Bachtal | Mecklenburgische Seenplatte | 211 | |
| N 80 | Grenztalmoor | Vorpommern-Rügen | 488 | |
| N 81 | Böhmke and Werder Islands | Vorpommern-Greifswald | 117 | |
| N 82 | Rustwerder | Nordwestmecklenburg | 31 | Nature Reserve Rustwerder |
| N 83 | Trebelmoor bei Tangrim | Vorpommern-Rügen | 57 | |
| N 84 | Dünenkiefernwald am Langhagensee | Ludwigslust-Parchim | 15 | |
| N 85 | Schönwolder Moor | Nordwestmecklenburg | 142 | |
| N 86 | Zehlendorfer Moor | Rostock | 90 | Nature Reserve Zehlendorfer Moor |
| N 87 | Barschmoor | Mecklenburgische Seenplatte | 33 | |
| N 88 | Birkbuschwiesen | Mecklenburgische Seenplatte | 136 | Nature Reserve Birkbuschwiesen |
| N 89 | Comthureyer Berg | Mecklenburgische Seenplatte | 13 | Nature Reserve Comthureyer Berg |
| N 90 | Großer Schwerin mit Steinhorst | Mecklenburgische Seenplatte | 415 | |
| N 91 | Grundloser See bei Ahrensberg | Mecklenburgische Seenplatte | 45 | |
| N 92 | Krüselinsee and Mechowseen | Mecklenburgische Seenplatte | 483 | Weutschsee |
| N 93 | Landgrabenwiesen bei Werder | Mecklenburgische Seenplatte | 95 | |
| N 95 | Rothes Moor bei Wesenberg | Mecklenburgische Seenplatte | 84 | |
| N 96 | Rühlower Os | Mecklenburgische Seenplatte | 24 | |
| N 97 | Zahrensee bei Dabelow | Mecklenburgische Seenplatte | 17 | |
| N 98 | Zerrinsee bei Qualzow | Mecklenburgische Seenplatte | 34 | |
| N 99 | Hellberge | Mecklenburgische Seenplatte | 47 | Hellberge Nature Reserve |
| N 100 | Torfstiche Stuer | Mecklenburgische Seenplatte | 56 | |
| N 101 | Eichhorst im Schönbecker Wald | Mecklenburgische Seenplatte | 228 | |
| N 103 | Unteres Peenetal (Peenetalmoor) | Vorpommern-Greifswald | 1.198 | |
| N 104 | Stauchmoräne nördlich Remplin | Mecklenburgische Seenplatte | 146 | Stauchmoräne nördlich Remplin Nature Reserve |
| N 105 | Breeser See | Rostock | 162 | Breeser See |
| N 106 | Bretziner Heide | Ludwigslust-Parchim | 31 | Nature Reserve Bretziner Heide |
| N 107 | Das Alte Moor bei Drispeth | Nordwestmecklenburg | 12 | |
| N 108 | Görslower Ufer | Ludwigslust-Parchim | 50 | Görslower Ufer Nature Reserve |
| N 109 | Grambower Moor | Ludwigslust-Parchim, Nordwestmecklenburg | 571 | Grambower Moor Nature Reserve |
| N 110 | Großes Moor bei Darze | Ludwigslust-Parchim | 193 | |
| N 111 | Kaninchenwerder and Großer Stein im Großen Schweriner See | City of Schwerin | 88 | |
| N 112 | Klinker Plage | Ludwigslust-Parchim | 38 | |
| N 113 | Schaalelauf | Ludwigslust-Parchim | 542 | Schaale in einem Wald bei Kogel |
| N 114 | Schlichtes Moor | Rostock | 58 | |
| N 115 | Nieklitzer Moor | Ludwigslust-Parchim | 67 | |
| N 116 | Upahler and Lenzener See | Ludwigslust-Parchim, Rostock | 537 | |
| N 117 | Peetscher See | Rostock | 204 | Hullergraben im Naturschutzgebiet Peetscher See |
| N 118 | Rothenmoorsche Sumpfwiese | Nordwestmecklenburg | 13 | Rothenmoorsche Sumpfwiese Nature Reserve |
| N 119 | Krakower Obersee | Rostock | 1.179 | Krakower Obersee Nature Reserve |
| N 120 | Paschensee | Ludwigslust-Parchim | 228 | |
| N 121 | Ramper Moor | Ludwigslust-Parchim, Nordwestmecklenburg | 164 | |
| N 122 | Sabelsee | Ludwigslust-Parchim | 35 | |
| N 123 | Warnowtal bei Karnin | Ludwigslust-Parchim | 150 | |
| N 124 | Gägelower See | Ludwigslust-Parchim | 40 | |
| N 125 | Entenmoor Moitin | Rostock | 31 | |
| N 126 | Fauler See–Rustwerder/Poel | Nordwestmecklenburg | 137 | Fauler See Nature Reserve |
| N 127 | Karlsburger and Oldenburger Holz | Vorpommern-Greifswald | 399 | |
| N 128 | Schoritzer Wiek | Vorpommern-Rügen | 463 | Schoritzer Wiek Nature Reserve |
| N 129 | Torfstichgelände bei Carlewitz | Vorpommern-Rügen | 103 | |
| N 130 | Vogelhaken Glewitz | Vorpommern-Rügen | 89 | Vogelhaken Glewitz Nature Reserve |
| N 134 | Kiesbergwiesen bei Bergholz | Vorpommern-Greifswald | 54 | |
| N 135A | Ostpeene | Mecklenburgische Seenplatte | 97 | Ostpeene Nature Reserve |
| N 135B | Extension Ostpeene | Mecklenburgische Seenplatte | 47 | Ostpeene Nature Reserve |
| N 136 | Wildes Moor bei Borken | Vorpommern-Greifswald | 228 | |
| N 137 | Nebel | Rostock | 841 | Nebel Nature Reserve |
| N 138 | Blüchersches Bruch and Mittelplan | Mecklenburgische Seenplatte | 187 | |
| N 139 | Ostufer Tiefwaren – Falkenhäger Bruch | Mecklenburgische Seenplatte | 113 | Ostufer Tiefwaren – Falkenhäger Bruch Nature Reserve |
| N 140 | Island of Walfisch | Nordwestmecklenburg | 72 | |
| N 141 | Wustrow | Rostock | 1.999 | |
| N 143 | Dassower See Shore Zone | Nordwestmecklenburg | 148 | Dassower See Shore Zone Nature Reserve |
| N 144 | Küstenlandschaft zwischen Priwall and Barendorf mit Harkenbäkniederung | Nordwestmecklenburg | 542 | Rosenhagen Steep Coast |
| N 145 | Wakenitzniederung | Nordwestmecklenburg | 291 | Wakenitz |
| N 146 | Teichgebiet Wismar-Kluß | Nordwestmecklenburg | 180 | |
| N 148 | Bollenberg bei Gothmann | Ludwigslust-Parchim | 47 | Bollenberg bei Gothmann Nature Reserve |
| N 149 | Campower Steilufer | Nordwestmecklenburg | 13 | |
| N 150 | Der Ewige Teich | Nordwestmecklenburg | 21 | |
| N 151 | Elbdeichvorland | Ludwigslust-Parchim | 143 | |
| N 152 | Elbhang "Vierwald" | Ludwigslust-Parchim | 158 | Elbhang "Vierwald" Nature Reserve |
| N 155 | Goldensee | Nordwestmecklenburg | 174 | |
| N 157 | Kammerbruch | Nordwestmecklenburg | 148 | |
| N 158 | Kiekbuschwiesen bei Neuhof | Nordwestmecklenburg | 51 | |
| N 159 | Krainke von Quelle bis Mündung in die Sude | Ludwigslust-Parchim | 21 | |
| N 160 | Lankower See | Nordwestmecklenburg | 130 | Lankower See Nature Reserve |
| N 164 | Mechower See | Nordwestmecklenburg | 185 | |
| N 165 | Sudeniederung zwischen Boizenburg and Besitz | Ludwigslust-Parchim | 1.009 | |
| N 167 | Rögnitzwiesen bei Neu Lübtheen | Ludwigslust-Parchim | 206 | |
| N 168 | Techin | Ludwigslust-Parchim | 622 | |
| N 169 | Schaaleniederung von Zahrendorf bis Blücher | Ludwigslust-Parchim | 157 | Schaale in Blücher |
| N 170 | Strangen | Ludwigslust-Parchim | 78 | Nature Reserve Strangen |
| N 172 | Rüterberg | Ludwigslust-Parchim | 418 | |
| N 174 | Togerwiesen bei Garlitz | Ludwigslust-Parchim | 37 | Nature Reserve Togerwiesen bei Garlitz |
| N 177 | Löcknitztal-Altlauf | Ludwigslust-Parchim | 235 | Nature Reserve Löcknitztal-Altlauf |
| N 178 | Niendorf–Bernstorfer Binnensee | Ludwigslust-Parchim, Nordwestmecklenburg | 582 | |
| N 179 | Moorer Busch | Nordwestmecklenburg | 111 | |
| N 180 | Ahlbecker Seegrund | Vorpommern-Greifswald | 1.278 | Ahlbecker Seegrund |
| N 181 | Griever Holz | Rostock | 186 | |
| N 182 | Gruber Forst | Rostock | 376 | Nature Reserve Gruber Forst |
| N 183 | Dammer Postmoor | Rostock | 245 | |
| N 184 | Teterower Heidberge | Rostock | 198 | Nature Reserve Teterower Heidberge |
| N 185 | Trebeltal | Rostock | 843 | Warbel bei Wasdow |
| N 186 | Altwarper Binnendünen, Neuwarper See and Riether Werder | Vorpommern-Greifswald | 1.431 | Altwarper Binnendünen Nature Reserve |
| N 187a | Goor-Muglitz: Muglitzer Boddenufer | Vorpommern-Rügen | 13 | |
| N 187b | Goor-Muglitz: Freetzer Niederung and Goor | Vorpommern-Rügen | 129 | |
| N 188 | Granitz | Vorpommern-Rügen | 1.161 | Nature Reserve Granitz |
| N 189a | Mönchgut: Südperd | Vorpommern-Rügen | 27 | Nature Reserve Mönchgut |
| N 189b | Mönchgut: Zicker | Vorpommern-Rügen | 932 | Zicker |
| N 189c | Mönchgut: Lobber Ort | Vorpommern-Rügen | 9 | Lobber Ort |
| N 189d | Mönchgut: Salzwiesen bei Middelhagen | Vorpommern-Rügen | 71 | |
| N 189e | Mönchgut: Schafberg bei Mariendorf | Vorpommern-Rügen | 19 | |
| N 189f | Mönchgut: Nordperd | Vorpommern-Rügen | 69 | Nordperd |
| N 189g | Mönchgut: Göhrener Litorinakliff and Baaber Heide | Vorpommern-Rügen | 158 | Schild am Eingangsbereich zur Baaber Heide |
| N 189h | Mönchgut: Having and Reddevitzer Höft | Vorpommern-Rügen | 1.032 | Reddevitzer Höft |
| N 190a | Neuensiener and Selliner See: Westufer des Selliner Sees | Vorpommern-Rügen | 87 | Baaber Beek am Selliner See |
| N 190b | Neuensiener and Selliner See: Neuensiener See | Vorpommern-Rügen | 122 | Neuensiener See |
| N 190c | Neuensiener and Selliner See: Hügel bei Neuensien | Vorpommern-Rügen | 4 | |
| N 191 | Quellsumpf Ziegensteine bei Groß Stresow | Vorpommern-Rügen | 4 | Nature Reserve Quellsumpf Ziegensteine bei Groß Stresow |
| N 192 | Wreechener See | Vorpommern-Rügen | 72 | Wreechener See |
| N 193 | Gorinsee | Vorpommern-Greifswald | 249 | |
| N 194 | Gottesheide mit Schloßsee and Lenzener See | Vorpommern-Greifswald | 1.403 | Schloßsee |
| N 195 | Brantensee | Ludwigslust-Parchim | 90 | |
| N 196 | Drewitzer See mit Lübowsee and Dreiersee | Mecklenburgische Seenplatte | 1.467 | Drewitzer See |
| N 197 | Großer and Kleiner Serrahn | Ludwigslust-Parchim | 715 | |
| N 198 | Gültzsee | Rostock | 192 | |
| N 199 | Nordufer Langhagensee and Kleiner Langhagensee | Ludwigslust-Parchim | 34 | |
| N 200 | Seen- and Bruchlandschaft südlich Alt Gaarz | Mecklenburgische Seenplatte | 773 | |
| N 201 | Darschkower See bei Stolzenburg | Vorpommern-Greifswald | 25 | |
| N 202 | Grünzer Berge | Vorpommern-Greifswald | 30 | |
| N 203 | Waldhof | Vorpommern-Greifswald | 254 | |
| N 205 | Freienholz | Rostock | 59 | |
| N 207 | Stegendieksbach | Rostock | 63 | |
| N 209 | Groß Potremser Moor | Rostock | 186 | |
| N 210 | Unteres Recknitztal | Vorpommern-Rügen | 1.420 | Unteres Recknitztal Nature Reserve |
| N 211 | Recknitzwiesen | Rostock | 554 | |
| N 213 | Reppeliner Bachtal | Rostock | 77 | Reppeliner Bachtal Nature Reserve |
| N 214 | Maibachtal | Rostock, Vorpommern-Rügen | 90 | Maibachtal Nature Reserve |
| N 215 | Ehmkendorfer Moor | Rostock | 38 | |
| N 216 | Gramstorfer Berge | Rostock | 47 | Nature Reserve Gramstorfer Berge |
| N 222 | Teufelsmoor bei Horst | Rostock | 305 | Nature Reserve Teufelsmoor bei Horst |
| N 224 | Unteres Warnowland | Rostock, Stadt Rostock | 1.125 | Nature Reserve Unteres Warnowland |
| N 226 | Kösterbeck | Rostock | 231 | Kösterbeck |
| N 227 | Ahrenshäger See | Rostock | 41 | Ahrenshäger See Nature Reserve |
| N 228 | Alte Elde bei Kuppentin | Ludwigslust-Parchim | 325 | Alte Elde bei Kuppentin Nature Reserve |
| N 229 | Daschower Moor | Ludwigslust-Parchim | 95 | |
| N 230 | Kiesgrube Wüstmark | Stadt Schwerin | 17 | Kiesgrube Wüstmark Nature Reserve |
| N 231 | Krummes Moor | Ludwigslust-Parchim | 14 | |
| N 232 | Langenhägener Seewiesen | Ludwigslust-Parchim | 146 | Langenhägener Seewiesen |
| N 233 | Pipermoor/Mühlbachtal | Ludwigslust-Parchim | 13 | |
| N 234 | Rugenseemoor | Rostock | 10 | |
| N 235 | Stecknitz–Delvenau | Ludwigslust-Parchim | 261 | Nature Reserve Stecknitz-Delvenau |
| N 236 | Wallmoor | Ludwigslust-Parchim | 29 | |
| N 237 | Ziegelwerder | Stadt Schwerin | 64 | |
| N 239 | Gehlsbachtal | Ludwigslust-Parchim | 252 | Gehlsbach |
| N 241 | Schwingetal and Peenewiesen bei Trantow | Vorpommern-Greifswald | 703 | |
| N 242 | Selmsdorfer Traveufer | Nordwestmecklenburg | 123 | |
| N 243 | Radelsee | Stadt Rostock | 218 | |
| N 244 | Buddenhagener Moor | Vorpommern-Greifswald | 113 | Buddenhagener Moor Nature Reserve |
| N 245 | Greifswalder Oie | Vorpommern-Greifswald | 215 | Greifswalder Ole |
| N 246 | Großer Wotig | Vorpommern-Greifswald | 212 | Großer Wotig Nature Reserve |
| N 247 | Cosim Peninsula | Vorpommern-Greifswald | 102 | Cosim Peninsula Nature Reserve |
| N 248 | Südspitze Gnitz | Vorpommern-Greifswald | 75 | Südspitze Gnitz |
| N 249 | Fahrenbrink Peninsula | Vorpommern-Greifswald | 36 | |
| N 250 | Koos Island, Kooser See and Wampener Riff | Vorpommern-Greifswald | 1.566 | Koos Island Nature Reserve |
| N 252 | Kniepower See and Katharinensee | Vorpommern-Rügen | 31 | |
| N 253 | Langes Moor | Vorpommern-Rügen | 89 | |
| N 254 | Tetzitzer See with Liddow Peninsula and Banzelvitzer Berge | Vorpommern-Rügen | 1.112 | |
| N 255 | Roter See bei Glowe | Vorpommern-Rügen | 219 | |
| N 256 | Spyckerscher See and Mittelsee | Vorpommern-Rügen | 354 | |
| N 257 | Nordufer Wittow mit Hohen Dielen | Vorpommern-Rügen | 139 | Nordufer Wittow mit Hohen Dielen Nature Reserve |
| N 259 | Stepenitz- and Maurine-Niederung | Nordwestmecklenburg | 516 | |
| N 260 | Streckelsberg | Vorpommern-Greifswald | 36 | Streckelsberg |
| N 261 | Gutower Moor and Schöninsel | Rostock | 365 | Gutower Moor and Schöninsel Nature Reserve |
| N 262 | Cossensee | Rostock | 137 | |
| N 263 | Trockenhänge am Petersberg | Ludwigslust-Parchim | 46 | |
| N 264 | Mirower Holm | Mecklenburgische Seenplatte | 58 | |
| N 265 | Müritzsteilufer bei Rechlin | Mecklenburgische Seenplatte | 292 | |
| N 266 | Klein Vielener See | Mecklenburgische Seenplatte | 164 | |
| N 268 | Schlavenkensee | Mecklenburgische Seenplatte | 593 | Nature Reserve Schlavenkensee |
| N 269 | Santower See | Nordwestmecklenburg | 251 | |
| N 271 | Riedensee | Rostock | 102 | Riedensee |
| N 273 | Devin Peninsula | Vorpommern-Rügen | 106 | Devin Peninsula Nature Reserve |
| N 274 | Lauenhagener See | Mecklenburgische Seenplatte, Vorpommern-Greifswald | 103 | Lauenhagener See Nature Reserve |
| N 275 | Tarnewitzer Huk | Nordwestmecklenburg | 67 | Tarnewitzer Huk Nature Reserve |
| N 276 | Försterhofer Heide | Vorpommern-Rügen | 83 | Försterhofer Heide Nature Reserve |
| N 277 | Trollblumenwiese Neukloster | Nordwestmecklenburg | 19 | |
| N 278 | Binnensalzwiese bei Sülten | Ludwigslust-Parchim | 14 | Binnensalzwiese bei Sülten Nature Reserve |
| N 279 | Marienfließ | Ludwigslust-Parchim | 617 | Marienfließ Nature Reserve |
| N 280 | Kalkflachmoor and Tongruben bei Degtow | Nordwestmecklenburg | 60 | |
| N 281 | Wüste and Glase | Mecklenburgische Seenplatte, Rostock | 339 | |
| N 282 | Wumm- and Twernsee | Mecklenburgische Seenplatte | 136 | |
| N 283 | Kalk-Zwischenmoor Wendischhagen | Mecklenburgische Seenplatte | 52 | Kalk-Zwischenmoor Wendischhagen Nature Reserve |
| N 284 | Nordufer Plätlinsee | Mecklenburgische Seenplatte | 306 | Plätlinsee |
| N 285 | Wostevitzer Teiche | Vorpommern-Rügen | 319 | Nature Reserve Wostevitzer Teiche |
| N 286 | Nordwestufer Wittow and Kreptitzer Heide | Vorpommern-Rügen | 101 | |
| N 287 | Kulowseen | Mecklenburgische Seenplatte | 201 | Kleiner Kulowsee |
| N 288 | Keetzseen | Mecklenburgische Seenplatte | 327 | |
| N 289 | Sandugkensee | Mecklenburgische Seenplatte | 67 | |
| N 290 | Bockhorst | Rostock | 64 | Bockhorst Nature Reserve |
| N 291 | Ziemenbachtal | Mecklenburgische Seenplatte | 180 | Ziemenbachtal Nature Reserve |
| N 292 | Schmachter See and Fangerien | Vorpommern-Rügen | 279 | Schmachter See and Fangerien Nature Reserve |
| N 293 | Wangeliner See | Ludwigslust-Parchim | 127 | |
| N 294 | Dornbusch and Schwedenhagener Ufer | Vorpommern-Rügen | 10 | |
| N 295 | Dünenheide auf der Island Hiddensee | Vorpommern-Rügen | 67 | |
| N 296 | Kuckssee and Lapitzer See | Mecklenburgische Seenplatte | 108 | |
| N 297 | Luisenhofer Teiche | Mecklenburgische Seenplatte | 27 | |
| N 298 | Wüstemoor am Blanksee | Ludwigslust-Parchim | 87 | |
| N 300 | Zerninsee-Senke | Vorpommern-Greifswald | 383 | Zerninsee-Senke |
| N 301 | Mellenthiner Os | Vorpommern-Greifswald | 65 | |
| N 302 | Beketal | Rostock | 112 | |
| N 303 | Plöwensches Seebruch | Vorpommern-Greifswald | 228 | Nature Reserve Plöwensches Seebruch |
| N 304 | Plauer Stadtwald | Ludwigslust-Parchim | 299 | |
| N 305 | Kleiner Krebssee | Vorpommern-Greifswald | 46 | |
| N 306 | Klädener Plage and Mildenitz-Durchbruchstal | Ludwigslust-Parchim | 118 | Nature Reserve Klädener Plage and Mildenitz-Durchbruchstal |
| N 307 | Obere Nebelseen | Mecklenburgische Seenplatte | 499 | |
| N 308 | Radegasttal | Nordwestmecklenburg | 346 | Radegasttal Nature Reserve |
| N 310 | Feuchtgebiet Waidmannslust | Mecklenburgische Seenplatte | 174 | |
| N 311 | Borgwallsee and Pütter See | Vorpommern-Rügen | 566 | Pütter See |
| N 312 | Ladebower Moor | Vorpommern-Greifswald | 131 | |
| N 313 | Drispether Moor | Nordwestmecklenburg | 69 | Das Alte Moor bei Drispeth Nature Reserve |
| N 315 | Schanzenberge bei Mankmoos | Nordwestmecklenburg | 11 | Nature Reserve Schanzenberge bei Mankmoos |
| N 316 | Lake Boissow and Lake Neuenkirchen South Nature Reserve | Ludwigslust-Parchim | 73 | Lake Boissow |
| N 317 | Weißes and Schwarzes Moor | Nordwestmecklenburg | 123 | |
| N 318 | Brooksee | Rostock | 26 | Brooksee |
| N 319 | Hütter Klosterteiche | Rostock | 57 | Hütter Klosterteiche Nature Reserve |
| N 320 | Moorrinne von Klein Salitz bis zum Neuenkirchener See | Ludwigslust-Parchim, Nordwestmecklenburg | 859 | |
| N 321 | Neuendorfer Wiek mit Island Beuchel | Vorpommern-Rügen | 538 | Neuendorfer Wiek Nature Reserve |
| N 322 | Trockenhänge bei Jülchendorf and Schönlager See | Ludwigslust-Parchim | 102 | |
| N 323 | Island of Görmitz | Vorpommern-Greifswald | 137 | Görmitz Island |
| N 324 | Neuendorfer Moor | Nordwestmecklenburg | 169 | Neuendorfer Moor Nature Reserve |
| N 326 | Pohnstorfer Moor | Nordwestmecklenburg | 33 | |
| N 327 | Peenetal von Salem bis Jarmen | Mecklenburgische Seenplatte, Vorpommern-Greifswald | 6.716 | Peenetal von Salem bis Jarmen Nature Reserve |
| N 328 | Peenetal von Jarmen bis Anklam | Vorpommern-Greifswald | 3.414 | |

== Literature ==
- Umweltministerium Mecklenburg-Vorpommern (Hrsg.): Die nature reserves in Mecklenburg-Vorpommern. Demmler-Verlag, Schwerin 2003, ISBN 3-910150-52-7
