= Feldberg Lake District Nature Park =

Nature park in Mecklenburg-Vorpommern, Germany

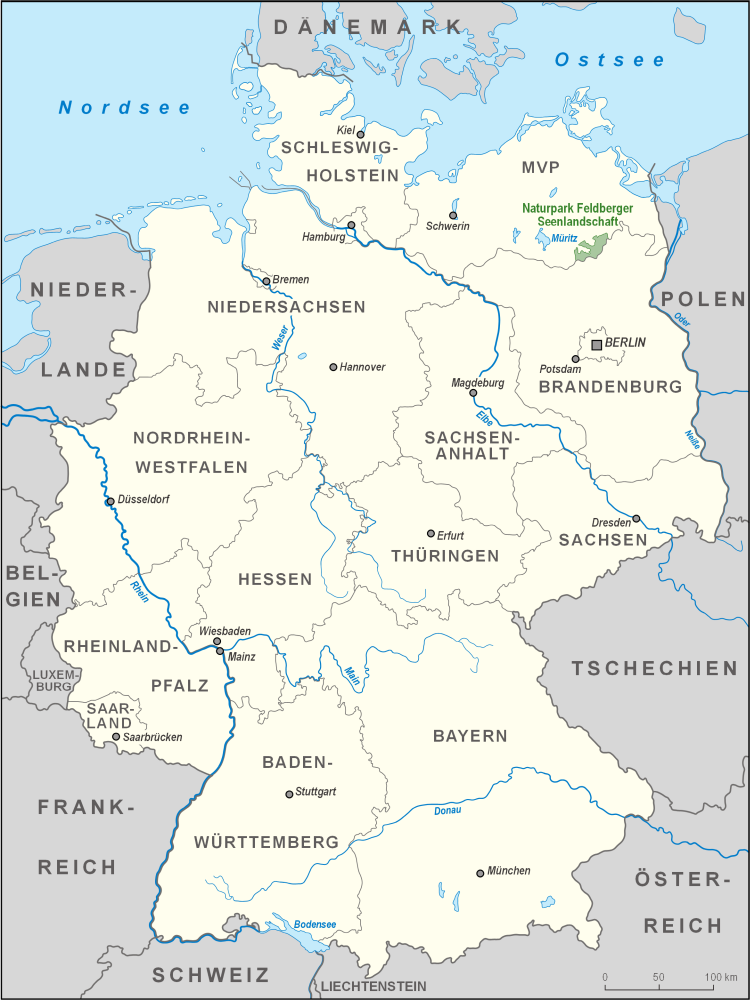
Location

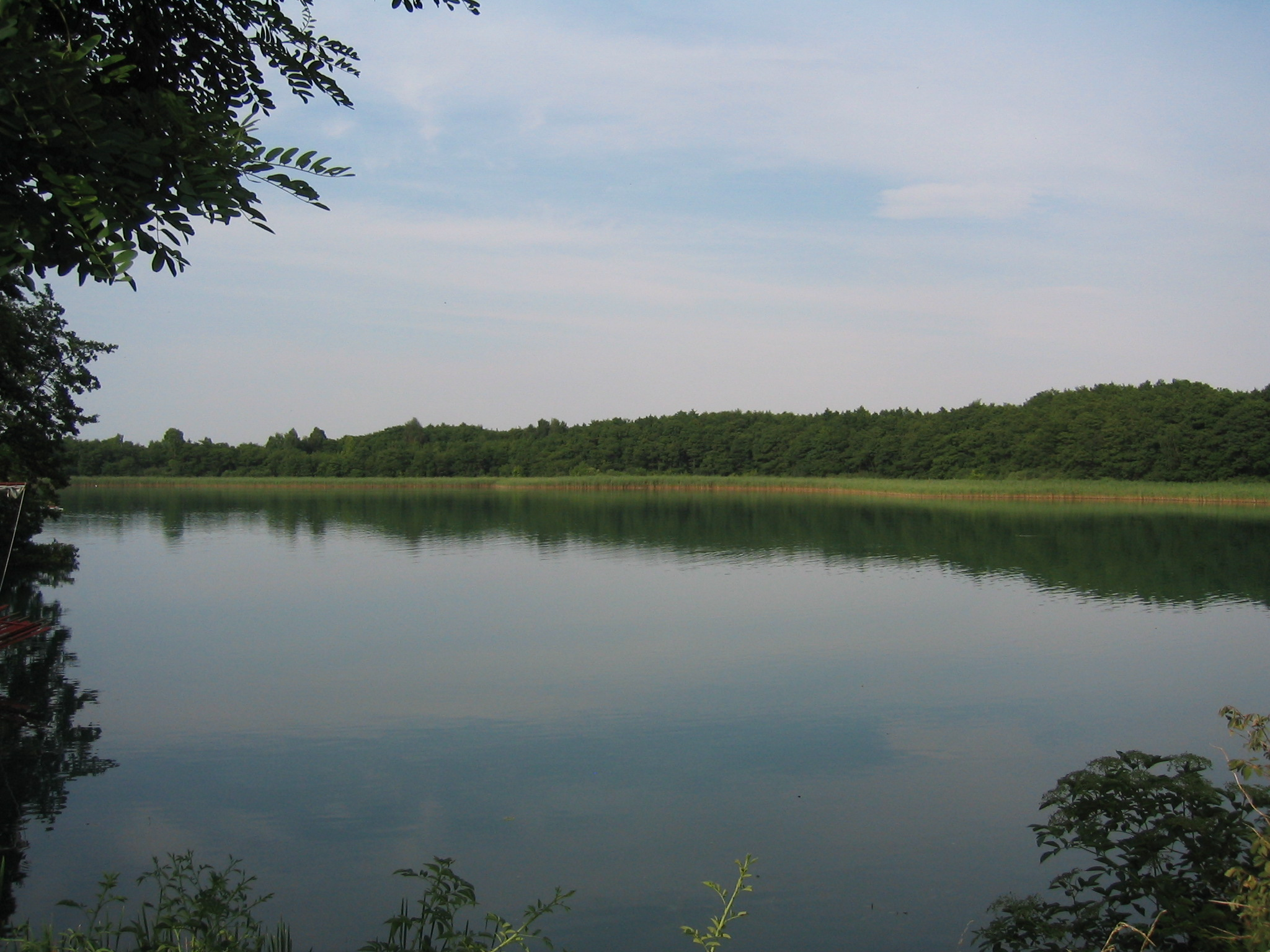
The Breite Luzin in the nature park

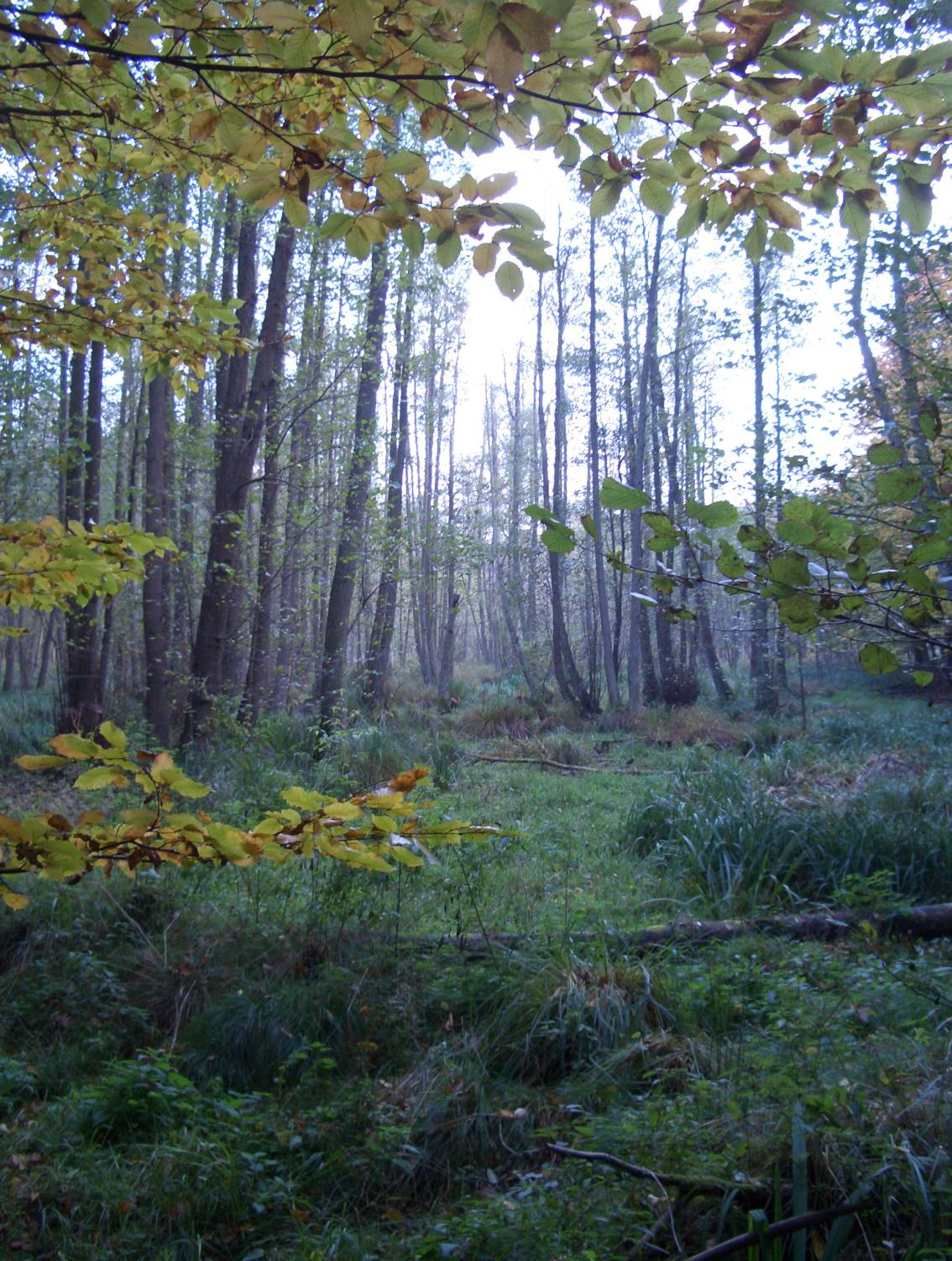
Alder carr in one of the numerous wet areas

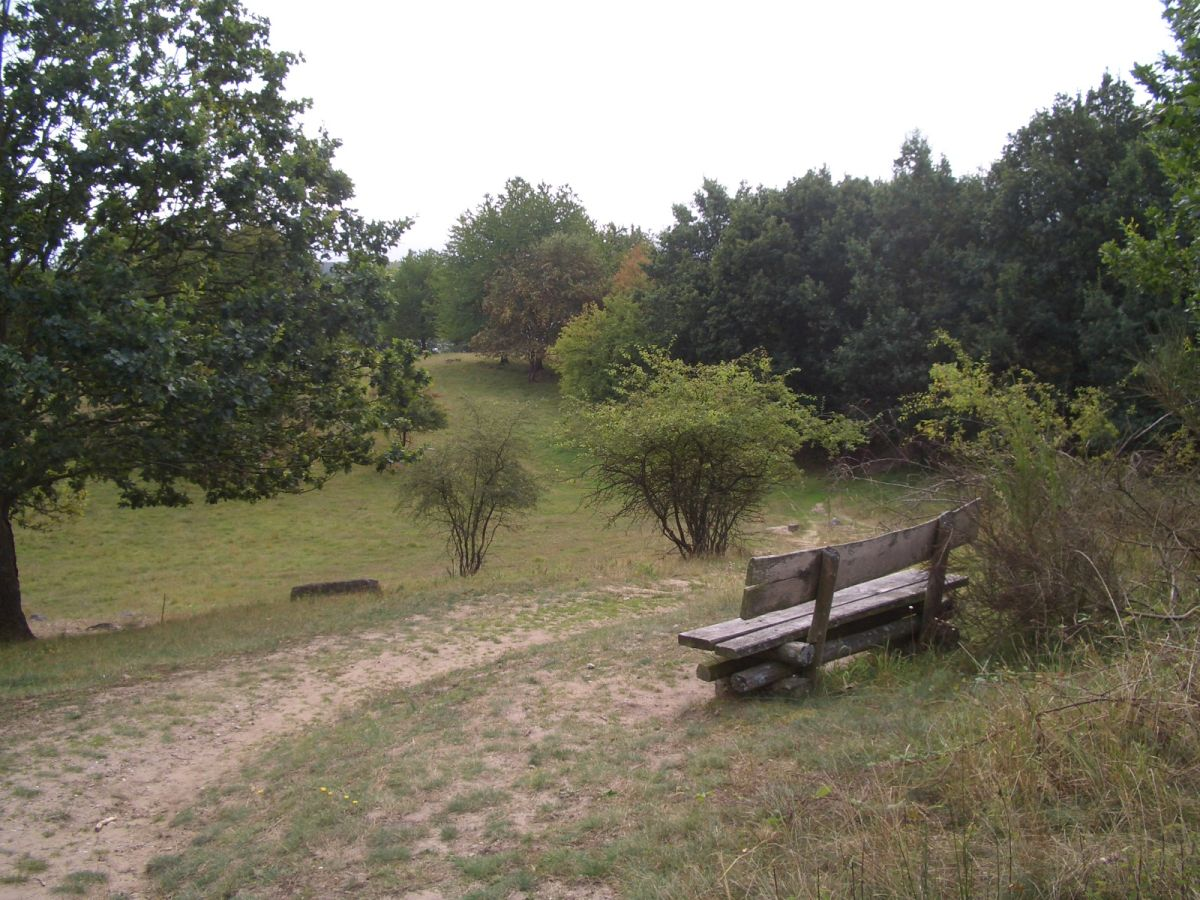
Dry biotope and footpath with numerous viewing points

The Feldberg Lake District Nature Park (German: Naturpark Feldberger Seenlandschaft, pronounced [naˈtuːɐ̯paʁk ˈfɛltˌbɛʁɡɐ ˈzeːnˌlantʃaft]) lies in the southeast of the German state of Mecklenburg-Vorpommern in the district of Mecklenburgische Seenplatte. A large part of the nature park lies within the municipality of the same name, the Feldberger Seenlandschaft ("Feldberg Lake District"). In addition the municipalities of Wokuhl-Dabelow, Grünow, Carpin, Godendorf and parts of the towns of Woldegk and Neustrelitz fall within the nature park. The western end of the park is also a part of Müritz National Park.

The Feldberg Lake District Nature Park is characterised by its large lakes, the (Breiter Luzin, the Carwitzer See, the Schmaler Luzin, the Großer Fürstenseer See and Feldberger Haussee), the forests with their many plants and animals, including rare species, and also by its cultural landscape. Features of the park are its kettle bogs and the oldest beech woods in Germany in the nature reserve of Heilige Hallen.

The landscape was shaped by the ice age. In the north of the park there is a region of terminal moraines; in the south is wooded sandur terrain. The central area with the Feldberg lakes is part of the terminal moraine of the Pomeranian Stage of the Weichselian glaciation. Here the topographic height differences are greater than is normal for North Germany. The highest hill is the Vogelkirsche (German: [ˈfoːɡl̩ˌkɪʁʃə]; near the village of Schlicht north of the Breiter Luzin) with a height of 166.2 metres above sea level (NHN). The Breiter Luzin is the second deepest lake in Mecklenburg-Vorpommern, with a depth of up to 58.3 metres.

The state border with Brandenburg runs through the lakes of Krüselinsee and Großer Mechowsee and the southern part of the Carwitzer See.

Many rare animals live here, such as the otter, which is the heraldic animal of the park, the black stork, the lesser spotted eagle, osprey and white-tailed eagle, the swollen river mussel and the whitefish. There are over 1,000 wild flower species in this nature park.

The park has an area of c. 340 km^{2}, of which c. 38% is woodland, c. 11% is lakes and rivers, c. 45% is used for agriculture and c. 6% by infrastructure and housing.

== Nature reserves ==
There are 14 nature reserves in the park, covering a total area of 3,714 hectares, which is 10.3 percent of the nature park’s area:

- Comthureyer Berg (13 ha)
- Conower Werder (54 ha)
- Feldberger Hütte (481 ha)
- Hauptmannsberg (44 ha)
- Heilige Hallen (68 ha)
- Hinrichshagen (1124 ha)
- Hullerbusch und Schmaler Luzin (345 ha)
- Keetzseen (329 ha)
- Krüselinsee und Mechowseen (481 ha)
- Kulowseen (199 ha)
- Sandugkensee (67 ha)
- Schlavenkensee (593 ha)
- Sprockfitz (27 ha)
- Zahrensee bei Dabelow (17 ha)

== See also ==
- List of nature parks in Germany

== Literature ==
- Peter Wernicke et al.: Zwischen Havel und Strom. Die Naturparks Feldberger Seenlandschaft und Uckermärkische Seen. Herausgegeben vom Förderverein Feldberg-Uckermärkische Seenlandschaft. Thomas-Verlag, Leipzig 1998, 97 S., ISBN 3-86174-050-8
- Klaus Borrmann: Lüttenhäger Oberförster. Leben und Wirken für die Wälder der Feldberger Seenlandschaft 1810 - 2001. Waldmuseum Lütt Holthus, Lüttenhagen 2001, 134 S.
