= Feldberger Seenlandschaft =

- Municipality
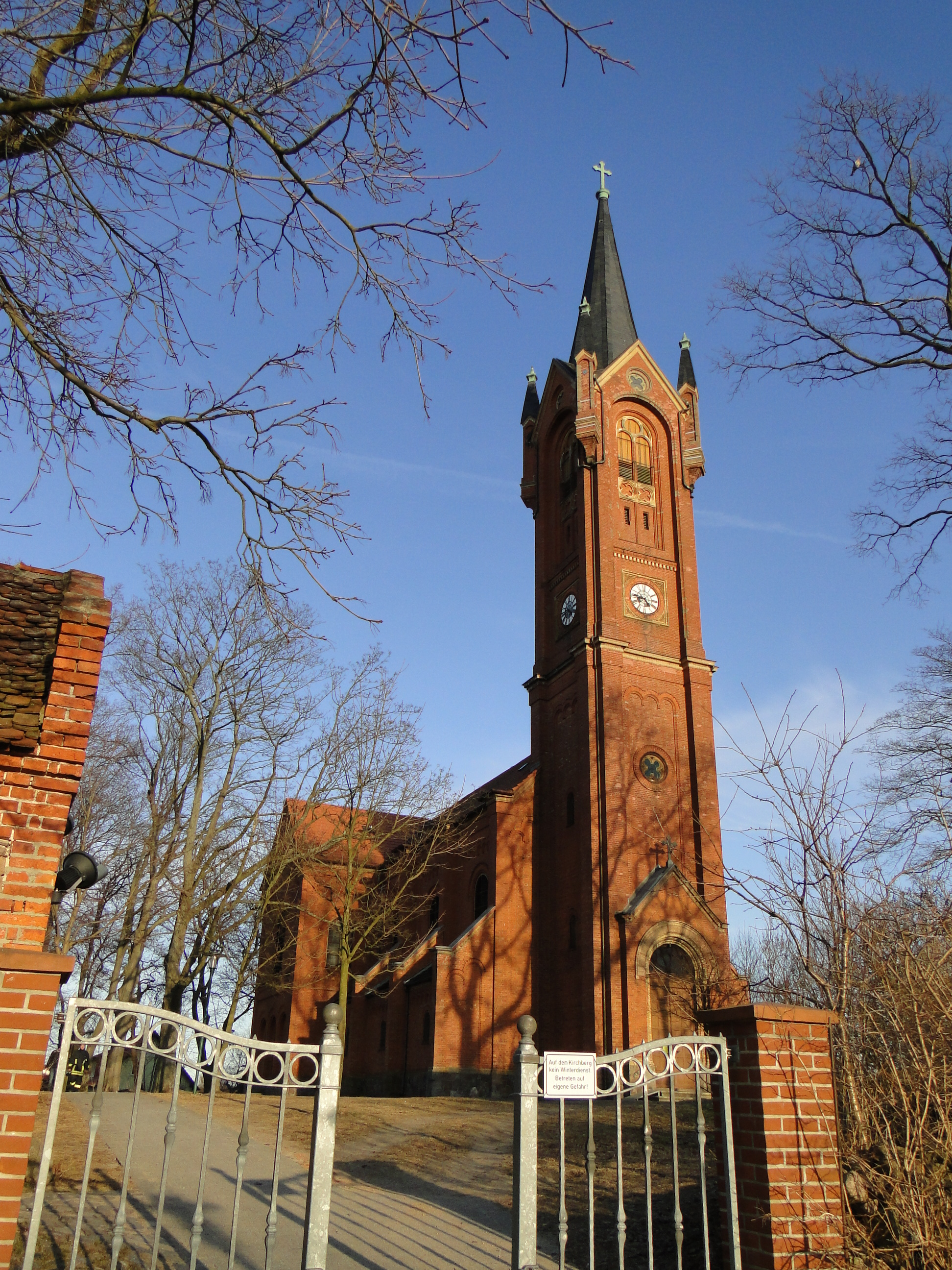
- Church in Feldberg

- Location of Feldberger Seenlandschaft within Mecklenburgische Seenplatte district
- Interactive map of Feldberger Seenlandschaft
- Location within Germany Location within Mecklenburg-Vorpommern
- Coordinates: 53°19′N 13°26′E
- Country: Germany
- State: Mecklenburg-Vorpommern
- District: Mecklenburgische Seenplatte

Government
  - Mayor: Constance von Buchwaldt

Area
  - Total: 199.57 km^{2} (77.05 sq mi)
- Elevation: 100 m (330 ft)

Population (2025-12-31)
  - Total: 4,298
  - Density: 21.54/km^{2} (55.78/sq mi)
- Time zone: UTC+01:00 (CET)
  - Summer (DST): UTC+02:00 (CEST)
- Postal codes: 17258
- Dialling codes: 03964, 039820, 039831, 039882
- Vehicle registration: MST
- Website: gemeinde.feldberger-seenlandschaft.de

Feldberger Seenlandschaft ("Feldberg Lake District") is a municipality in the district of Mecklenburgische Seenplatte, in Mecklenburg-Vorpommern, in north-eastern Germany.

It is situated in the southeast of the district. The municipality is named after the Mecklenburg Lake District in the surrounding area with the lakes of Carwitzer See, Feldberger Haussee, Breiter Luzin and Schmaler Luzin.

== History ==
During the final stages of World War II, on 10 February 1945, Lichtenberg (now part of the municipality) was the site of a stopover during the German-organised march of some 2,700 French prisoners of war from the Oflag II-B camp headed westwards.

In the immediate aftermath of the Second World War, the writer, Hans Fallada, who at the time was living in Feldberg, was appointed the town's interim mayor for 18 months.

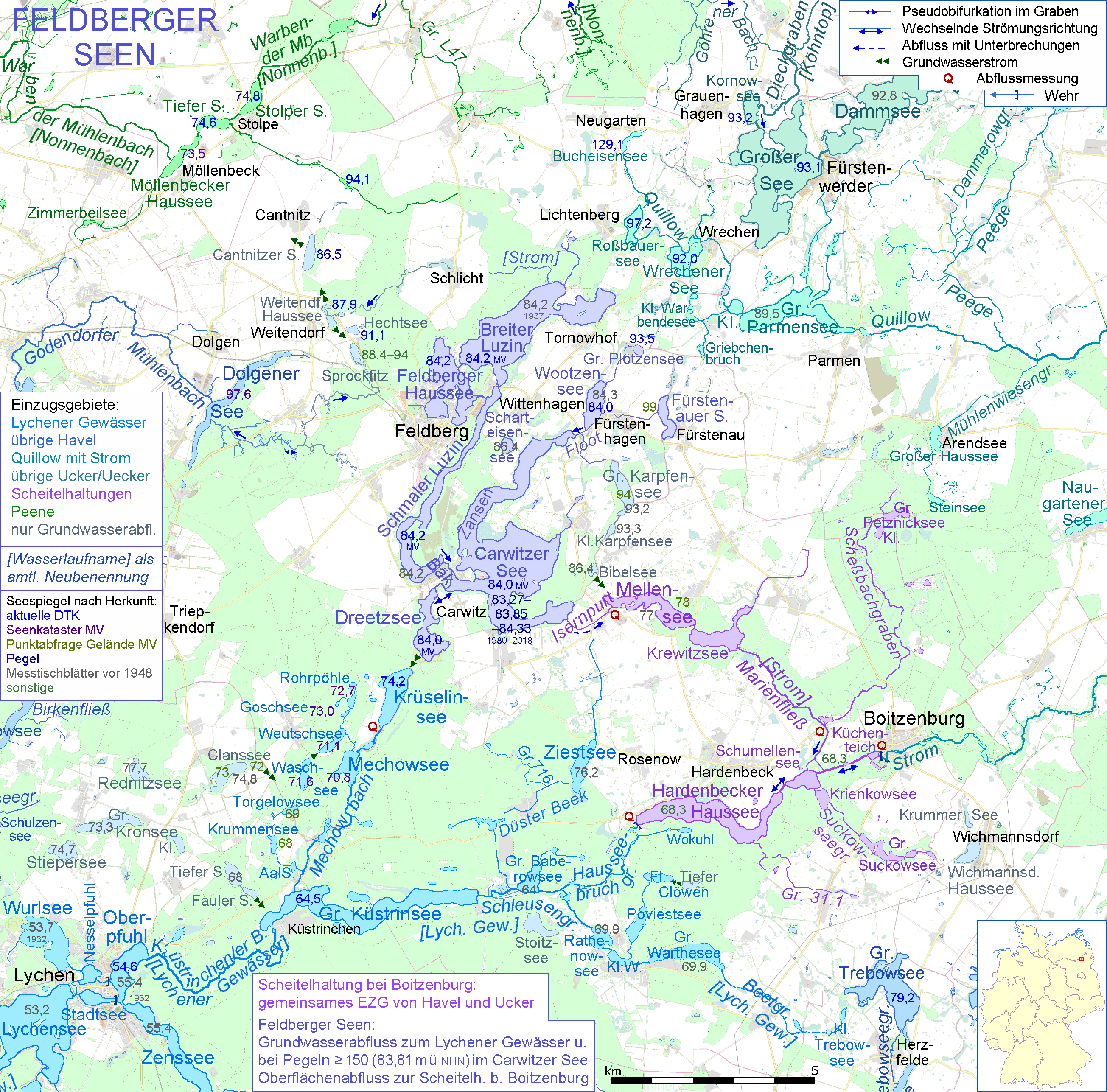
The lakes, the municipality of Feldberger Seenlandschaft is named after

== Notable people ==
- Irma Grese (Wrechen), Nazi SS Holocaust concentration camp supervisor executed for war crimes

== See also ==
- Feldberg Lake District Nature Park
