= Lucin =

Lucin may refer to:

- Lucin, Garwolin County, a village in east-central Poland
- Lucin, Zwoleń County in Masovian Voivodeship (east-central Poland)
- Lucin, Pomeranian Voivodeship (north Poland)
- Lucin, West Pomeranian Voivodeship (north-west Poland)
- Lucin, Utah, a historic ghost town in north-west Utah, USA
- Lucin Cutoff, a railroad trestle which crossed the Great Salt Lake in Utah, USA

== See also ==
- Luzin (disambiguation)
- Lusin (disambiguation)
