= Serrahn Hills =

Mountain in Germany

Coordinates: 53°20′24″N 13°11′51″E

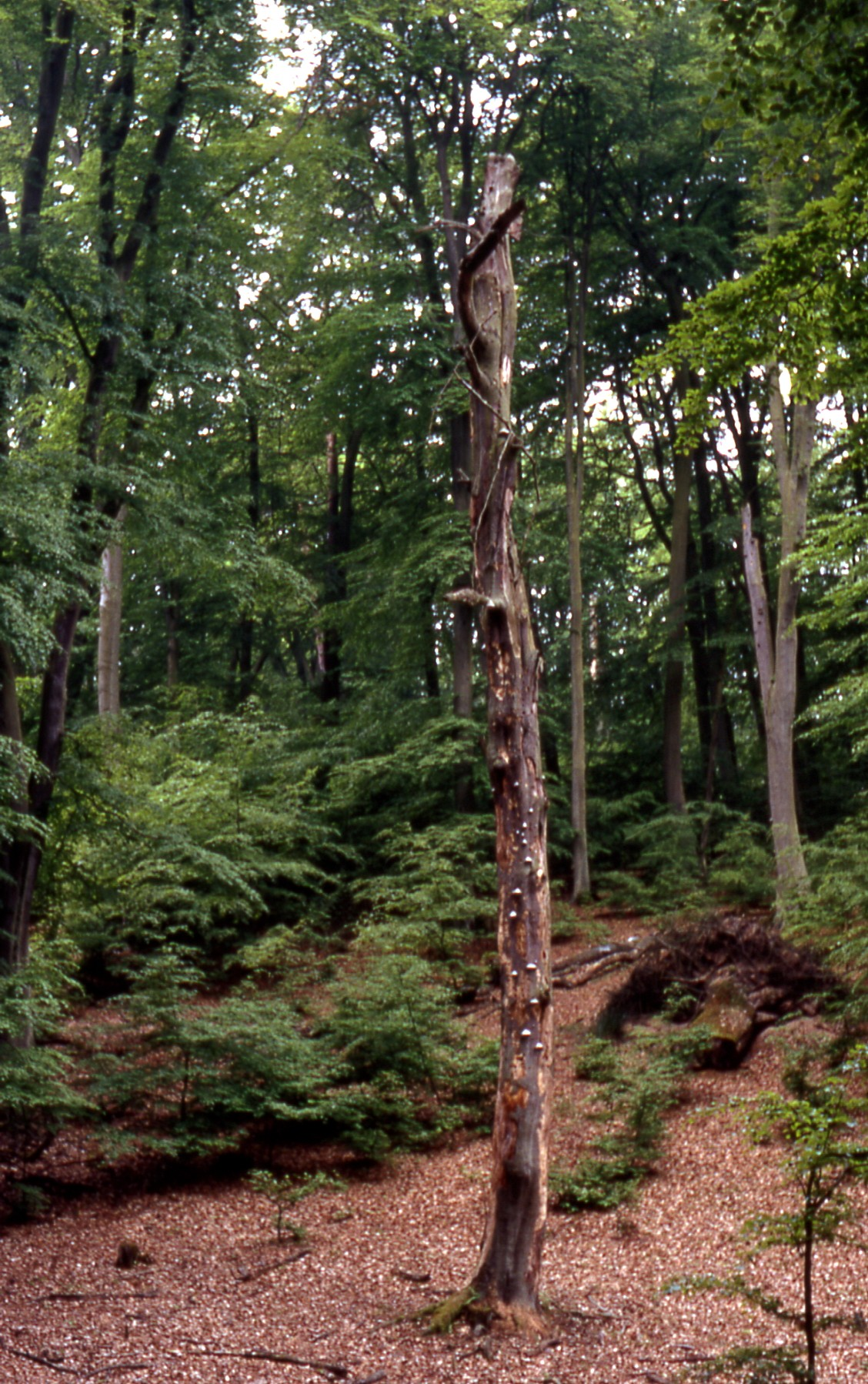
Beech wood in the Serrahn Hills

The Serrahn Hills (German: Serrahner Berge) are a forested ridge in the municipality of Carpin in the Mecklenburg Lake District in the east German state Mecklenburg-Western Pomerania. The village of Serrahn, which gives the hills their name, is located just north of the ridge. To the east is the lake of Schweingartensee, a little to the southwest is the Großer Fürstenseer See.

The hills, which are up to 124.2 m above sea level (NHN), are located in the eastern part of the Müritz National Park. The hills were first mentioned in an official document dated 1569. This states that der Schweingahrdische See zwischen Zerrahnschen undt Goldbowischen Holtz belegen ("the Schweingarten lake is located between the Serrahn and the Goldbow Woods").

During the period 1614 to 1623, documents record the sale of building timber and firewood from the Zerrahnschen Bergen. After that, the forest must have been thinned so much before the mid-16th century that by the end of that century large flocks of sheep grazed the Serrahn Hills from time to time.

At the end of the Thirty Years' War much of the surrounding area was devastated and the forest spread again. Thus in 1688 we hear that the Zerrahnschen Berge stet reich von Eychen Mast undt dannen Holtz, undt können darin feist gemacht werden 465 Schweine (the "Serrahn Hills are rich in oak mast and their trees and 465 pigs can be kept there").

At the beginning of the 18th century at the instigation of the Duke of Strelitz, Adolphus Frederick II, numerous glassworks and potash distilleries were founded in the region, but the Serrahn Hills remained unaffected due to poor road communications and its forests remained largely intact. This made it a popular hunting area as well as a botanical forestry research site for the dukes of Mecklenburg-Strelitz.

In GDR times, the hills were designated as a nature reserve and became well known as the centre of the great state hunting grounds called the Wilhelminenhof Wildlife Research Area (Wildforschungsgebiet Wilhelminenhof).

Since June 2011, the beech forests of the Serrahn Hills, along with four other German beech forests, have been recognised as a UNESCO World Heritage Site. They are the last remaining semi-natural beech forests in Germany.
