= Carpin =

- Municipality
- Coat of arms

- Location of Carpin within Mecklenburgische Seenplatte district
- Interactive map of Carpin
- Location within Germany Location within Mecklenburg-Vorpommern
- Coordinates: 53°20′N 13°14′E
- Country: Germany
- State: Mecklenburg-Vorpommern
- District: Mecklenburgische Seenplatte
- Municipal assoc.: Neustrelitz-Land

Government
  - Mayor: Regina Sendel

Area
  - Total: 63.64 km^{2} (24.57 sq mi)
- Elevation: 80 m (260 ft)

Population (2025-12-31)
  - Total: 773
  - Density: 12.1/km^{2} (31.5/sq mi)
- Time zone: UTC+01:00 (CET)
  - Summer (DST): UTC+02:00 (CEST)
- Postal codes: 17237
- Dialling codes: 039821
- Vehicle registration: MST
- Website: www.amtneustrelitz-land.de

Carpin is a municipality in the Mecklenburgische Seenplatte district, in Mecklenburg-Vorpommern, Germany.

== Geography ==
The municipality of Carpin lies within the Feldberg Lake District Nature Park, the southern part of the offshoot of the Müritz National Park with its 101 metre high Galgenberg hill and the lake of Schweingartensee east of Neustrelitz. The region is characterised by other lakes in the Mecklenburg Lake District, such as the Schweingartensee and Lake Carpin, as well as a gently rolling countryside which is densely wooded to the west. The highest point in the municipal territory lies in the Serrahn Hills at 113.7 m above sea level (NHN).
