= Luzin =

Luzin may refer to:

- Nikolai Luzin (1883–1950), Russian mathematician
  - Lusin's theorem, named after Nikolai Luzin
- 5096 Luzin (1983 RC5), a main-belt asteroid
- Breiter Luzin, a lake in Mecklenburg-Vorpommern, Germany
- Schmaler Luzin, a lake in Landkreis Mecklenburg-Strelitz, Mecklenburg-Vorpommern, Germany
- Luzin (crater), an impact crater on Mars in the Arabia quadrangle

== See also ==
- Lusin (disambiguation)
- Luzi
