= Wreechener See Nature Reserve =

Nature reserve in Mecklenburg-Vorpommern, Germany

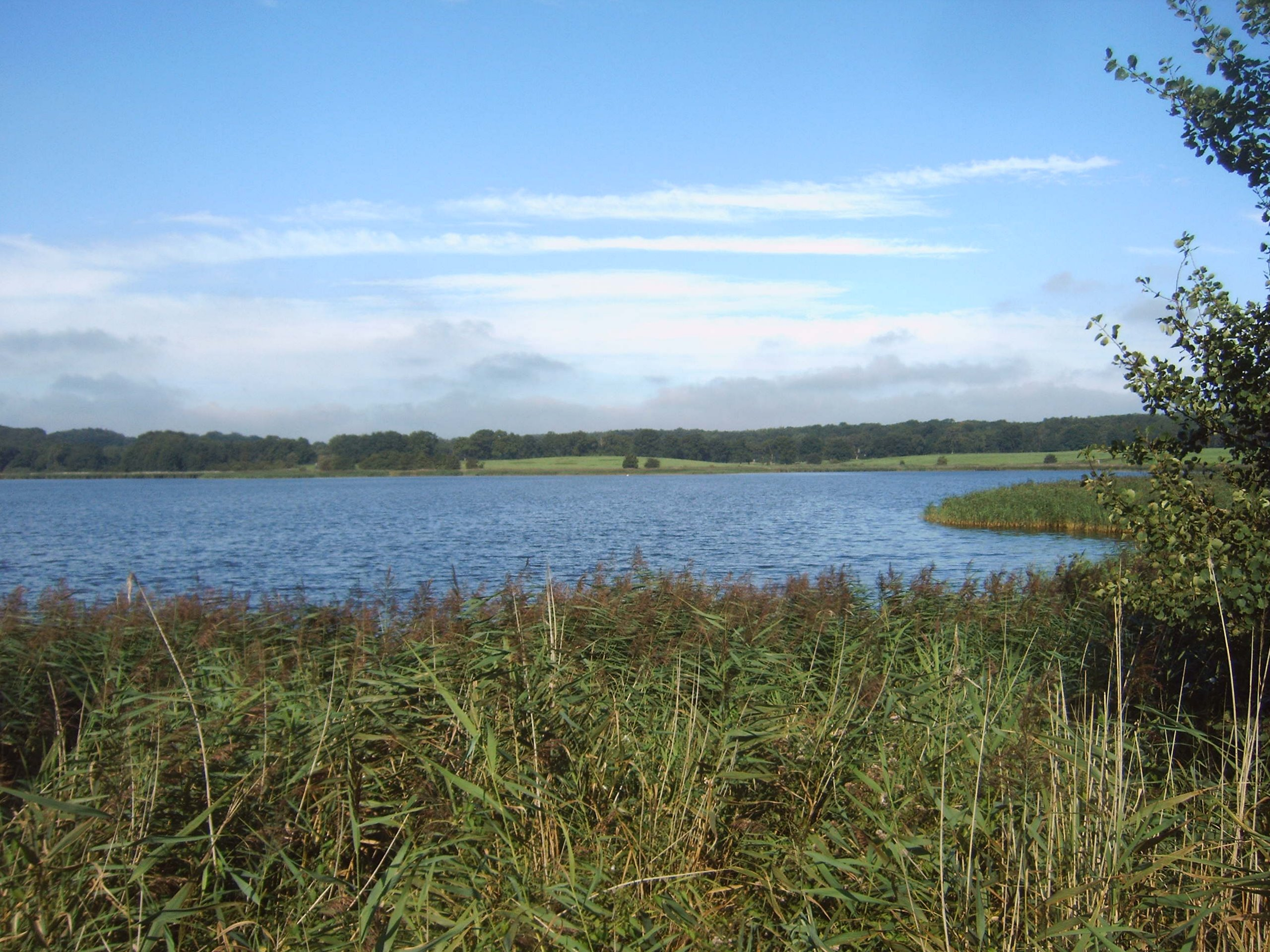
- View from the eastern shore

- Location within Mecklenburg-Vorpommern Location within Germany
- Nearest city: Wreechen
- Coordinates: 54.33054°N 13.45808°E
- Area: 72 hectares (0.28 sq mi)

The Wreechener See Nature Reserve (German: Naturschutzgebiet Wreechener See) is a nature reserve in the German state of Mecklenburg-Vorpommern. It lies 2 kilometres south of the town of Putbus and has an area of 72 hectares. It was placed under protection on 12 September 1990 as part of the creation of the Southeast Rügen Biosphere Reserve. The purpose of its designation as a nature reserve is to preserve a lagoon-like cove (or bodden) in the Bay of Greifswald as one of the last regional quiet areas for resting water birds. The Wreechener See also has areas undergoing natural silting up that support special communities and are breeding grounds for rare bird species. Adjacent wet meadows are extensively used.

Nearby villages are Wreechen, immediately to the east, Krakvitz and Neukamp. The cove is linked to the Bay of Greifswald by a short narrow channel spanned by a wooden road bridge.

The condition of the reserve is only classed as satisfactory, because the water condition is affected by discharges of agricultural fertiliser. In 1997, there was mass fish mortality due to the lack of oxygen in the water of this hypertrophic lake. The macrophyte flora almost entirely disappeared, but has recolonised the lake in several areas. Reed continues to be harvested for thatch within the reserve.

In the north of the reserve there is a refuge hut with a good view of the lake and the Baltic Sea beyond. The road from Neukamp to Wreechen runs immediately along the eastern border of the reserve.

According to EU law, the area is a Special Area of Conservation as well as a Special Protection Area for birds.

== History ==
The Wreecher See was formed as a result of a block of dead ice during the last ice age. As the sea level rose during the Littorina Transgression, the area was flooded and was joined to the Rügischer Bodden. Coastal development processes led to the formation of sand spits which separated the lake more and more from the bodden. The lake silted up and a belt of bushes and reeds formed. In the west, valley bogs und spring fens formed.

Two megalithic graves south of the reserve indicate that the area has been settled since the New Stone Age. Not far south of Neukamp, Prussian troops landed in 1678 and began the Invasion of Rügen.

== Flora and fauna ==
Reed beds influenced by the bodden water surround the lake. Typical species are common reed, saltmarsh rush, sea aster, softstem bulrush, tule and water mint. Adjacent meadows contain small areas of salt marsh. Here there are brookweed, meadow fleabane, sea arrowgrass, marsh arrowgrass, common fleabane, adder's-tongue and Irish marsh-orchid.

Originally grasses such as fennel pondweed, hornwort, pond water-crowfoot and stonewort used to occur in the lake. After they had disappeared in previous decades as a result of fertiliser discharge and subsequent loss of water quality, in recent years new colonies of these species have re-established themselves.

The breeding birds in the reserve are the reed warbler, reed bunting as well as various ducks. The reserve is of outstanding importance as a roosting area for ducks like the mallard, pochard, tufted duck, goldeneye and pintail as well as red-breasted merganser, goosander and smew. In spring and autumn Caspian terns may also be seen.

Slowworms, viviparous lizards, European tree frogs and green frogs are also found in the reserve.

== Literature ==
- Umweltministerium Mecklenburg-Vorpommern, ed. (2003), "Wreechener See 192", Die Naturschutzgebiete in Mecklenburg-Vorpommern (in German), Schwerin: Demmler-Verlag, pp. 250f, ISBN 3-91-015052-7
