= Wreecher See =

Bay in Germany

Coordinates: 54°19′53″N 13°27′27″E

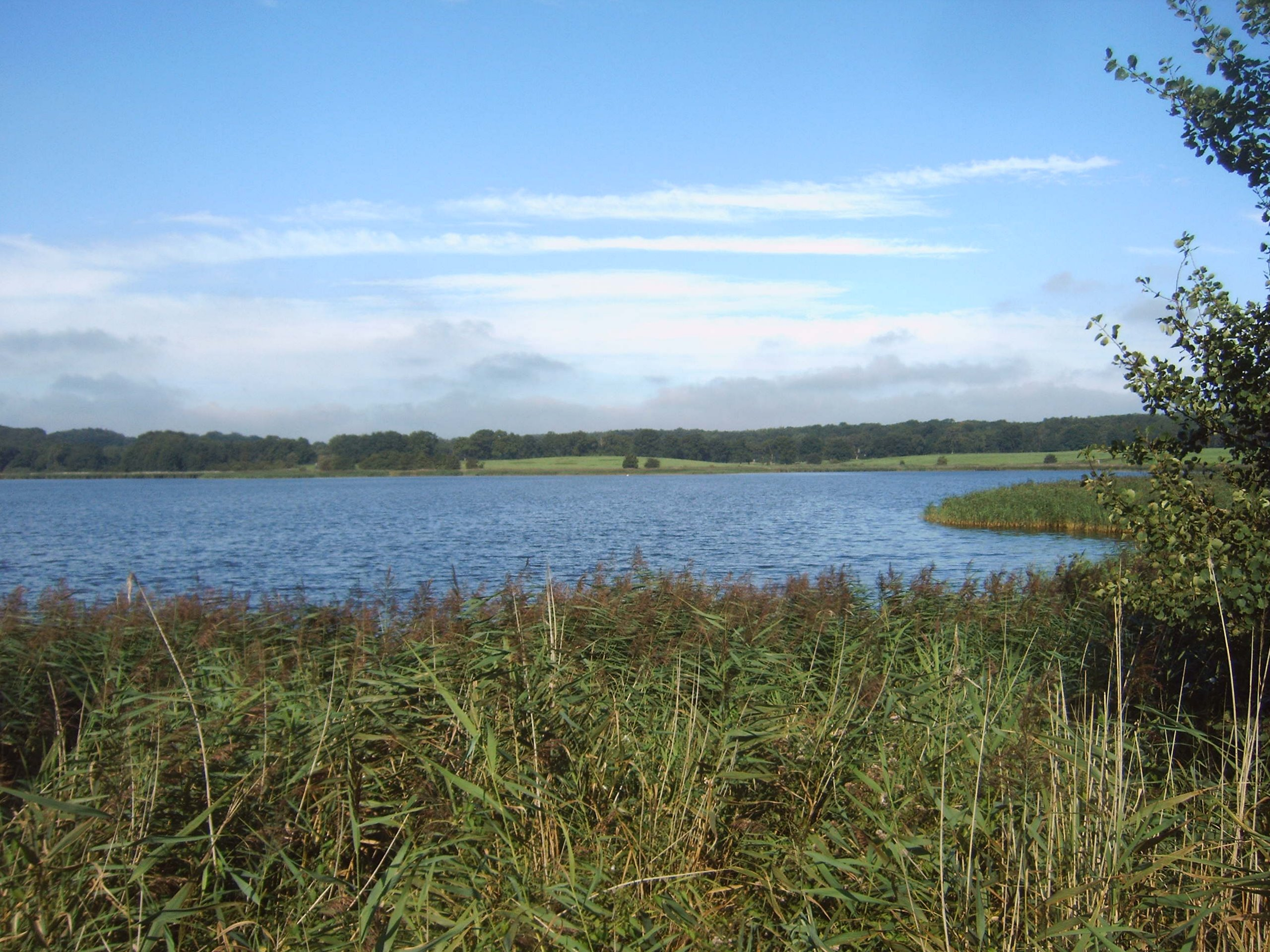
Wreecher See – view from the eastern shore

The Wreecher See is a cove, southwest of the town of Putbus on the German Baltic Sea island of Rügen.

The bay is named after the village of Wreechen on its eastern shore. On its southern shore are the settlements of Glowitz and Neukamp.

This body of water, which is designated as a nature reserve, has an area of 77 hectares and is part of the Southeast Rügen Biosphere Reserve. Within that reserve it lies within Conservation zone II (a maintained zone). The Wreecher See is a large cove with a short, narrow channel linking it to the Rügischer Bodden to the east, a large bay on the coast of Rügen. A wide belt of reeds surrounds the lake, which acts as a breeding, resting and overwintering area for many birds.

North of the lake is an area of seepage with reed meadows.

== See also ==
- Wreechener See Nature Reserve
