= Heilige Hallen =

Nature reserve in Mecklenburg-Vorpommern, Germany

Coordinates: 53°19′31″N 13°22′12″E

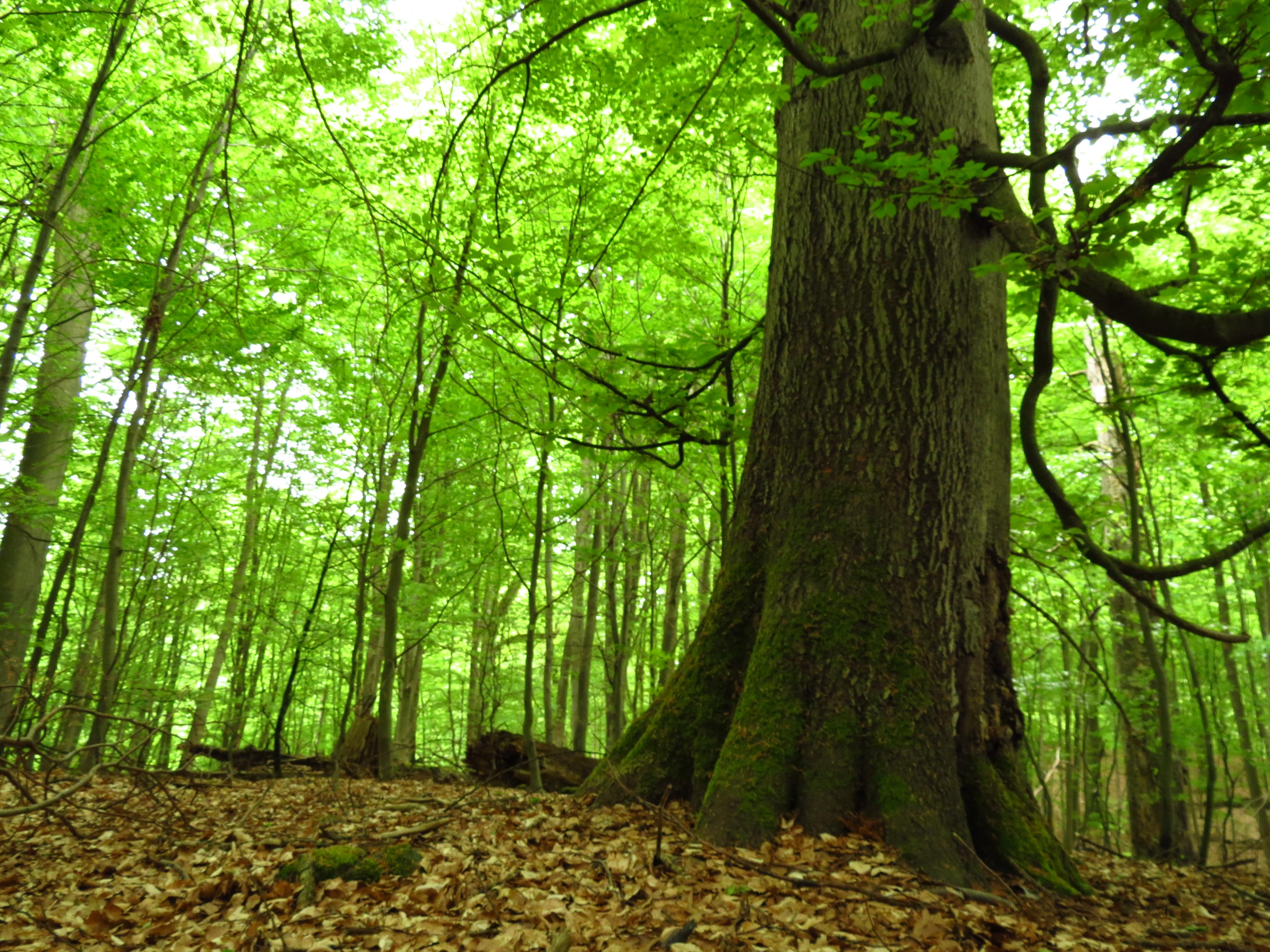
Old beech tree in the nature reserve

The Heilige Hallen ("Holy Halls") are one of the oldest beech woods in Germany and are found in the district of Mecklenburgische Seenplatte in Mecklenburg, 3.5 kilometres west of Feldberg. In the mid 19th century, Grand Duke George of Strelitz, impressed by the giant, columnar trees, ordered that this woodland should be protected and looked after for all time.

The 25 hectare core area of the forest has been a nature reserve since 24 February 1938.

Because several of the already 350-year-old, up-to-53-metre-high trees have exceeded their natural life span, the wood today has a large amount of dead wood. In 1993, the area of the reserve was increased from 25 to 65.5 hectares.

== Literature ==
- Klaus Borrmann: Heilige Hallen aktuell. 70 Jahre NSG (1938-2008). In: Labus, Vol. 28/2008, pp. 67–76
- Alexis Scamoni: Heilige Hallen. In: Natur und Naturschutz in Mecklenburg. Vol. 3/1965, pp. 37–50 and pp. 69–70
