= Pohnstorf Moor =

Nature reserve in Mecklenburg-Vorpommern, Germany

Coordinates: 53°55′23″N 11°05′23″E

The Pohnstorf Moor Nature Reserve (German: Naturschutzgebiet Pohnstorfer Moor) is a nature reserve in the German state of Mecklenburg-Vorpommern. It lies in the southwest of the Klützer Winkel ("Klütz Corner") in the district of Nordwestmecklenburg.

The nature reserve has an area of 33 hectares and covers parts of the parishes of Roggenstorf (Gemarkung Grevenstein) and Damshagen (Gemarkungen Welzin and Pohnstorf) and was established on 27 June 2005 under the official number N 326. Its aim is the permanent protection, preservation and development of a biotope complex comprising partly wooded, alkaline fens (Kalkflachmooren), damp and wet meadows and hillocks of calcareous grassland.

The region was previously extensively farmed, predominantly as cattle pasture and hay meadows, and is therefore especially rich in species that like damp and wet meadows, including endangered species of plants and animals and even those threatened by extinction.

== History ==
The region lies embedded in terminal moraine landscape formed by glaciation . The Pohnstorf Moor itself was formed by the drying out of a calcareous-mesotrophic lake.

== Flora and fauna ==
An extensive marsh complex occupies the central part of the territory. There are sedges, rushes and reed stands. The peat layer is only a few tens of centimetres high. In the western part of the area there are carr woodlands of willow, birch and alder.
