= Görmitz =

Island in Germany

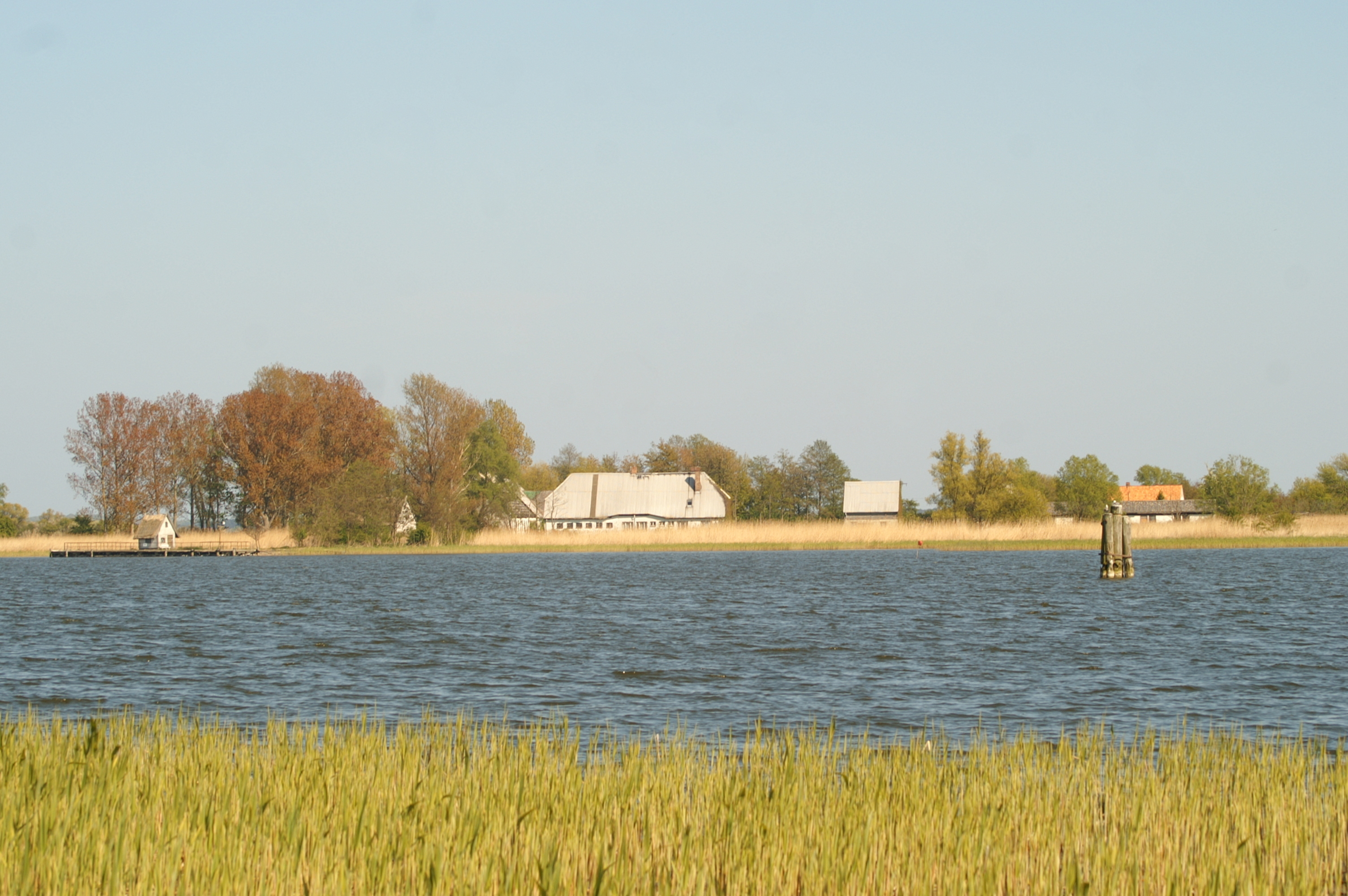
- Interactive map of Görmitz

Geography
- Location: Achterwasser, Baltic Sea
- Coordinates: 54°1′27″N 13°55′20″E
- Area: 99.14 ha (245.0 acres)
- Length: 1.7 km (1.06 mi)
- Width: 0.938 km (0.5828 mi)

Administration
- Germany
- Capital city: Görmitz

Demographics
- Population: 4 (farmers)

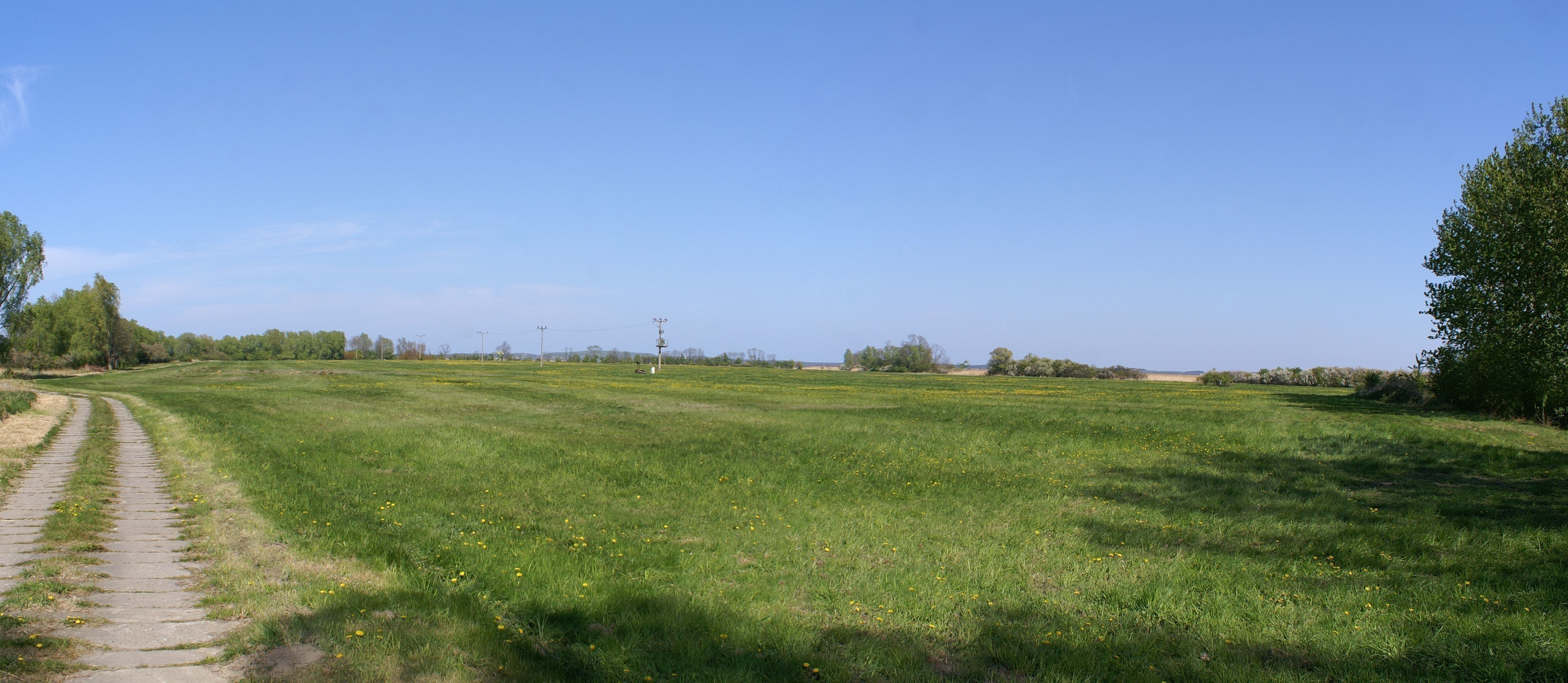
Pasture on Görmitz

Görmitz (German pronunciation: [ˈɡœʁmɪts]) is a small island in the Achterwasser lagoon or bodden on the island of Usedom. The island is a nature reserve, which is managed by the Jordsand Society for the Protection of Seabirds and Nature (Verein Jordsand zum Schutze der Seevögel und der Natur).

Görmitz belongs to the parish of Lütow in the Amt of Am Peenestrom. In the south of the island there is an inhabited farm, the remains of a holiday home and a beacon.

In the 1960s Görmitz was linked to Usedom near the village of Neuendorf by an embankment. Its construction was connected with oil extraction in Lütow; oil was also extracted on Görmitz in the 1970s and 1980s.

At the end of 2016 the controversial dismantling of the causeway was agreed.

== History ==
For over 700 years the island was in the possession of the von Lepel family. In 1937 the island was sold to a Dr. Kerkhoff from Düsseldorf. After 1945 and after the land reform, refugees came to the island and reared cattle and raised crops. The island was then a recreation retreat for the firm of Nachrichtenelektronik Greifswald and after 1990 the property of Siemens AG. Today, the island is almost entirely under conservation protection. In July 2006 Siemens AG sold the island of Görmitz to the firm of Wertgrund Insel Görmitz GmbH.
