= Wreechen =

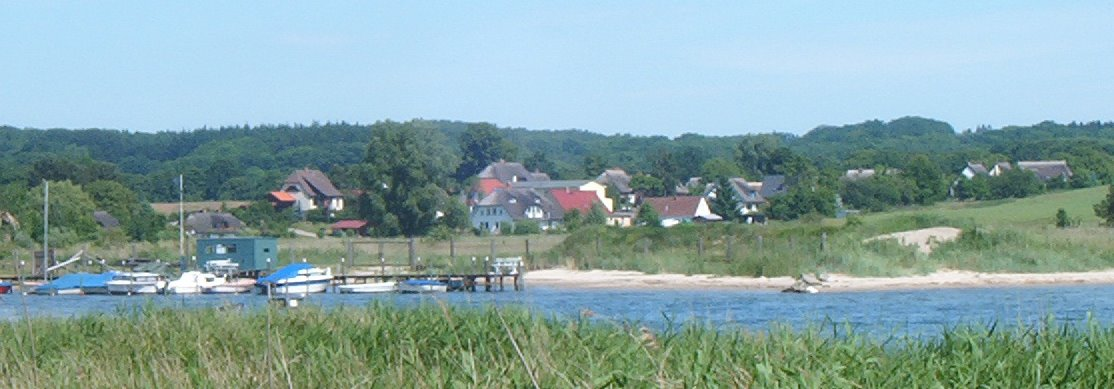
Wreechen seen from Neukamp

Wreechen is a village in the borough of Putbus on the German Baltic Sea island of Rügen.

== Location ==
The village lies in picturesque countryside between the lake of Wreecher See to the west and the Baltic Sea bay of Rügischer Bodden to the east. It lies strung out along the roughly north–south running road from Putbus to Neukamp. Northwest of the village is the farmstead of the former Wreechen Watermill which now houses a small exhibition of sculptures and email art.

== History ==
Wreechen was first mentioned in 1318. The name may be derived from the Slavic Vrechy, which means "nut", suggesting that it was originally a settlement with a number of nut trees.

As early as the 14th century the settlement had been divided into Groß and Klein Wreechen ("Great Wreechen" and "Little Wreechen"). Klein Wreechen covered the land around the watermill at Wreechen. In the 16th century there is evidence of the existence of a pub there. Groß Wreechen was the actual farming village. Initially there was one farm there. In 1532 Groß Wreechen is recorded as having two farms and two cottages. Both Wreechens belonged to the estate of the lords of Putbus.

The watermill was first mentioned in 1396. In 1794, a post windmill was built for the miller to replace the watermill as a result of the lack of water. Another windmill, used collectively by the smaller farmers, was located east of the village. The post mill was burnt down in an arson attack in 1899. In 1927 Wreechen was connected to the electricity and the communal mill closed. The watermill remained in operation until 1936.

After the Wende in 1989, a variety of buildings were erected in Wreechen. They did not change the fundamental appearance of the village, but the original dispersed settlement now rather resembles a linear village.

== Economy ==
The village is dominated by tourism. There are small to medium-sized accommodation providers.

== See also ==
- Wreechener See Nature Reserve
