= Nieklitzer Moor Nature Reserve =

Nature reserve in Mecklenburg-Vorpommern, Germany

Coordinates: 53.4981°N 10.8809°E

Naturschutzgebiet Nieklitzer Moor (Nieklitzer Moor Nature Reserve) is a 53 hectare broad Naturschutzgebiet in Mecklenburg-Western Pomerania. Southwest of Zarrentin am Schaalsee, north of Gallin, it was established on March 21, 1977, for the protection and development of largely nutrient poor mire. The field condition has an unsatisfactory assessment. Profound drainage measures are adversely affecting this area and lead to almost completely removing peat-like vegetation. An inspection in the protected areas is not possible.
