= Carwitzer See =

Lake in Mecklenburg-Vorpommern, Germany

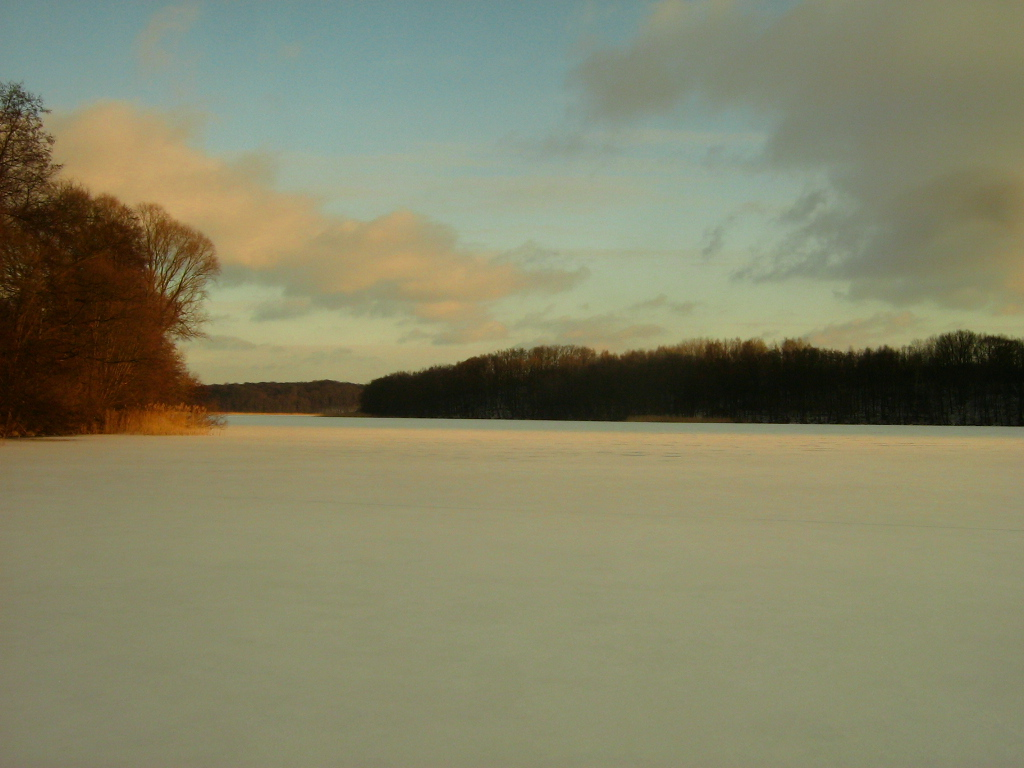

- Location within Mecklenburg-Vorpommern
- Location: Feldberger Seenlandschaft, Mecklenburgische Seenplatte, Mecklenburg-Vorpommern
- Coordinates: 53°18′16″N 13°27′53″E
- Basin countries: Germany
- Surface area: 7.22 km^{2} (2.79 sq mi)
- Average depth: 9.2 m (30 ft)
- Max. depth: 42.2 m (138 ft)
- Surface elevation: 83.8 m (275 ft)

Carwitzer See (German pronunciation: [ˈkaːɐ̯ˌvɪt͡sɐ ˈzeː]) is a lake at Carwitz in the municipality Feldberger Seenlandschaft in the Mecklenburgische Seenplatte district, Mecklenburg-Vorpommern, Germany. At an elevation of 83.8 m, its surface area is 7.22 km² incl. the lake Zansen.
