= Schweingartensee =

Lake in Germany

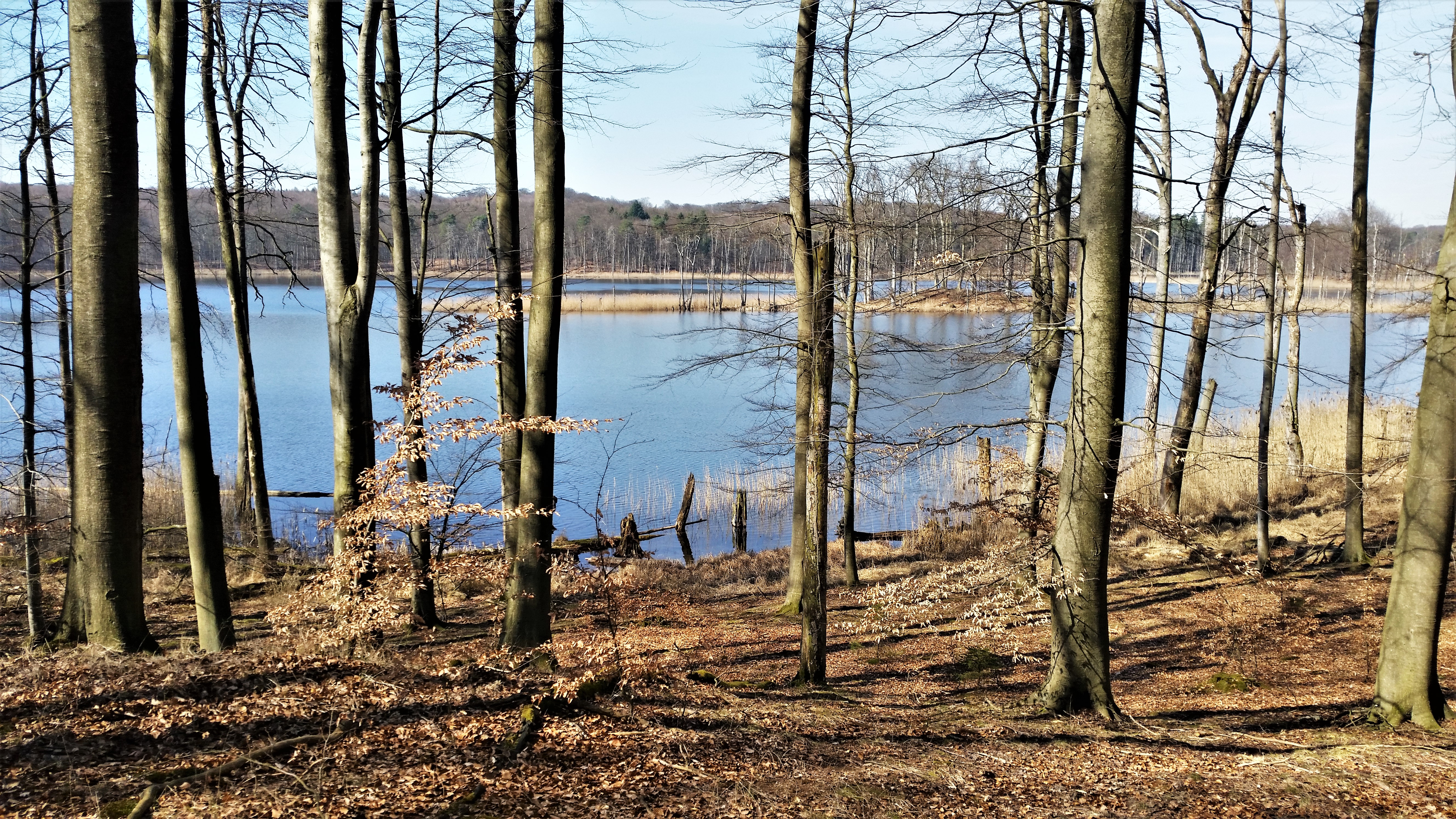

- Location within Mecklenburg-Vorpommern
- Location: Mecklenburgische Seenplatte, Mecklenburg-Vorpommern
- Coordinates: 53°20′11.07″N 13°13′12.25″E
- Primary outflows: none
- Basin countries: Germany
- Surface area: 0.747 km^{2} (0.288 sq mi)
- Surface elevation: 72 m (236 ft)

Schweingartensee is a lake in the Mecklenburgische Seenplatte district in Mecklenburg-Vorpommern, Germany. At an elevation of 72 m, its surface area is 0.747 km².

The surrounding countryside reaches a height of 124.2 m above sea level (NHN) in the Serrahn Hills.
