= Carpiner See =

Lake in the state of Mecklenburg-Vorpommern, Germany

- Location within Mecklenburg-Vorpommern
- Location: Mecklenburgische Seenplatte, Mecklenburg-Vorpommern
- Coordinates: 53.35922°N 13.24109°E
- Basin countries: Germany
- Surface area: 0.043 km^{2} (0.017 sq mi)
- Surface elevation: 64.2 m (211 ft)

Carpiner See is a lake in the Mecklenburgische Seenplatte district in Mecklenburg-Vorpommern, Germany. It has an elevation of 64.2 m and surface area of 0.043 km^{2}.
