= Putzarer See =

Lake in Germany

- Location within Mecklenburg-Vorpommern
- Location: Vorpommern-Greifswald, Mecklenburg-Vorpommern
- Coordinates: 53°42′10″N 13°40′25″E
- Primary inflows: none
- Primary outflows: none
- Basin countries: Germany
- Max. length: 2,400 m (7,900 ft)
- Max. width: 940 m (3,080 ft)
- Surface area: 1.68 km^{2} (0.65 sq mi)
- Average depth: 0.4 m (1 ft 4 in)
- Max. depth: 2.1 m (6 ft 11 in)
- Water volume: 730,000 m^{3} (26,000,000 cu ft)
- Shore length^{1}: 6.5 km (4.0 mi)
- Surface elevation: 7.3 m (24 ft)
- ^{1} Shore length is not a well-defined measure.

Putzarer See is a lake in the Vorpommern-Greifswald district in Mecklenburg-Vorpommern, Germany. At an elevation of 7.3 m, its surface area is 1.68 km^{2} (1 sq mi).
