= Galenbecker See =

Body of water in Mecklenburg-Vorpommern, Germany

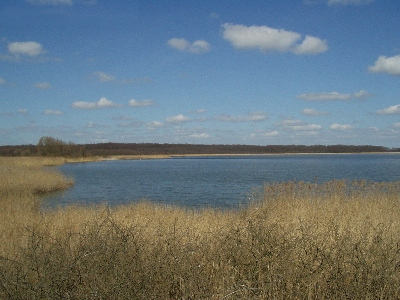

- Location within Mecklenburg-Vorpommern
- Location: Mecklenburgische Seenplatte, Mecklenburg-Vorpommern
- Coordinates: 53°37′19″N 13°43′58″E
- Primary inflows: Golmer Mühlbach
- Primary outflows: Weißer Graben
- Basin countries: Germany
- Surface area: 5.9 km^{2} (2.3 sq mi)
- Average depth: 0.75 m (2 ft 6 in)
- Max. depth: 1.85 m (6 ft 1 in)
- Surface elevation: 9.6 m (31 ft)

Ramsar Wetland
- Designated: 31 July 1978
- Reference no.: 177

Galenbecker See is a lake in the Mecklenburgische Seenplatte district in Mecklenburg-Vorpommern, Germany. At an elevation of 9.6 m, its surface area is 5.9 km^{2}.
