= Saltmarsh rush =

Saltmarsh rush or salt marsh rush is a common name for several plants and may refer to:

- Juncus gerardii, native to the Northern North America and Europe
- Juncus kraussii, native to the Southern hemisphere
- Juncus roemerianus, native to the Southeastern United States and Caribbean

== See also ==
- Bolboschoenus robustus, known as saltmarsh bulrush
- Eleocharis halophila, the saltmarsh spikerush
- Bolboschoenus maritimus, known as salt-marsh club-rush or saltmarsh bulrush
