= Lusin =

Lusin may refer to:

- Lu Xun (1881–1936), Chinese writer
- Nikolai Luzin (1883–1950), Russian mathematician
- Lošinj, an island in Croatia
- Luzino, a village in Wejherowo County, Pomeranian Voivodeship, in Poland
- "Lusin" (song), by Garik Papoyan and Sona Rubenyan, 2017

== See also ==
- Lusina (disambiguation)
- Lusine, American musician
