= Lusina =

Lusina may refer to the following places in Poland:

- Lusina, Lower Silesian Voivodeship (south-west Poland)
- Lusina, Lesser Poland Voivodeship (south Poland)
- Lusina, part of the Swoszowice district of Kraków
