= Großer Fürstenseer See =

Lake in Germany

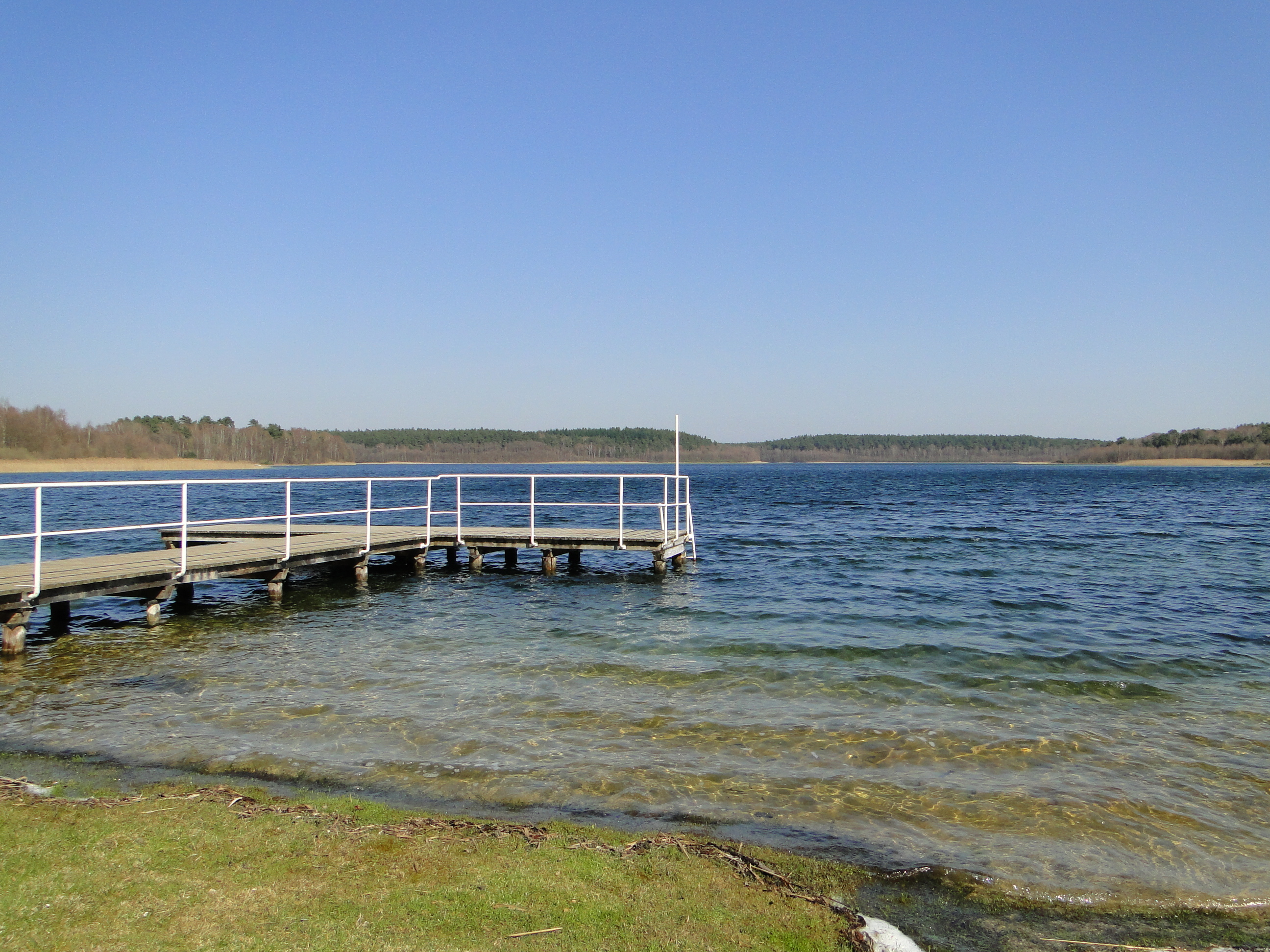

- Location within Mecklenburg-Vorpommern
- Location: Mecklenburgische Seenplatte, Mecklenburg-Vorpommern
- Coordinates: 53°18′17″N 13°9′50″E
- Primary outflows: Floßgraben
- Basin countries: Germany
- Surface area: 2.12 km^{2} (0.82 sq mi)
- Average depth: 4.3 m (14 ft)
- Max. depth: 25 m (82 ft)
- Surface elevation: 63.8 m (209 ft)

Großer Fürstenseer See (German pronunciation: [ˈɡʁoːsɐ ˈfʏʁstn̩ˌzeːɐ zeː]) is a lake in the Mecklenburgische Seenplatte district in Mecklenburg-Vorpommern, Germany. At an elevation of 63.8 m, its surface area is 2.12 km².
