= Feldberger Haussee =

Lake in Mecklenburg-Vorpommern, Germany

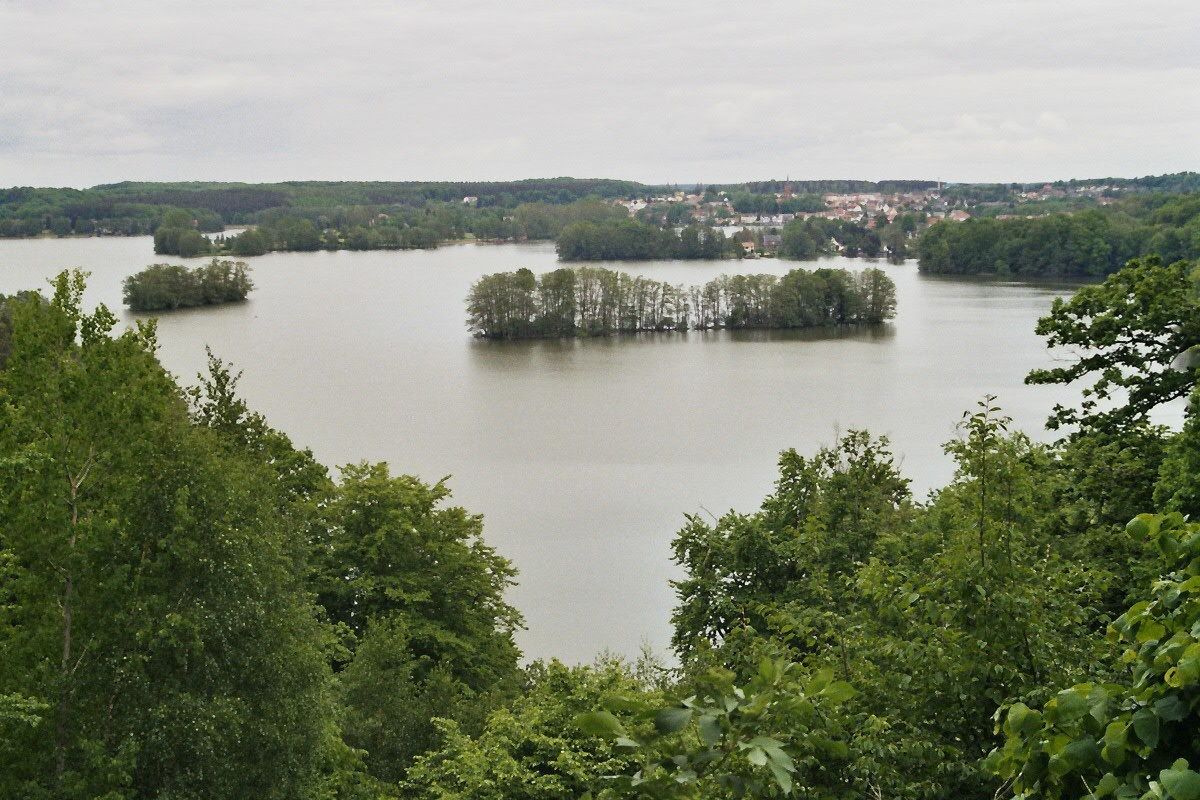
- View to the lake Feldberger Haussee from Reiherberg

- Location within Mecklenburg-Vorpommern
- Location: Mecklenburgische Seenplatte, Mecklenburg-Vorpommern
- Coordinates: 53°20′30″N 13°26′55″E
- Basin countries: Germany
- Surface area: 1.31 km^{2} (0.51 sq mi)
- Average depth: 4.9 m (16 ft)
- Max. depth: 12.5 m (41 ft)
- Surface elevation: 84.3 m (277 ft)

Feldberger Haussee (German pronunciation: [ˈfɛltˌbɛʁɡɐ ˈhaʊ̯sˌzeː]) is a lake in the Mecklenburgische Seenplatte district in Mecklenburg-Vorpommern, Germany. At an elevation of 84.3 m, its surface area is 1.31 km^{2}.
