= Schmaler Luzin =

Lake in Mecklenburg-Vorpommern, Germany

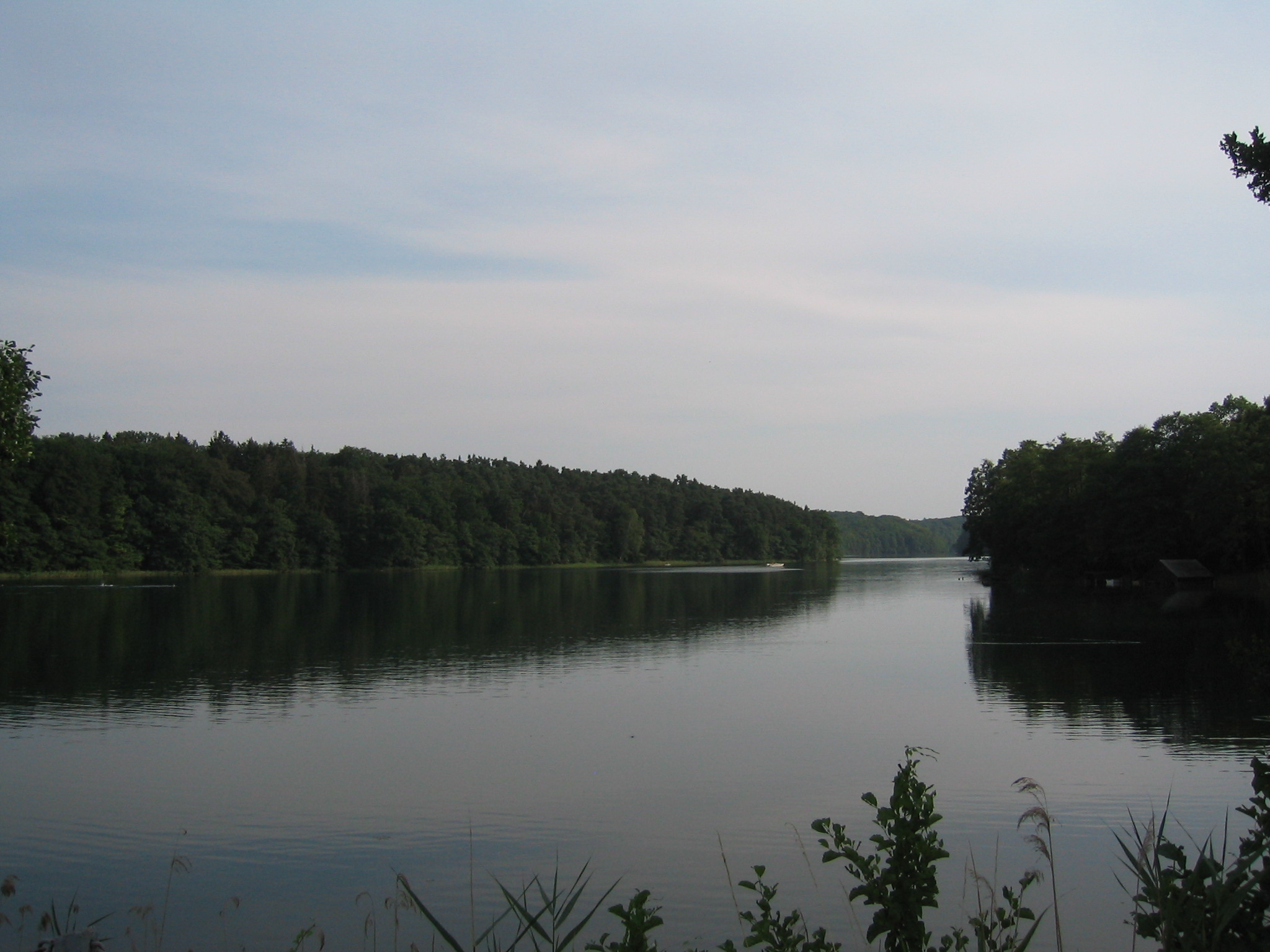

- Location within Mecklenburg-Vorpommern
- Location: Mecklenburgische Seenplatte, Mecklenburg-Vorpommern
- Coordinates: 53°19′6″N 13°26′8″E
- Basin countries: Germany
- Surface area: 1.29 km^{2} (0.50 sq mi)
- Max. depth: 34 m (112 ft)
- Surface elevation: 84.3 m (277 ft)

Schmaler Luzin (German pronunciation: [ˈʃmaːlɐ luˈt͡siːn]) is a lake in the Mecklenburgische Seenplatte district in Mecklenburg-Vorpommern, Germany. At an elevation of 84.3 m, its surface area is 1.29 km^{2}.
