= Breiter Luzin =

Lake in Mecklenburg-Vorpommern, Germany

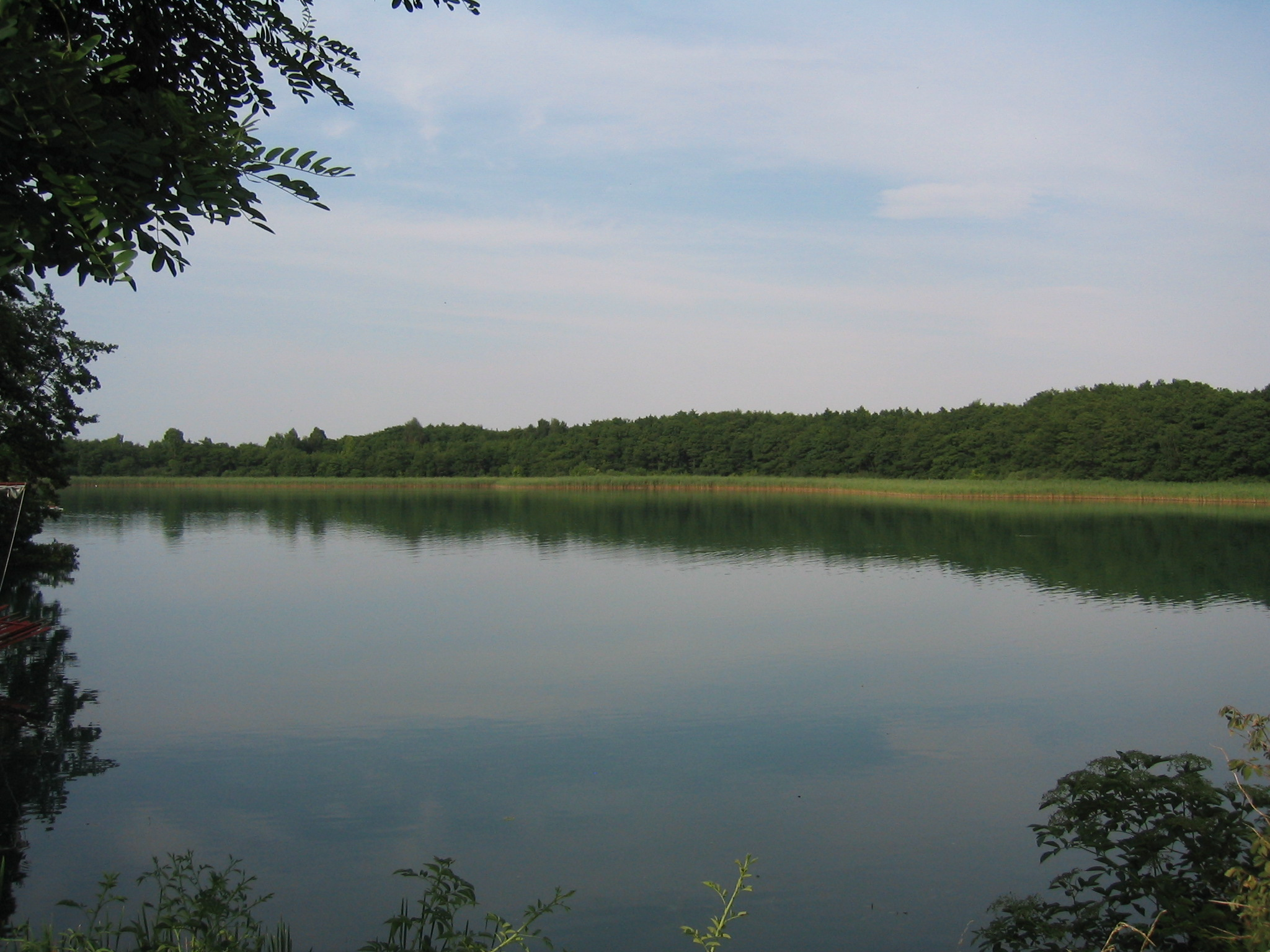

- Location within Mecklenburg-Vorpommern
- Location: Mecklenburg-Vorpommern
- Coordinates: 53°21′19″N 13°27′55″E
- Primary inflows: Luzin-Kanal
- Basin countries: Germany
- Surface area: 3.45 km^{2} (1.33 sq mi)
- Average depth: 22.3 m (73 ft)
- Max. depth: 58.3 m (191 ft)
- Surface elevation: 84.3 m (277 ft)

Breiter Luzin (German pronunciation: [ˈbʁaɪ̯tɐ luˈt͡siːn]) is a lake in Mecklenburg-Vorpommern, Germany. At an elevation of 84.3 m, its surface area is 3.45 km^{2}. It is home to an endemic dwarfed whitefish, Coregonus lucinensis.
