= Naturschutzgebiet =

Protected area for nature in Germany

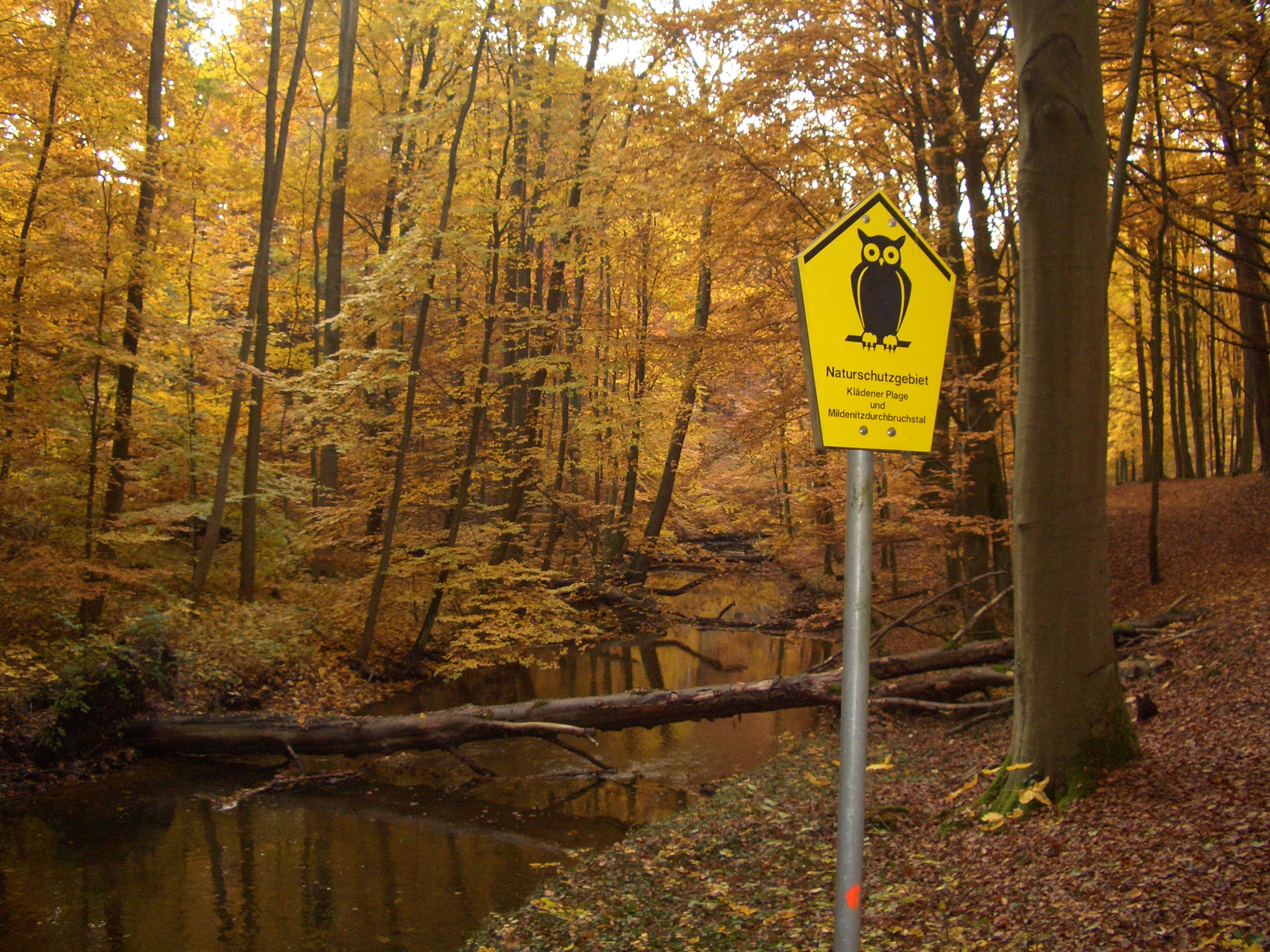
Nature reserve sign in the state of Mecklenburg-Vorpommern

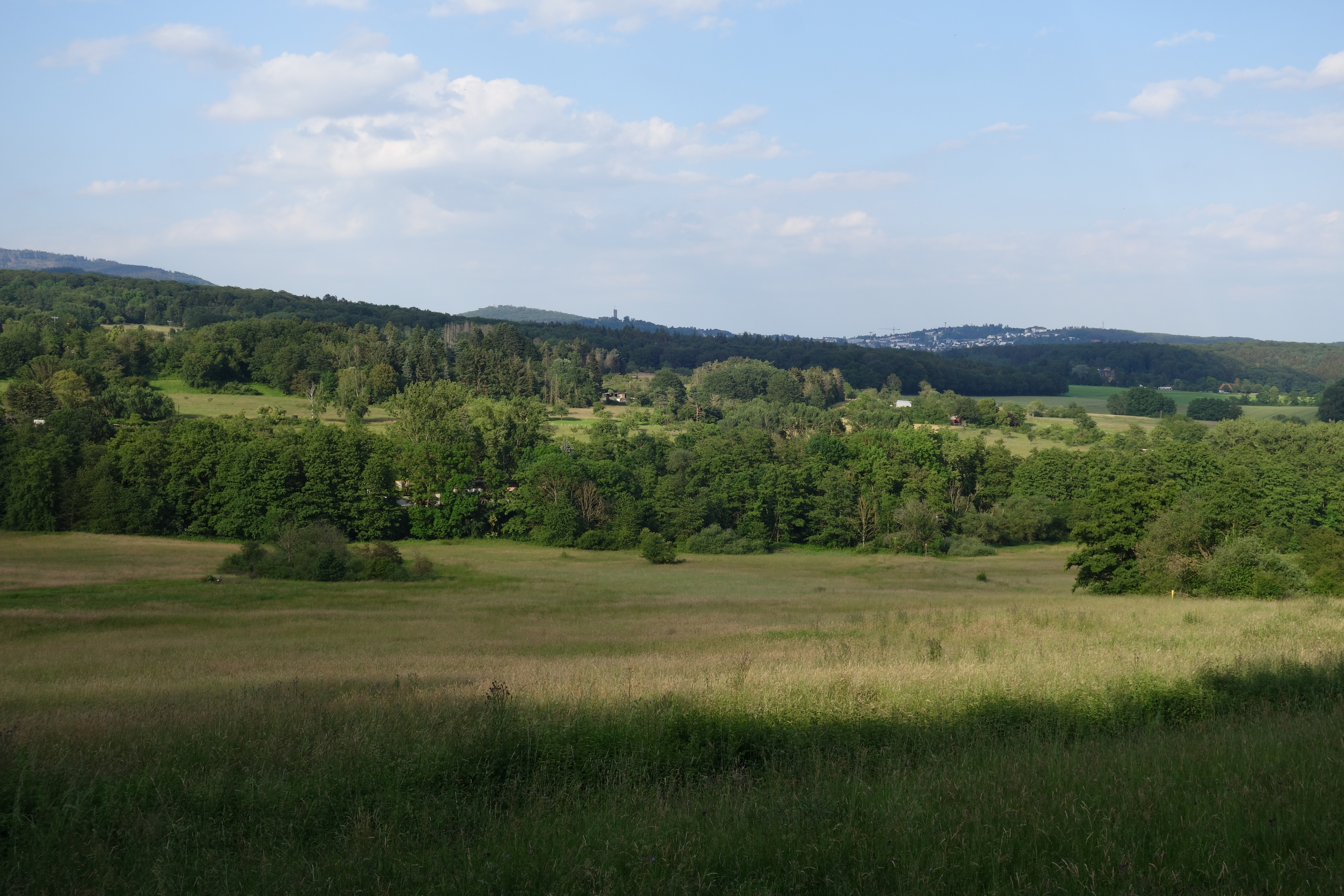
Naturschutzgebiet Krebsbachtal bei Ruppertshain (Kelkheim, Taunus)

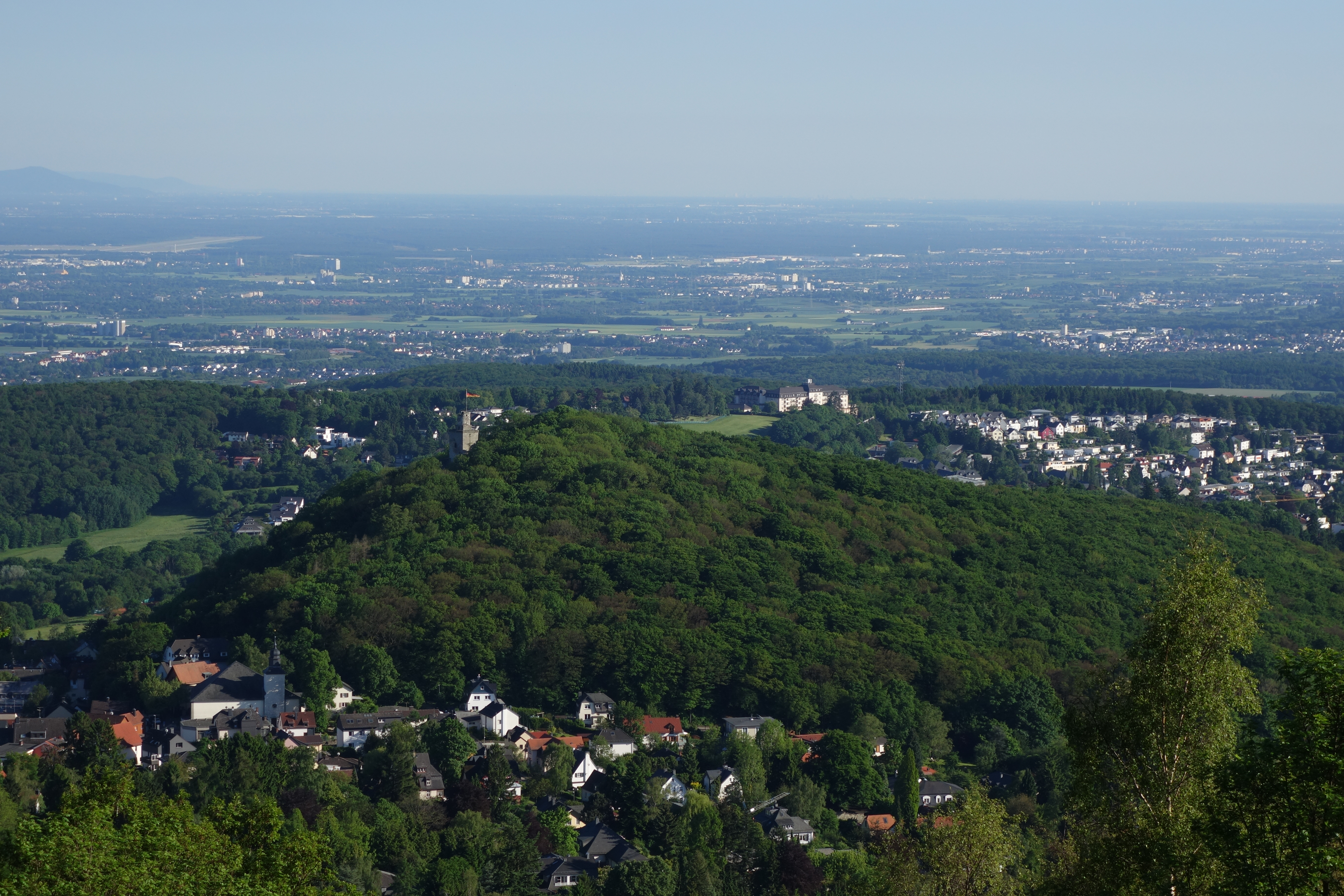
Naturschutzgebiet Burghain Falkenstein with Falkenstein Castle on top

In Germany, a Naturschutzgebiet (German pronunciation: [naˈtuːɐ̯ʃʊtsɡəˌbiːt]; abbreviated NSG; lit. 'nature protection area') is an area of nature reserve.

Although often translated as 'Nature Reserve' in English, the Federal Agency for Nature Conservation (BfN) refers to them as 'Nature Conservation Areas'. It meets the criteria of an IUCN Category IV – habitat or species management area.

== History ==
The first Naturschutzgebiet in Germany can be considered as Drachenfels at Koenigswinter, North Rhine-Westphalia. It was established in 1923.

== Legal base ==
The federal legal base of NSG is Federal Law of Natural Protection Area (Bundesnaturschutzgesetz; BNatSchG) § 23.

(1) stated that "Nature reserves are legally designated areas in which special protection of nature and landscape, either in their entirety or in specific parts, is required." (Naturschutzgebiete sind rechtsverbindlich festgesetzte Gebiete, in denen ein besonderer Schutz von Natur und Landschaft in ihrer Ganzheit oder in einzelnen Teilen erforderlich ist). The reason can be,

1. to protect a specific species;
2. for purpose of academic, natural history, or regional researching;
3. because it is "rare, distinctive or magnificent".

(2) stated that any operations which will pollute or damage the environment in this area should be prohibited.

(3) stated that no new water facility (mentioned in § 9 Absatz 2 Nummer 3 und 4 des Wasserhaushaltsgesetzes 'Section 9(2) numbers 3 and 4 of the Act of Water Resources') should be established.

In (4), within wide areas of NSG, it is not allowed to establish new light facility on streets or for advertisement; if it has been applied, it can be an exception, although it must process this conditions,

1. the conservation purposes of the area cannot be impaired; or
2. this is necessary for reasons of traffic safety or other public safety interests.

== Signage ==
Because legal restrictions are placed on activity within German nature reserves they have to be signed on the ground. Only by this means can e.g. walkers know that they are entering a nature reserve and may not e.g. leave the tracks and paths. For historical reasons there is no standard sign used across Germany.

Nature reserves in the "old states" of the Federal Republic of Germany are marked by green signs with the silhouette of a white-tailed eagle. In the new federal states of the former East Germany they are marked with a pentagonal yellow sign bearing an image of a long-eared owl. The reunification of Germany the 36th Environmental Minister's Conference in 1991 recommended the use of the owl symbol in future in the whole of Germany to designate nature reserves. This recommendation was not universally adopted by the states, in whom the jurisdiction for conservation policy was vested. For that reason there are de facto three different signs being used alongside one another in Germany today.

- Schleswig-Holstein, Mecklenburg-Western Pomerania, Brandenburg, Saxony-Anhalt, Thuringia and Saxony use the owl on a pentagon, Saxony-Anhalt employing a white background instead of the usual yellow.
- Berlin, Lower Saxony and Bremen use the owl in a green triangle.
- Hamburg, North Rhine-Westphalia, Hesse, Rhineland-Palatinate, the Saarland, Baden-Württemberg and Bavaria use the white-tailed eagle in a green triangle.
Owl on pentagonal sign

New sign with long-eared owl

Old sign with white-tailed eagle

== Sites ==
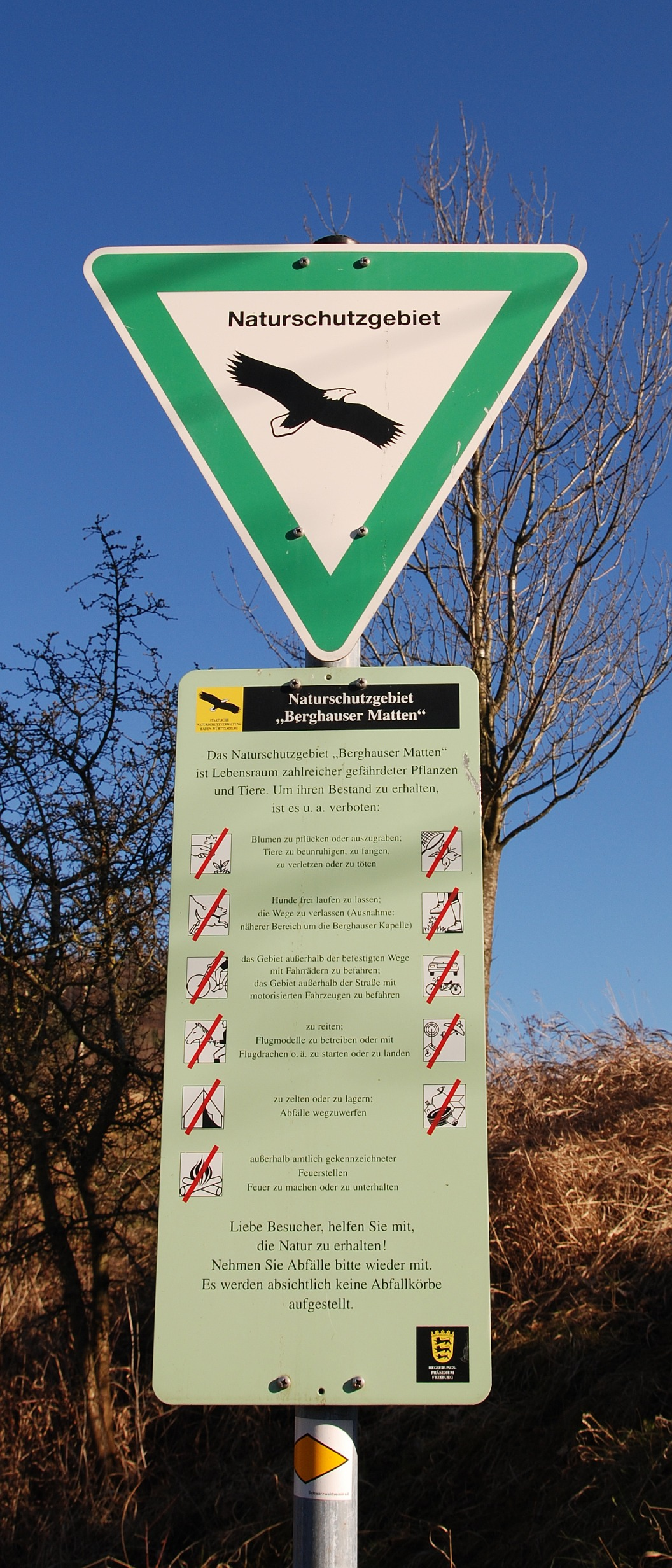
Old sign (only in West Germany) on a nature reserve, with a description, decrees and prohibitions

At the end of 2008 there were 8,413 nature reserves in Germany with a total area of 1,271,582 hectares. That corresponds to 3.6% of the area of Germany. The lowest percentage areas are in the states of Hesse (1.8%) and Rhineland-Palatinate (1.9%). The percentage coverage in the old and new states is identical. About 60% of all nature reserves are smaller than 50 hectares in area. In such small areas experts say that the achievement of conservation goals is at risk, because negative influences from the surrounding area cannot be sufficiently mitigated. The number and size of nature reserves has increased considerably in recent decades. In 1995 there were only 5,314 Naturschutzgebiete in Germany with an area of 6,845 km^{2}. Even the current coverage is seen by experts as too low to preserve the variety of species in Germany.

The following lists detail the nature reserves by state:

- Baden-Württemberg
- Bavaria
- Berlin
- Brandenburg
- Bremen
- Hamburg
- Hesse
- Mecklenburg-Western Pomerania
- Lower Saxony
- North Rhine-Westphalia
- Rhineland-Palatinate
- Saarland
- Saxony
- Saxony-Anhalt
- Schleswig-Holstein
- Thuringia

== See also ==
- Nature parks in Germany
