= Wilhelm Sauer =

German organ builder (1831–1916)

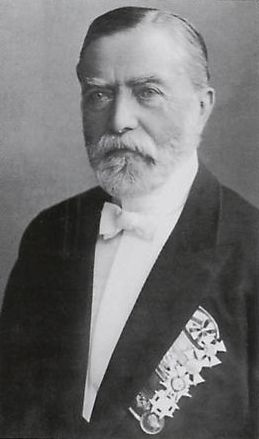
- Sauer c. 1910
- Born: Wilhelm Carl Friedrich Sauer; 23 March 1831; Schönbeck, Grand Duchy of Mecklenburg-Strelitz
- Died: 9 April 1916 (aged 85); Frankfurt (Oder), German Empire
- Occupation: Pipe organ builder

Wilhelm Carl Friedrich Sauer (23 March 1831 – 9 April 1916) was a German pipe organ builder. One of the famous organ builders of the Romantic period, Sauer and his company W. Sauer Orgelbau built over 1,100 organs during his lifetime, amongst them the organs at Bremen Cathedral, Leipzig's St. Thomas Church, and Berlin Cathedral, which is considered to be "his final great masterpiece".

== Early years ==
Wilhelm Sauer was born in Schönbeck, in the Grand Duchy of Mecklenburg-Strelitz, the son of blacksmith and self-educated organ builder Ernst Sauer (1799–1873) from Karlsburg in Pomerania, and his wife Johanna Christine, née Sumke (1800–1882). His parents married in 1822. He was the brother of Johann Ernst Sauer (1823–1842). When Wilhelm was seven years old, the family moved to the neighboring town of Friedland, where his father built a factory and started the commercial organ business. Wilhelm spent his youth there, attending school, with the idea that he would transfer to the Berlin Academy. However, when his older brother Johann died in December 1842, it was decided that Wilhelm would be the one to inherit his father's business and continue the work he had started building organs. Wilhelm received an early education about organ building from his father. He left home in 1848 to further his education in this business, including studying with E.F. Walcker (1851–1853) in Ludwigsburg and with Aristide Cavaillé-Coll in Paris.

== Career ==
In 1855, Sauer took over the management of the German crown branch in his father's factory, which had been opened there for the Prussian market in order to avoid customs duties. On 1 March 1856 Sauer finally opened his own business as Wilhelm Sauer, organ builder in Frankfurt (Oder), which grew quickly with temporary branches in Königsberg (1860). International orders soon followed. By 1882, he had completed 380 organs. In 1883, Sauer was awarded the Distinction of Akademischer Künstler and the following year, on 18 April 1884, he was named by the cabinet as "Royal Organ Builder".

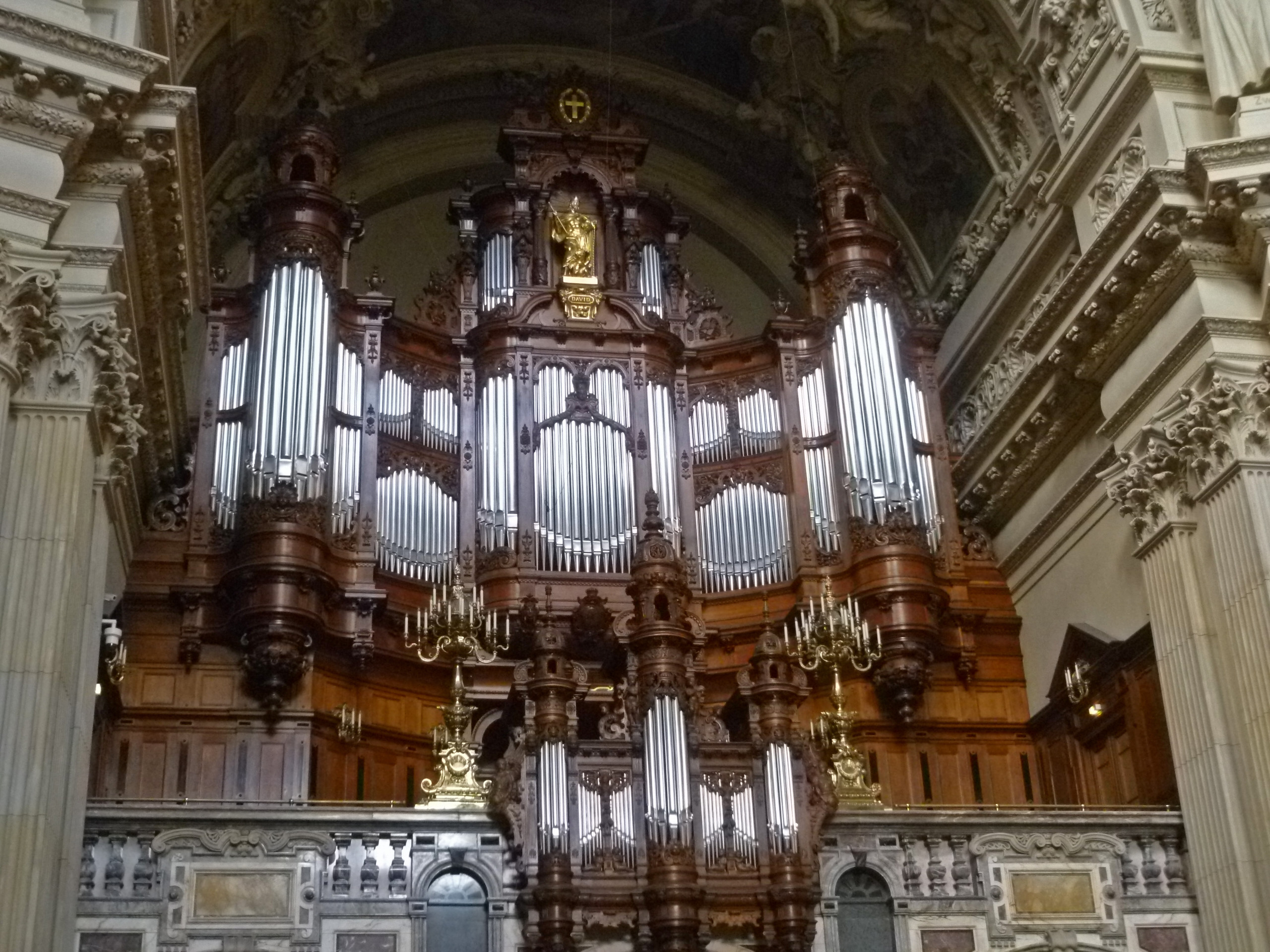
Organ from the Wilhelm Sauer Manufactory in Berlin Cathedral

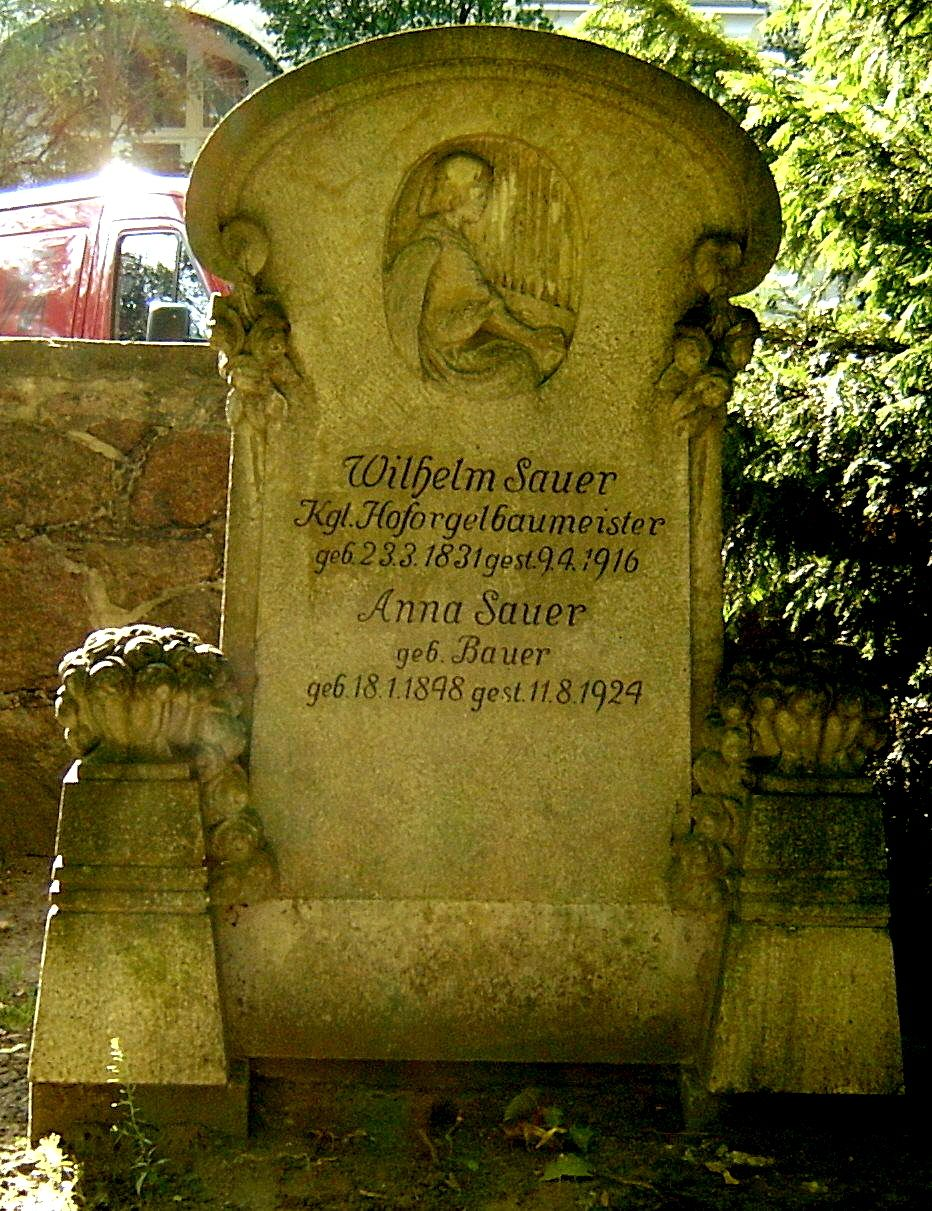
Sauer's tombstone

In his lifetime, Wilhelm Sauer and his staff built more than 1,100 organs. His largest and most famous organs are, amongst others, in Berlin Cathedral (1903, IV/113), Thomaskirche in Leipzig (1888/1908, III/88), and in Görlitz City Hall (1910, IV.72). Two of his 1897 organs are in Namibia: one in Windhoek's Christ Church and another in Swakopmund's Lutheran Church. In 1910, Sauer sold the company to his longtime manager and deputy Paul Walcker, son of E. F. Walcker.

At least 10 of his organs were installed in Latvia.

== Personal life ==
He married Minna Auguste Penske in 1859, the daughter of a cantor, and the couple had a daughter named Johanna (1859–1887). His wife died in 1876. On 7 September 1878, he married his second wife Anna Bauer (18 January 1848 – 11 August 1924). She was the daughter of a brewery owner and member of the city council in Potsdam. They had two sons: Wilhelm (1879–1962) and Franz Gustav Adolf (1883–1945 missing). His grandson, Wolfgang Sauer (1920–1989), went to the United States in 1964 and became a professor of German history at the University of California, Berkeley. Wilhelm Sauer's grave stone is now in Kleistpark in Frankfurt (Oder), where he died.

== Notable works ==
Year	Opus	Place	Church	Photo	Manuals	Registers	Comments
1853		Rechlin-Boek	St Johannis Church		I/P	6	Oldest preserved work by Wilhelm Sauer. Pedalboard and bourdon added by Carl Börger about 1900. Restored by Christian Scheffler 1995–2003.
1864	94	Marienwerder (present-day Kwidzyn)	Cathedral Church		III/P	49	To be restored.
1869	95	Berlin	St Thomas Church		IV/P	52	Damaged by Allied bombing and dismantled in 1944.
1870		Labiau (present-day Polessk)	Town Church				Replaced an older organ by Johann Josua Mosengel; demolished after 1945.
1872	235	Zeschdorf-Döbberin	Village Church		I/P	8	
1874	209	Doberlug-Kirchhain	Dobrilugk Abbey Church		II/P	26	
1879	248	Frankfurt (Oder)	St Gertraud Church		III/P	36	
1883	401	Wernigerode	Church of Our Lady (Liebfrauenkirche)		II/P	30	Baroque organ facade.
1884	419	Lauchhammer-Kostebrau	Village Church		I/P	7	Built for the Protestant Church in Klettwitz, at present location since 1907.
1886		Herne-Eickel	St John's Church (Johanneskirche)		II/P	33	Destroyed by Allied bombing in 1944.
1887	475	Frankfurt-Griesheim	Benediction Church (Segenskirche)		II/P	28	Built for the Protestant Church in Bochum-Laer (demolished in 1974), at present location since 1995.
1888		Göttingen	St Nicolas' Church (University Church)		II/P	23	
1889	501	Leipzig	St Thomas Church		III/P	63	Extended to 88 registers in 1908.
1889	505	Amsterdam	Basilica of St. Nicholas		III/P	40	Two Barker levers.
1890	530	Bad Freienwalde-Bralitz	Village Church		II/P	13	Restored in 2015.
1891	554	Mühlhausen	St. Mary's Church		III/P	61	
1891		Hötensleben-Barneberg	Church of Peace (Friedenskirche)		II/P	19	
1891	557	Jacobsdorf-Sieversdorf	Village Church		I/P	6	
1893	554	Berlin	Garrison Church		III/P	70	Then Berlin's largest church organ. Destroyed by a blaze in 1908.
1893		Berlin	Immanuel Church		II/P	29	
1894	620	Apolda	Luther Church		III/P	47	
1894		Saalfeld	St John's Church (Johanneskirche)		III/P	49	Baroque organ facade. Reconstruction 1932. Restored in 1996.
1894		Bremen	Cathedral		III/P	65	Extended to IV/P/98 in 1926 and 1939.
1895	661	Gehren	St Michael's Church		II/P	23	
1896		Potsdam	Pentecostal Church (Pfingstkirche)		II/P	16	Extended to II/P/28 in 1933. Dismantled in 2011.
1897		Chorin-Golzow	Village Church		II/P	15	Reconstruction 1911. Restored in 1994
1898	731	Wuppertal-Elberfeld	Cemetery Church		II/P	30	Partial renovation 1995
1898	755	Moscow	Sts Peter and Paul Lutheran Cathedral		III/P	33	Built for the St. Michael Lutheran Church in Moscow, at present location since 2005.
1903	891	Bad Harzburg	Luther Church		III/P	40	Originally II/P/29, restored and extended by Christian Scheffler 1997–2001
1905	945	Fulda	Heilig-Geist-Kirche (Church of the Holy Ghost)		II	16	1990, restored to the original version of 1905
1906	981	Neuzelle Abbey	St Mary's Church		II/P	24	Reconstruction by Christian Scheffler, 2001
1907		Kostebrau					
1908		Potsdam	St. Nicholas' Church		III/P	49	Destroyed by Soviet artillery fire in April 1945.
1908		Bad Homburg	Church of the Redeemer				The sound of the "Fernwerk" appears in the above the altar.
1909	1025	Bad Salzungen	Stadtkirche Bad Salzungen		III	41	The organ was built according to the ideas of Max Reger, and restored from 1994 to 2000.
1910		Jerusalem	Augusta Victoria Hospital				The Sauer foot blower is still operational. Unique in the Near East as of 2011.
