= Evangelical Methodist Church, Bydgoszcz =

Evangelical Methodist Church in Bydgoszcz, Poland

Coordinates: 53°07′53″N 18°00′16″E

Evangelical Methodist Church
- Polish: Kościół Ewangelicko-Metodystyczny w Bydgoszczy
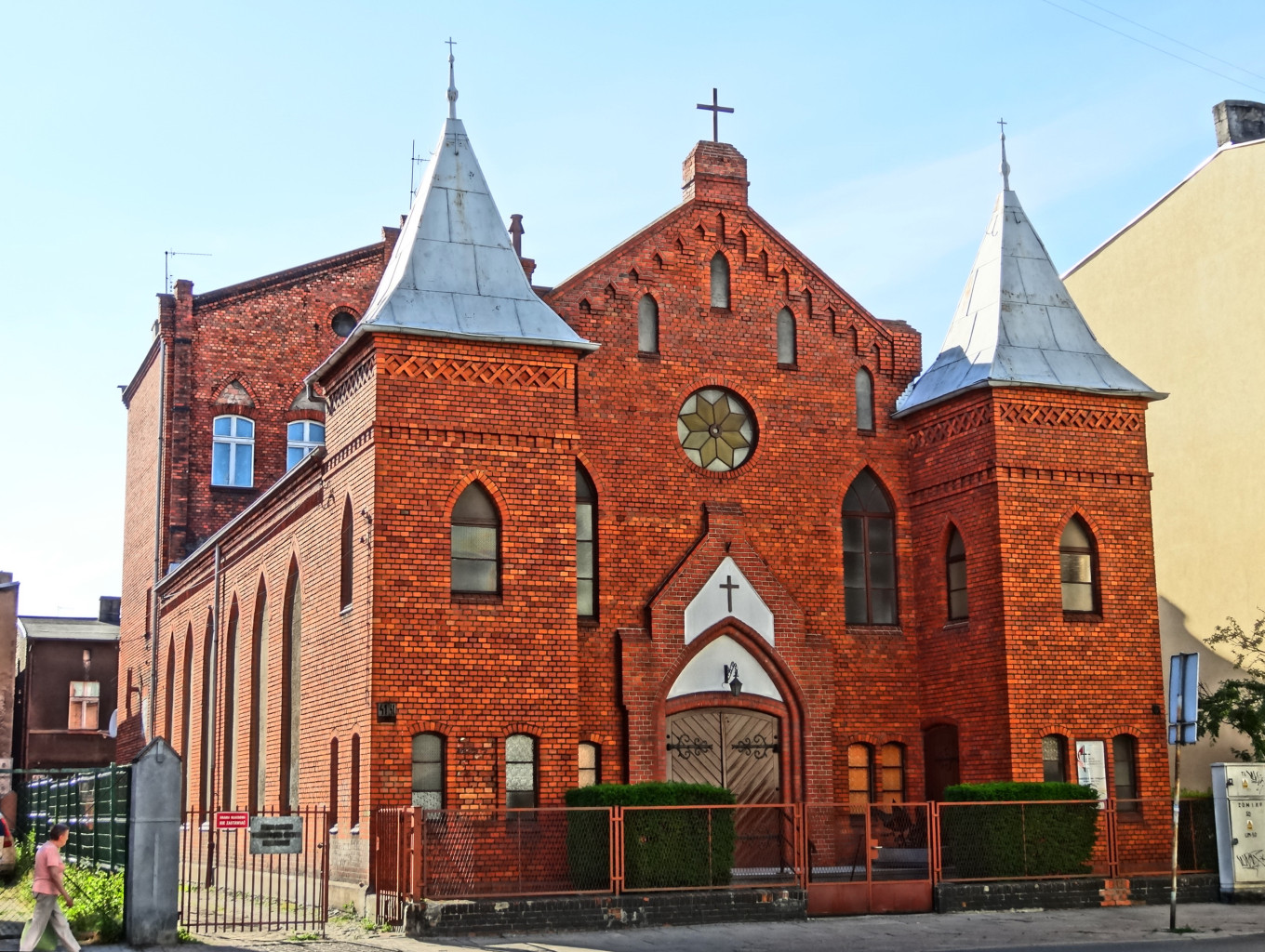
- Evangelical Methodist Church in Bydgoszcz
- Evangelical Methodist Church
- Location: 41 Pomorska street, Bydgoszcz
- Country: Poland
- Denomination: Baptist Church
- Website: https://www.mbkm.pl/archiwum/metodystow.htm

History
- Status: Church
- Dedicated: 1883, November 1968

Architecture
- Functional status: Active
- Heritage designation: Nr.A/805, 16 September 1989
- Architectural type: Neo-Gothic
- Completed: 1883

Specifications
- Materials: Brick

The Evangelical Methodist Church is a 19th century parish church in Bydgoszcz, Poland. It is located at 41 Pomorska Street. The edifice has been registered on the Kuyavian-Pomeranian Voivodeship Heritage list on 16 September 1989.

== History ==
=== Baptist community ===
The building was built in 1883 as a religious and residential complex for the local Baptist congregation. Its architect and designer is unknown. The construction of the church preceded by several decades the laying out of Moltkestraße (today's Cieszkowskiego Street) completed in the early 1900s. Nowadays, the temple closes the western perspective of the street.

Until 1945, the church served primarily a German-speaking Baptist congregation. However, the end of WWII coincided with the dramatic depletion of the Baptist community.

A year later, city authorities assigned the then-abandoned church to the Methodist community in Bydgoszcz.

=== Methodist community ===
This congregation had been active in the town since 1935 but had no specific chapel on their own. The local history of the Methodists dates back to 1922, when the American Southern Methodist Church sent a mission to the Free City of Danzig and the region.

In Bydgoszcz, this mission took the form of a social service (street canteen) established at the intersection of Kościelna Street (today's Magdzińskiego Street) and the Old Market Square. As part of the initiative, volunteers distributed approximately 100 meals a day to the poor.

Once the edifice had been allocated to the Methodist community, it needed an urgent and thorough renovation, as its maintenance had been generally neglected during the war. This happened between 1966 and 1968, thanks to the financial help from the World Council of Churches based in Geneva.

The roof was completely replaced, the interiors were painted afresh and furnished. By and large, the church was modernized according to Protestant architecture features.

The temple was eventually dedicated anew in November 1968, becoming at the time the most modern Methodist edifice in Poland.

== Architecture ==
=== Exteriors ===
The church's exterior exhibs historicist forms, with a predominance of Neo-Gothic components. The chancel consists of a three-nave chapel that externally soars above the temple. To the north-west wing of this back building, a four-storey living area, covered with a low-pitched roof, has been added in the 1960s: it gives onto a courtyard.

The main frontage is characterised by its two lateral towers, topped with pyramidal tented roofs. Pointed-arched windows, elements of tracery and the brick portal reinforce the neo-gothic atmosphere. The large arched windows in the southwestern wall had to be bricked up due to excessive heat loss in winter. Additionally, one can highlight the presence of Italian motifs such as the facade rose window or the brick-based frieze running at the bottom of the gable.

=== Interiors ===
The chapel features an amphitheatrical gallery intended to host the choir, featuring as well a small, eight-voice Sauer organ from 1985.

The chapel's presbytery still houses the preserved baptistery from the Baptist period. Departing from the neo-gothic external style, the internal stocky proportions and large sections of flat, unplastered walls bring the interiors closer to the neo-romanesque architecture. Furthermore, a simple illuminated cross dominates the central nave.

The church's rear area houses a small chapel, which is used for services when attendance is limited. Eventually, the church boasts excellent acoustics.

== See also ==
- Bydgoszcz
- Baptists
- United Methodist Church
- August Cieszkowski Street, Bydgoszcz
- World Council of Churches

== Bibliography ==
- Kuberska, Inga (1998). Architektura sakralna Bydgoszczy w okresie historyzmu. Materiały do dziejów kultury i sztuki Bydgoszczy i regionu. Zeszyt 3 [Bydgoszcz's Religious Architecture in the Historicist Period. Materials for the Cultural and Art History of Bydgoszcz and the Region. Issue 3] (in Polish). Bydgoszcz: Pracownia dokumentacji i popularyzacji zabytków wojewódzkiego ośrodka kultury w Bydgoszczy. pp. 61–82.
- Parucka, Krystyna (2008). Zabytki Bydgoszczy – minikatalog [Monuments of Bydgoszcz – mini catalogue] (in Polish). Bydgoszcz: „Tifen” Krystyna Parucka.
- Szach, Jerzy; Vogel, Tadeusz (1983). Bydgoskie świątynie. Kalendarz Bydgoski [Bydgoszcz temples. Bydgoszcz calendar] (in Polish). Bydgoszcz: Towarzystwo Miłośników Miasta Bydgoszczy. pp. 42–52.
