= Hugo Kaufmann =

German sculptor

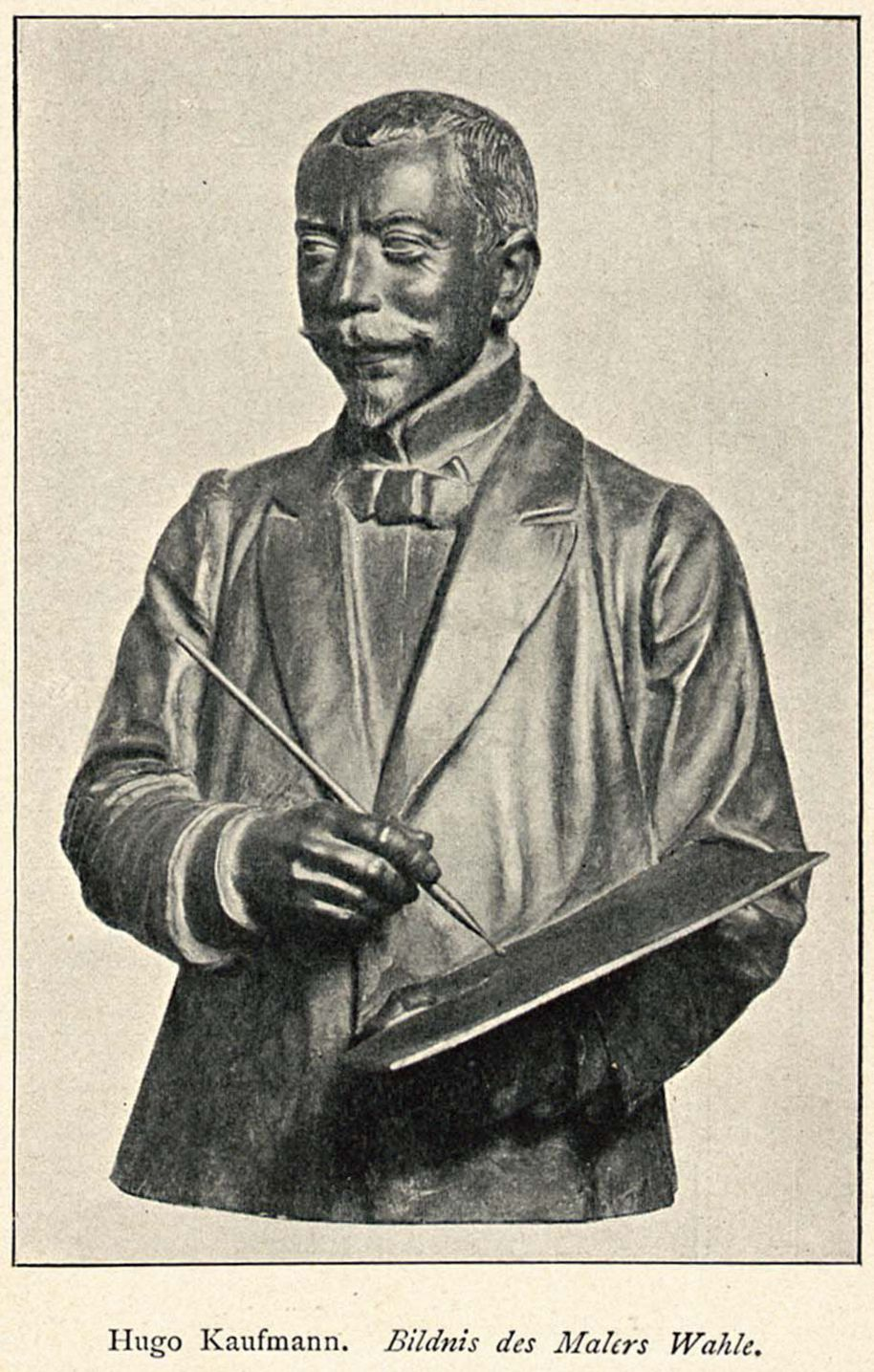
Portrait of the Painter Friedrich Wahle by Hugo Kaufmann

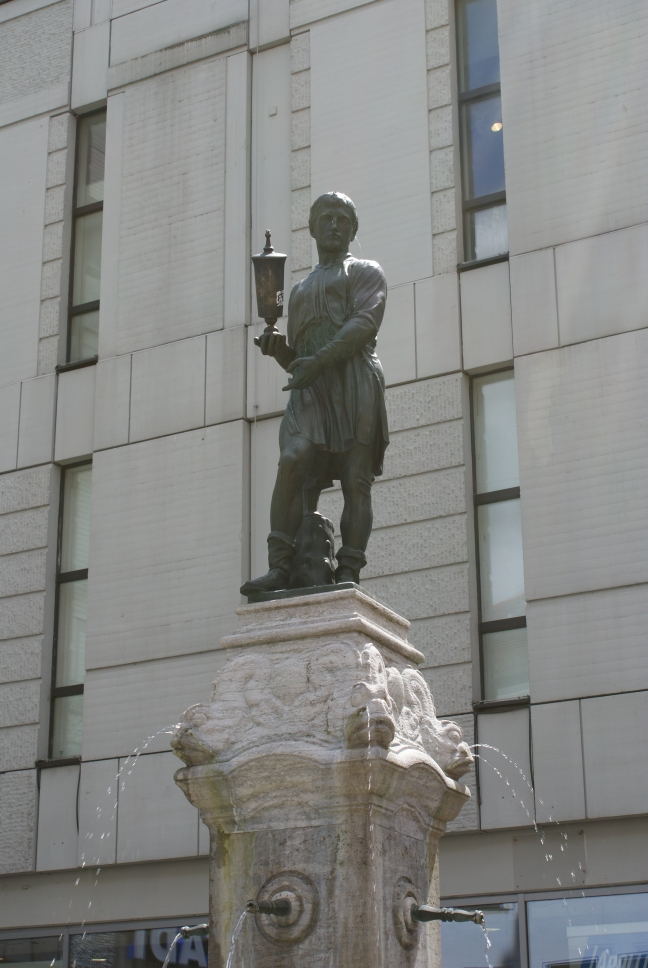
Goldsmith monument, Martin-Luther-Platz, Augsburg

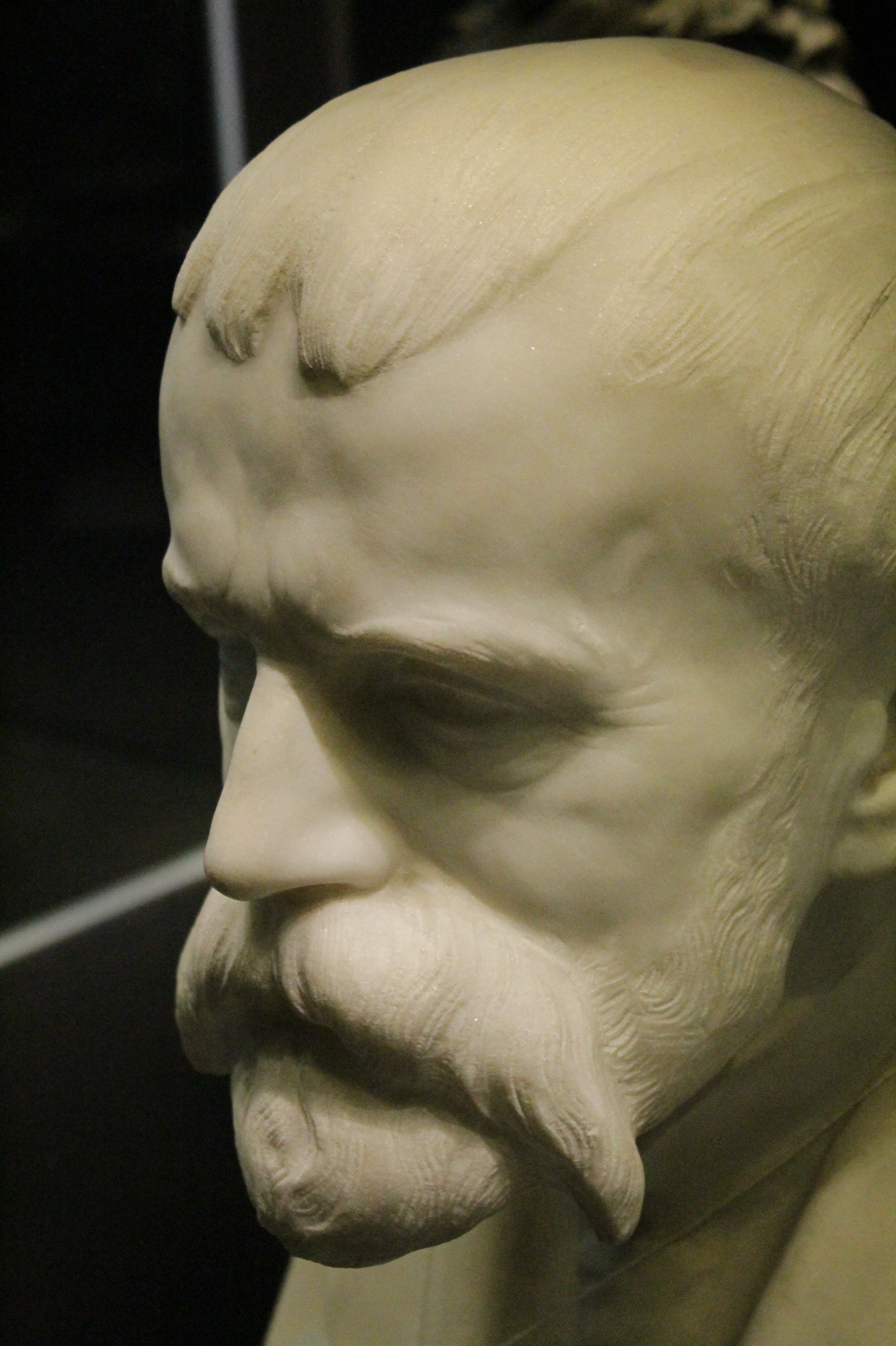
Fritz von Uhde by Hugo Kaufmann, Albertinum, Dresden 1908

Hugo Kaufmann (1868–1919) was a 19th/20th-century German sculptor who created many public statues and memorials. He was also a competent artist in oils but is less known in this field.

== Life ==
He was born in Scots on 29 June 1868 to a Jewish family from Vogelsbergkreis.

He attended drawing classes in Hanau from in 1884 then attended the trade school in Frankfurt-am-Main, then studied in the Stadel Art School under Gustav Kaupert. From 1888 he studied at the Academy of Fine Arts in Munich under Wilhelm von Rumann.

Staying in Munich he became Professor of Art in 1904. In 1907 he went to Berlin but returned to Munich in 1917. He was a member of the Deutscher Kuenstlerbund.

He died in Munich on 14 May 1919.

== Public works ==
see

- Allegorical figures on Ludwigsbrucke in Munich (1894) destroyed during the Second World War
- Sculpture on insurance office, 10 Cardinal Faulhaber Str. Munich (1895)
- Goethe medal (1899)
- Merkurbrunnen, Munich (1902)
- Monument to the Champions of German Unity, Paulsplatz, Frankfurt-am-Main (1903)
- Figures of Power and Unity, Bavarian State Chancellery (1905)
- Christopher the Strong, on the New Town Hall in Marienplatz, Munich (1908)
- Goldsmith monument, Martin-Luther-Platz, Augsburg (1912)
