= Friedrich Adler (architect) =

German architect and archaeologist

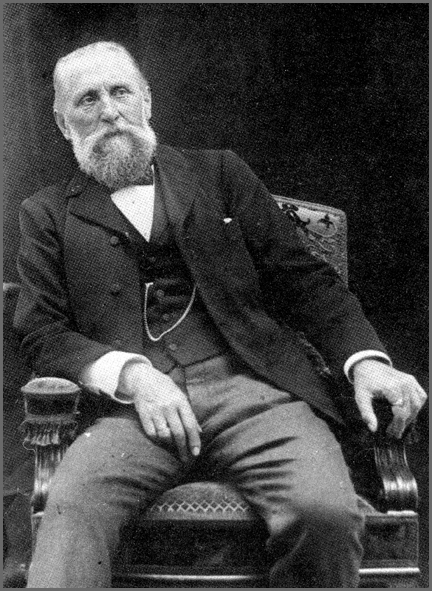
- Friedrich Adler (1897), photograph by Paul Graef
- Born: October 15, 1827; Berlin
- Died: September 15, 1908 (aged 80); Berlin
- Occupations: Architect, Archaeologist
- Years active: 19th Century
- Known for: Church architecture, Olympia excavations

Academic background
- Education: Bauakademie (Academy of Architecture)

Academic work
- Discipline: Architecture, archaeology
- Sub-discipline: Architectural History, Classical Archaeology
- Institutions: Bauakademie (Academy of Architecture)
- Main interests: Antique architecture, Church architecture, Archaeological excavation
- Notable works: Olympia excavations, Church buildings

Friedrich Adler (15 October 1827 – 15 September 1908) was a German architect and archaeologist.

After having studied at the Bauakademie (Academy of Architecture) in his native Berlin, he began teaching there in 1855, and was soon famous for building churches. In 1863, he was named a professor of architectural history at the academy.

Due to his profound knowledge of antique architecture, he took part of Ernst Curtius' archaeological expedition to Asia Minor.

He was part of the leading directory of the major excavations in Olympia (1874–81), and took part in the planning of the whole enterprise, which was at first scheduled to last no more than five years. At one point, he was even leader of the excavations. He was also the editor, together with Ernst Curtius, of the publication of the excavations report.

Adler died in his home city of Berlin, aged 80.

== Archaeological works (as co-editor, together with Ernst Curtius) ==
- "Olympia: die Ergebnisse der von dem Deutschen Reich veranstalteten Ausgrabung" (Olympia, Results of the Excavation). Tome I-V (1890–1897).
- "Olympia und Umgegend" (Olympia and its surroundings); (2 maps and a plan, drawn by Adler's son-in-law Wilhelm Dörpfeld and Johann August Kaupert; 1882).

== Architectural works ==
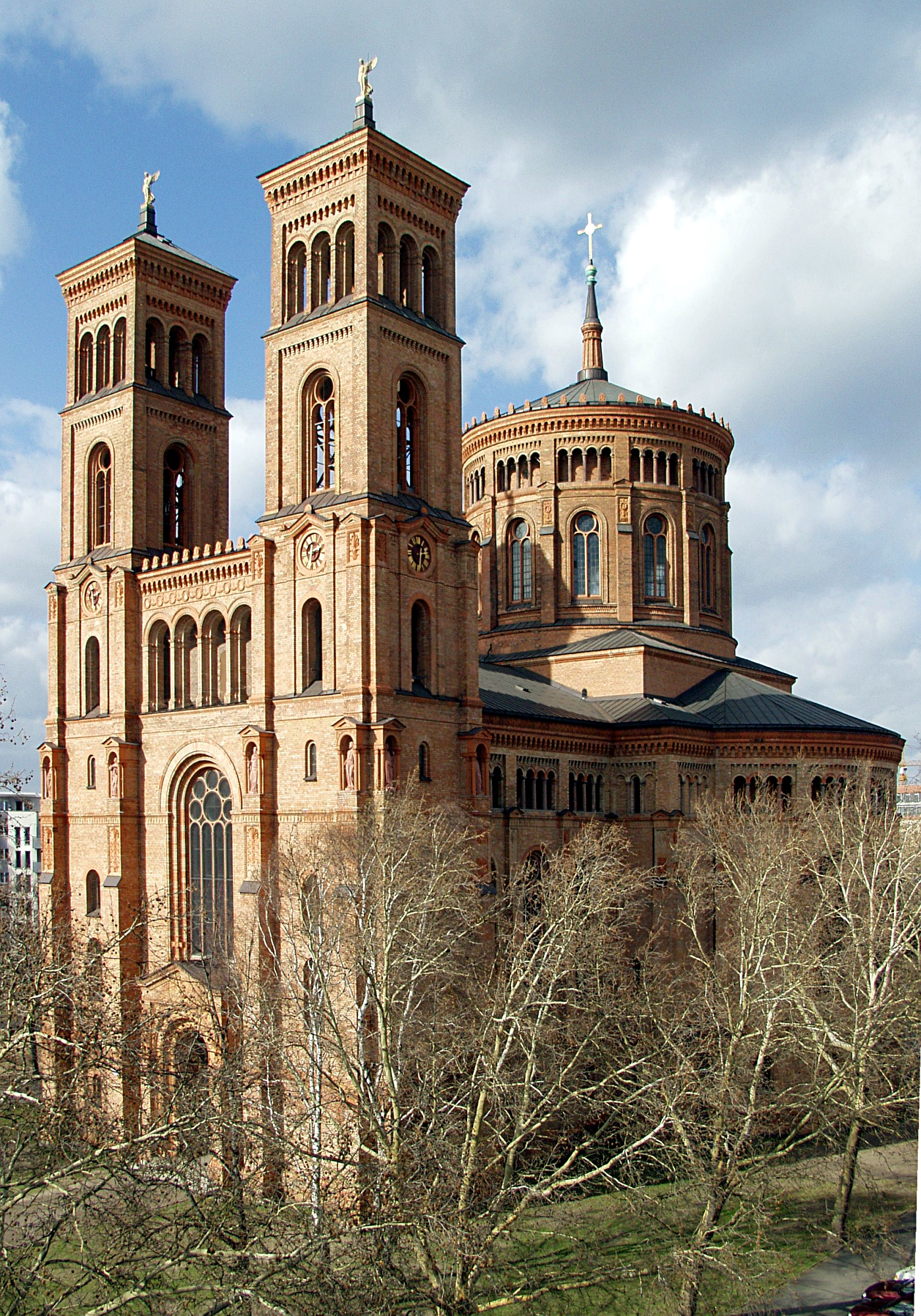
Saint Thomas Church, Berlin.

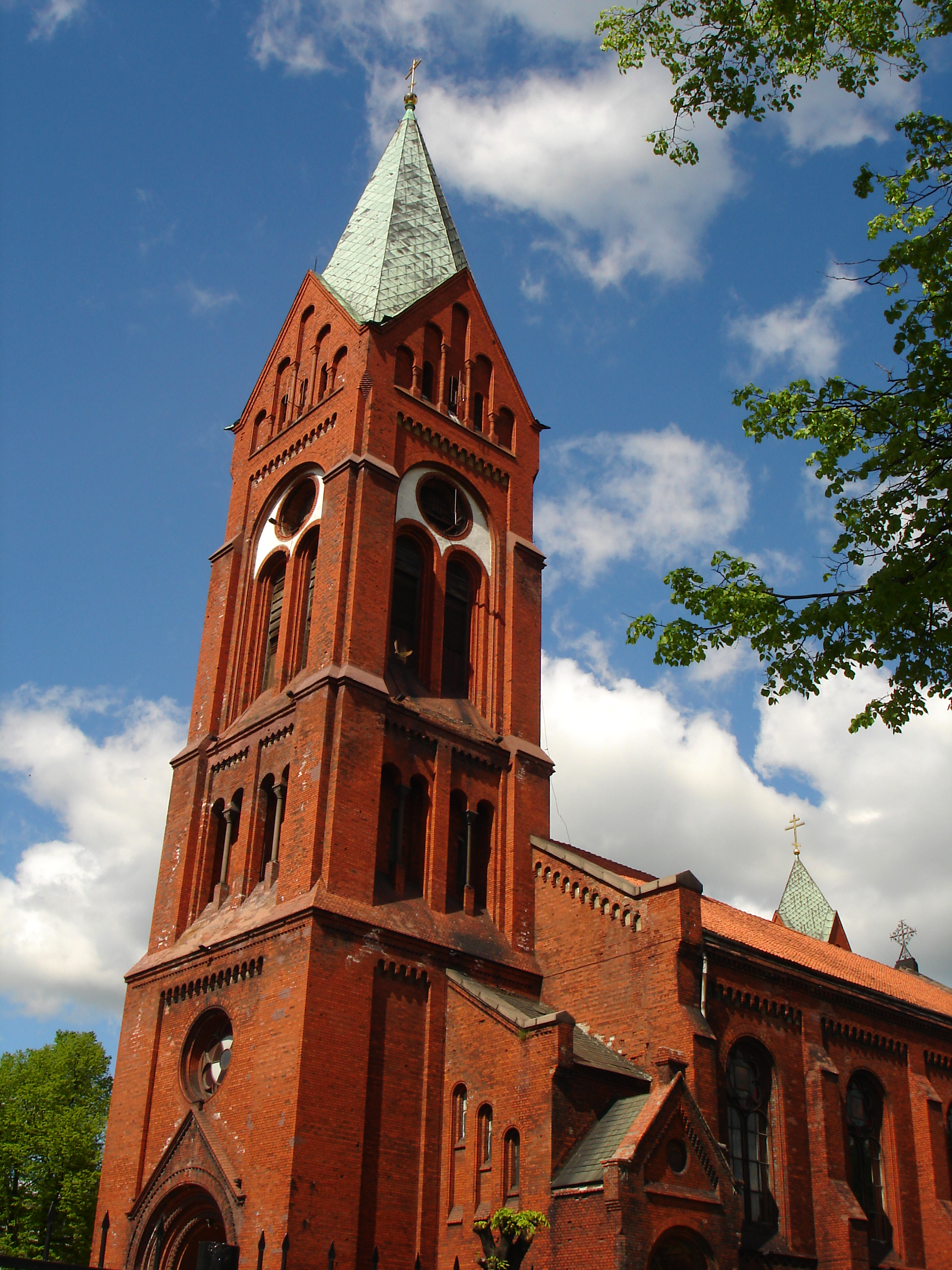
Former Calvinist Church, today's Russian Orthodox Cathedral of Saint Michael Archangel, Chernyakhovsk

Adler designed and built many structures, among them 300 churches, some villas, castles and manor houses, holiday resorts, urban residential buildings etc.

- Lutheran St. Peter's Church, Berlin, as master builder for Heinrich Strack as of 1850 (destroyed in WW II)
- Babelsberg Palace, Potsdam, as master builder for Heinrich Strack as of 1850
- Lutheran Village Church, Gräben, as architect, refurbish, as of 1855
- Lutheran Christ Church, Berlin, as architect between 1862 and 1865 (destroyed in WW II)
- Lutheran Saint Thomas Church (Berlin), as architect between 1865 and 1869 (severely damaged in WW II, rebuilt)
- Meyenburg Castle as architect, refurbished in 1865/1866
- Lutheran Christ and Garrison Church, Wilhelmshaven, as architect between 1869 and 1872 (severely damaged in WW II, rebuilt)
- Lutheran St. Peter's Church, Bromberg (today's Bydgoszcz), as architect between 1872 and 1878 (converted into Catholic Sts. Peter and Paul Church on 2 July 1945)
- Lutheran Redeemer Church, Jerusalem, as architect, built after his designs by his pupil Paul Ferdinand Groth between 1893 and 1898
- Lutheran St. James Church, Luckenwalde
- Lutheran Village Church, Atzendorf (a part of today's Staßfurt)
- Lutheran St. Nicholas Church, Frankfurt upon Oder, as architect he designed and added a new double-towered façade
- Lutheran Church, Schwetz (today's Świecie)
- Calvinist Church, Insterburg (today's Chernyakhovsk)
- Lutheran Castle Church of All Saints, Wittenberg, as architect he directed the intrusive renovation between 1883 and 1892
- Lutheran St. Peter's Cathedral, Schleswig, as architect he designed and added a new western main tower between 1888 and 1894
- Catholic St. Peter's Collegiate Church, Bad Wimpfen, as architect he renovated the church and designed and completed the unaccomplished towers between 1898 and 1902.
