= Wackersleben =

- Ortsteil of Hötensleben
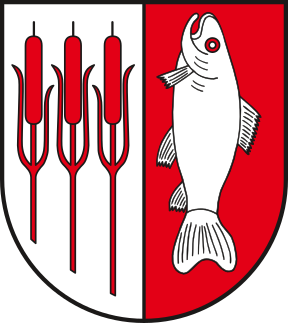
- Coat of arms
- Interactive map of Wackersleben
- Location within Germany Location within Saxony-Anhalt
- Coordinates: 52°4′N 11°1′E
- Country: Germany
- State: Saxony-Anhalt
- District: Börde
- Municipality: Hötensleben

Area
  - Total: 15.85 km^{2} (6.12 sq mi)
- Elevation: 82 m (269 ft)

Population (2006-12-31)
  - Total: 723
  - Density: 45.6/km^{2} (118/sq mi)
- Time zone: UTC+01:00 (CET)
  - Summer (DST): UTC+02:00 (CEST)
- Postal codes: 39393
- Dialling codes: 039401

Wackersleben is a village and a former municipality in the Börde district in Saxony-Anhalt, Germany. Since 2 January 2010, it is part of the municipality Hötensleben.
