= Paul Walcker =

German organ builder (1846–1928)

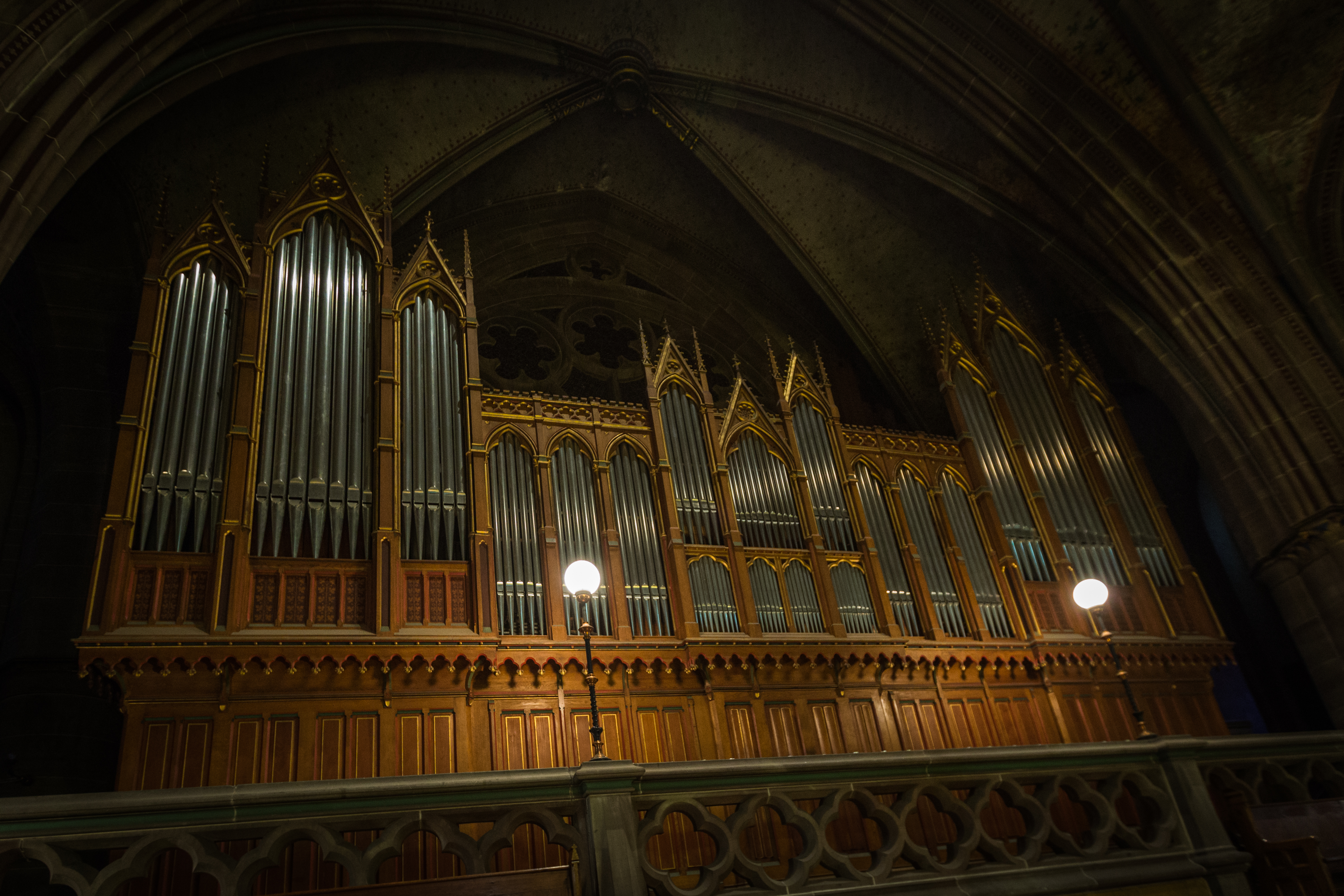
- Walcker organ at the Church of Saint Paul in Strasbourg
- Born: May 31, 1846; Ludwigsburg, Baden-Württemberg, Germany
- Died: June 6, 1928 (aged 82)
- Occupation: Pipe organ builder

Paul Walcker (May 31, 1846 – June 6, 1928 ) was a German pipe organ builder.

== Biography ==
Born in Ludwigsburg, Baden-Württemberg, Germany, he was a son of the notable organ builder Eberhard Friedrich Walcker (1794-1872) and his second wife Marie Stumpp. He studied musical style and architecture at the University of Stuttgart. In 1864, he apprenticed with his father and worked on the organs of the Reformed Churches in Mulhouse, France and Glarus, Switzerland, as well as the German Reformed Church in Saint Petersburg, Russia. In 1886, Walcker and his four brothers Eberhard Heinrich (1828-1903), Friedrich (1829-1895), Karl (1845-1908) and Eberhard (1850-1928) founded the Ludwigsburg Organ Company. An argument in 1892 with the Wilhelm Sauer Organ Company required the mediation of Alexander Wilhelm Gottschalg. In the spring of 1894, Walcker became the managing director and official representative of William Sauer, and in 1910, Sauer retired, selling the company to Walcker, who ran the company until 1917 when he sold the Walcker Sauer Company to his nephew, Oscar Walcker (1869 -1948), head of the Walcker organ company in Ludwigsburg.

Walcker was award the Order of the Crown for the organ in the Berlin Cathedral and the Order of the Red Eagle IV Class for the organ at Wrocław's Centennial Hall. His son, Paul Walcker Jr., was government architect and engineer in electrical engineering.

== See also ==
- Walcker Orgelbau
