= Castle Meyenburg =

- (Schloss Meyenburg)
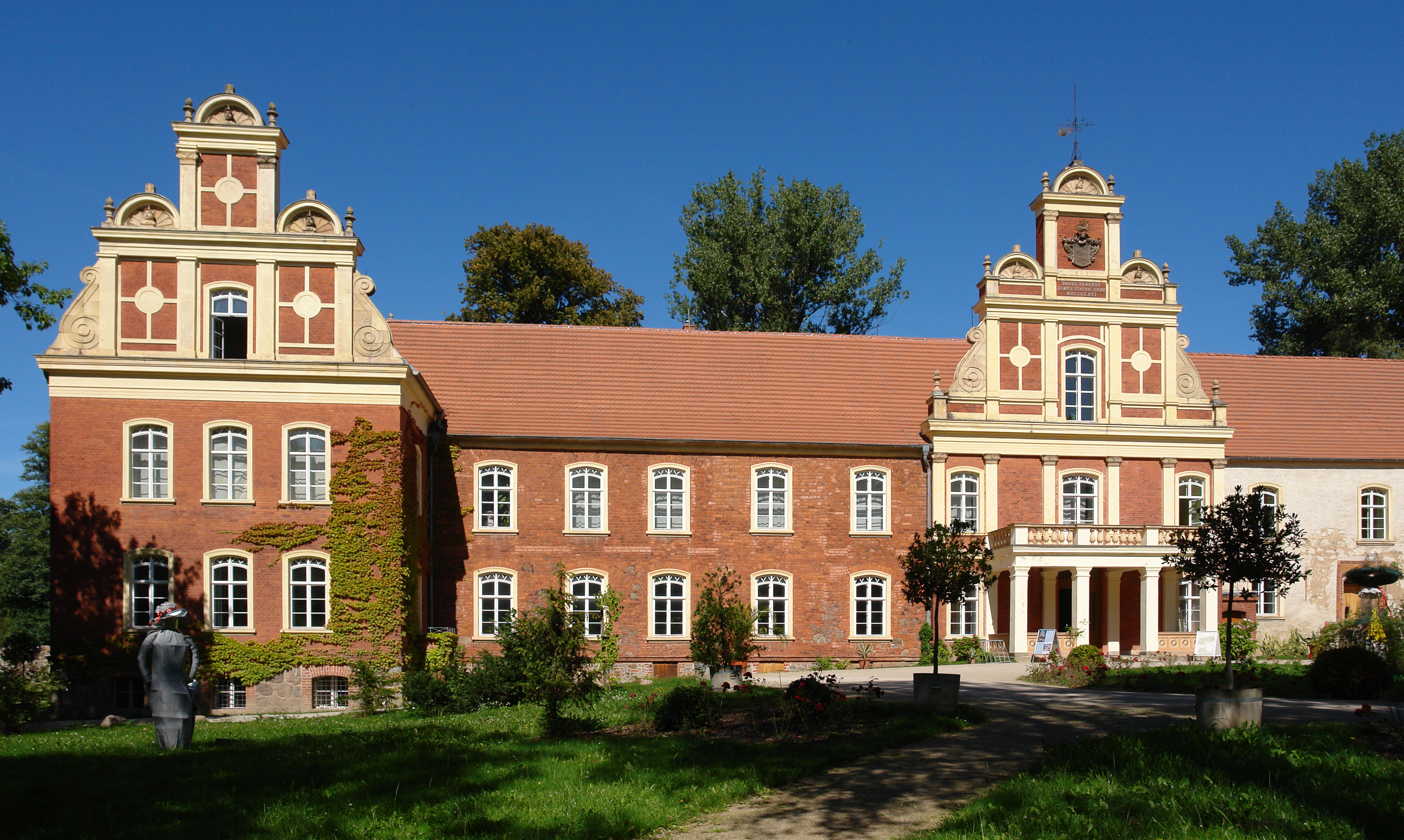
- Schloss Meyenburg

- Location within Germany

General information
- Location: Meyenburg, Germany
- Coordinates: 53.31638°N 12.24291°E

Renovating team
- Architect: Friedrich Adler

Castle Meyenburg is in Meyenburg and was built by the Von Rohrs. It was built in the 14th century and currently houses a fashion museum and a room devoted to the history of the Von Rohrs. The structure was renovated and developed by the architect Friedrich Adler in the 19th century.
