= Johann August Kaupert =

German topographer and cartographer

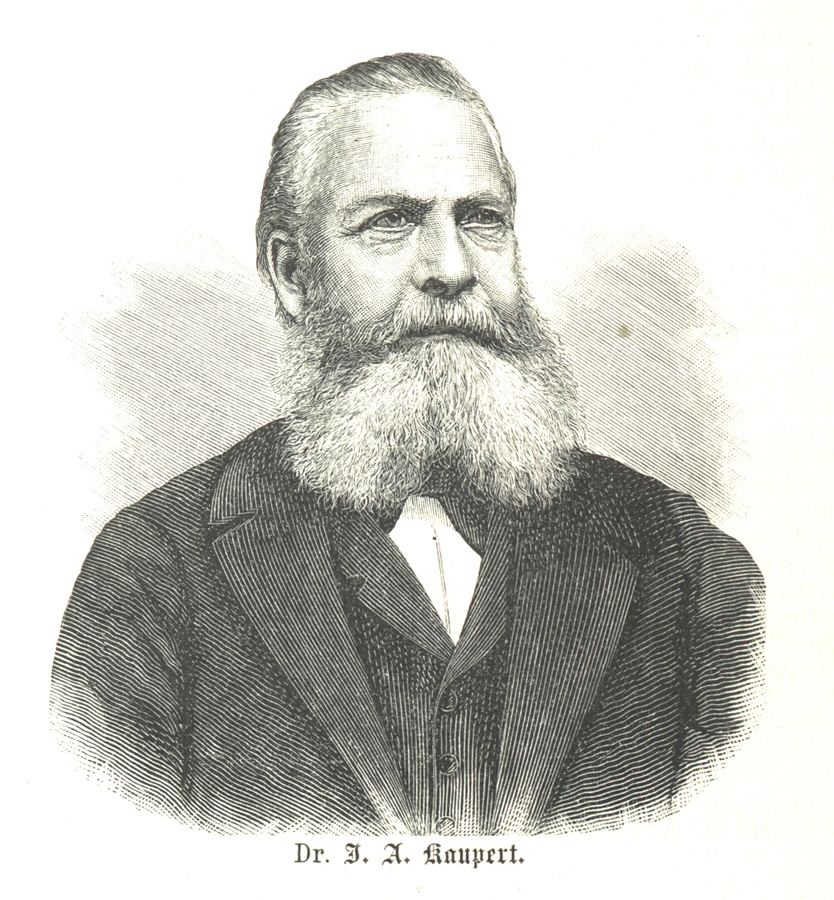
Johann August Kaupert

Johann August Kaupert (9 May 1822 – 11 February 1899) was a German topographer and cartographer born in Kassel. He was a younger brother to sculptor Gustav Kaupert (1819–1897).

Kaupert was educated in Kassel, and from 1841 worked for a Kurhessian topographical land-surveying unit based in Kassel. In 1860, through mediation by cartographer Emil von Sydow, he joined the topographical surveying division of the Prussian General Staff. In 1869, he was named conductor of the topographical surveying division of the General Staff in Berlin.

In 1875 and 1877, he worked with archaeologist Ernst Curtius (1814–1896) in Greece on behalf of the Deutsches Archäologisches Institut (German Archaeological Institute). Here he conducted topographical investigations of Athens and surrounding areas. He collaborated with Curtius on the creation of Atlas von Athen (1878) and the acclaimed Karten von Attika (Charts of Attica), (1881–1903). With Curtius and Friedrich Adler, he published Olympia und Umgegend (Olympia and its environs, 1882).

In 1889, Kaupert was awarded with an honorary doctorate from the University of Strasbourg.
