= Meyenburg =

- Town
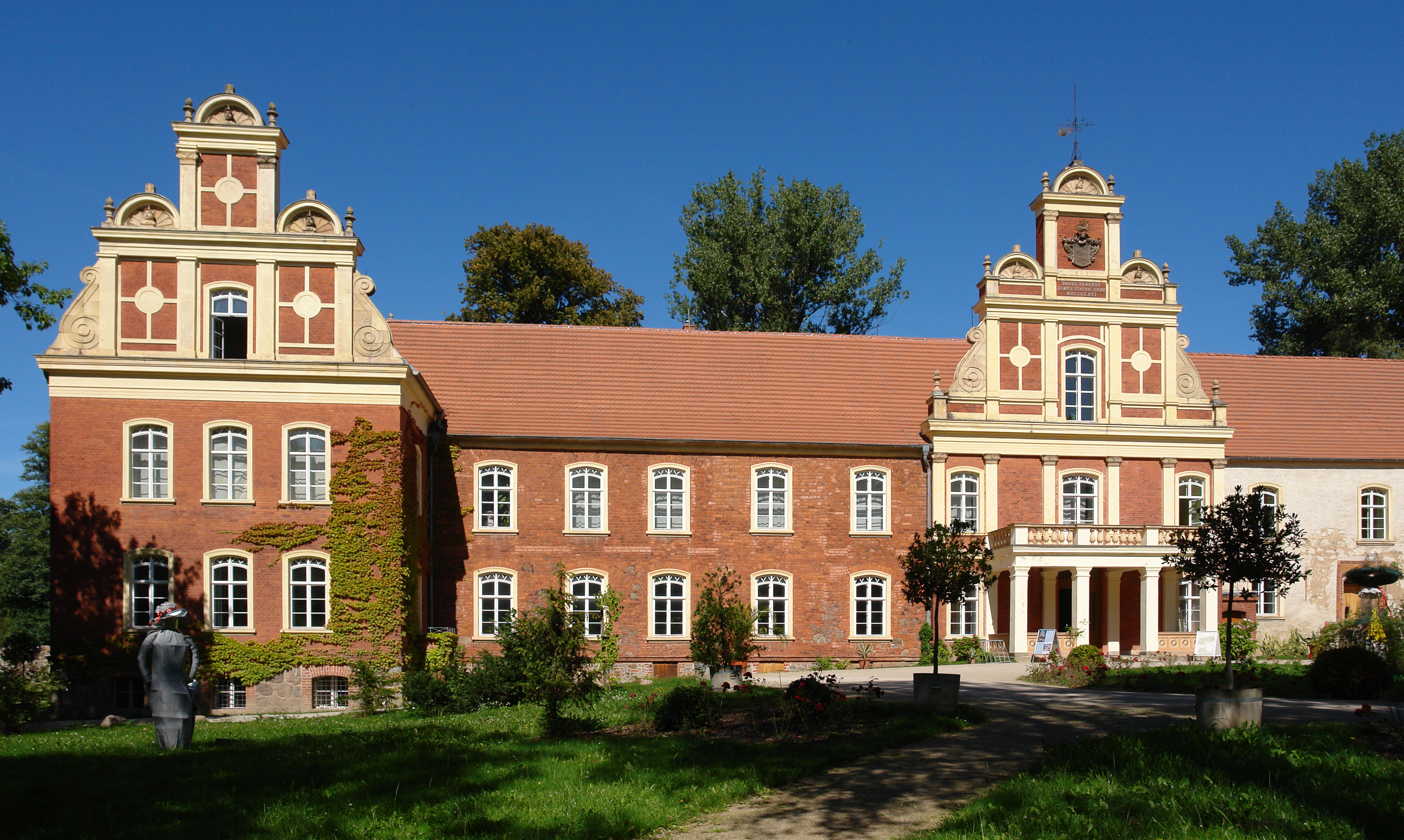
- Meyenburg Castle

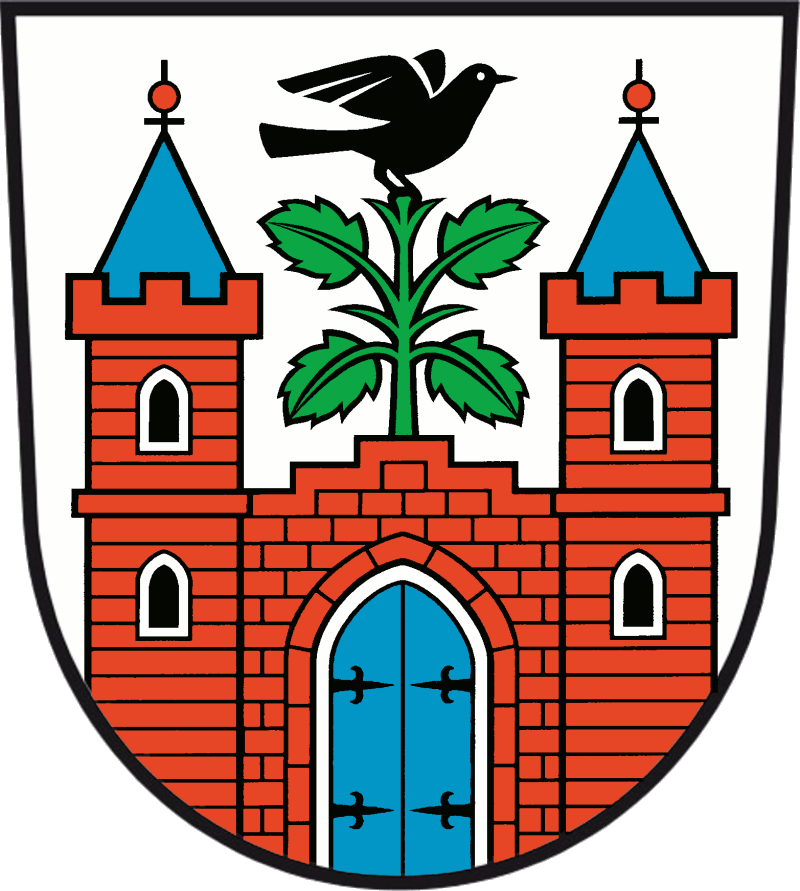
- Coat of arms

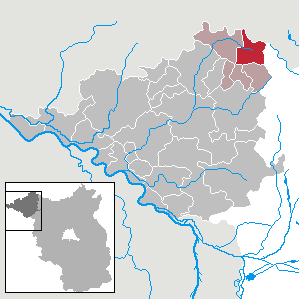
- Location of Meyenburg within Prignitz district
- Interactive map of Meyenburg
- Location within Germany Location within Brandenburg
- Coordinates: 53°19′00″N 12°13′59″E
- Country: Germany
- State: Brandenburg
- District: Prignitz
- Municipal assoc.: Meyenburg

Government
  - Mayor (2024–29): Falko Krassowski

Area
  - Total: 50.74 km^{2} (19.59 sq mi)
- Elevation: 82 m (269 ft)

Population (2025-12-31)
  - Total: 2,008
  - Density: 39.57/km^{2} (102.5/sq mi)
- Time zone: UTC+01:00 (CET)
  - Summer (DST): UTC+02:00 (CEST)
- Postal codes: 16945
- Dialling codes: 033968
- Vehicle registration: PR
- Website: www.meyenburg.de

Meyenburg (German: [ˈmaɪənbʊʁk]) is a town in the district of Prignitz, in Brandenburg, Germany. It is situated 23 km northwest of Wittstock, and 18 km northeast of Pritzwalk. It is located on the banks of the Stepenitz River.

== History ==
The first time Meyenburg was mentioned in official documents was in 1285. Meyenburg obtained municipal status around 1300. Most of the houses burnt down in 1795 and were rebuilt afterwards. From 1815 to 1945, Meyenburg was part of the Prussian Province of Brandenburg. From 1952 to 1990, it was part of the Bezirk Potsdam of East Germany.

== Sights ==
Meyenburg is famous for Meyenburg Castle which is surrounded by a park created in 1860. Several half-timbered houses which were built after 1795 can be visited, e. g. in Wallstraße and Grünstraße. A part of the medieval city wall with two towers is preserved in the north of the centre. The Protestant Church has a nave dating from 1749 and a bell tower which was built in a neogothic style from 1848 to 1850. Various buildings built in the Gründerzeit style are preserved as well, e.g. the Town Hall and the Post Office.

== Infrastructure ==
Meyenburg has a railway station on the Pritzwalk-Meyenburg railway which was inaugurated in 1897.

== Demography ==
Changes in Population since 1875 within the Current Boundaries (Blue Line: Population; Dotted Line: Comparison to Population Changes of Brandenburg state; Grey Background: Nazi period; Orange Background: Communist period

Meyenburg: Population development
within the current boundaries (2013)

| Year | Pop. | ±% p.a. |
|---|---|---|
| 1875 | 2,052 | — |
| 1890 | 2,434 | +1.14% |
| 1910 | 2,836 | +0.77% |
| 1925 | 3,185 | +0.78% |
| 1933 | 3,301 | +0.45% |
| 1939 | 3,249 | −0.26% |
| 1946 | 5,022 | +6.42% |
| 1950 | 4,898 | −0.62% |
| 1964 | 3,800 | −1.80% |
| 1971 | 3,746 | −0.20% |
| 1981 | 3,330 | −1.17% |
| 1985 | 3,317 | −0.10% |
| 1989 | 3,168 | −1.14% |
| 1990 | 3,094 | −2.34% |
| 1991 | 2,974 | −3.88% |
| 1992 | 2,949 | −0.84% |
| 1993 | 2,940 | −0.31% |
| 1994 | 2,930 | −0.34% |
| 1995 | 2,928 | −0.07% |
| 1996 | 2,877 | −1.74% |

| Year | Pop. | ±% p.a. |
|---|---|---|
| 1997 | 2,874 | −0.10% |
| 1998 | 2,850 | −0.84% |
| 1999 | 2,768 | −2.88% |
| 2000 | 2,724 | −1.59% |
| 2001 | 2,717 | −0.26% |
| 2002 | 2,663 | −1.99% |
| 2003 | 2,586 | −2.89% |
| 2004 | 2,543 | −1.66% |
| 2005 | 2,506 | −1.45% |
| 2006 | 2,497 | −0.36% |
| 2007 | 2,475 | −0.88% |
| 2008 | 2,403 | −2.91% |
| 2009 | 2,344 | −2.46% |
| 2010 | 2,305 | −1.66% |
| 2011 | 2,243 | −2.69% |
| 2012 | 2,203 | −1.78% |
| 2013 | 2,156 | −2.13% |
| 2014 | 2,131 | −1.16% |
| 2015 | 2,124 | −0.33% |
| 2016 | 2,126 | +0.09% |

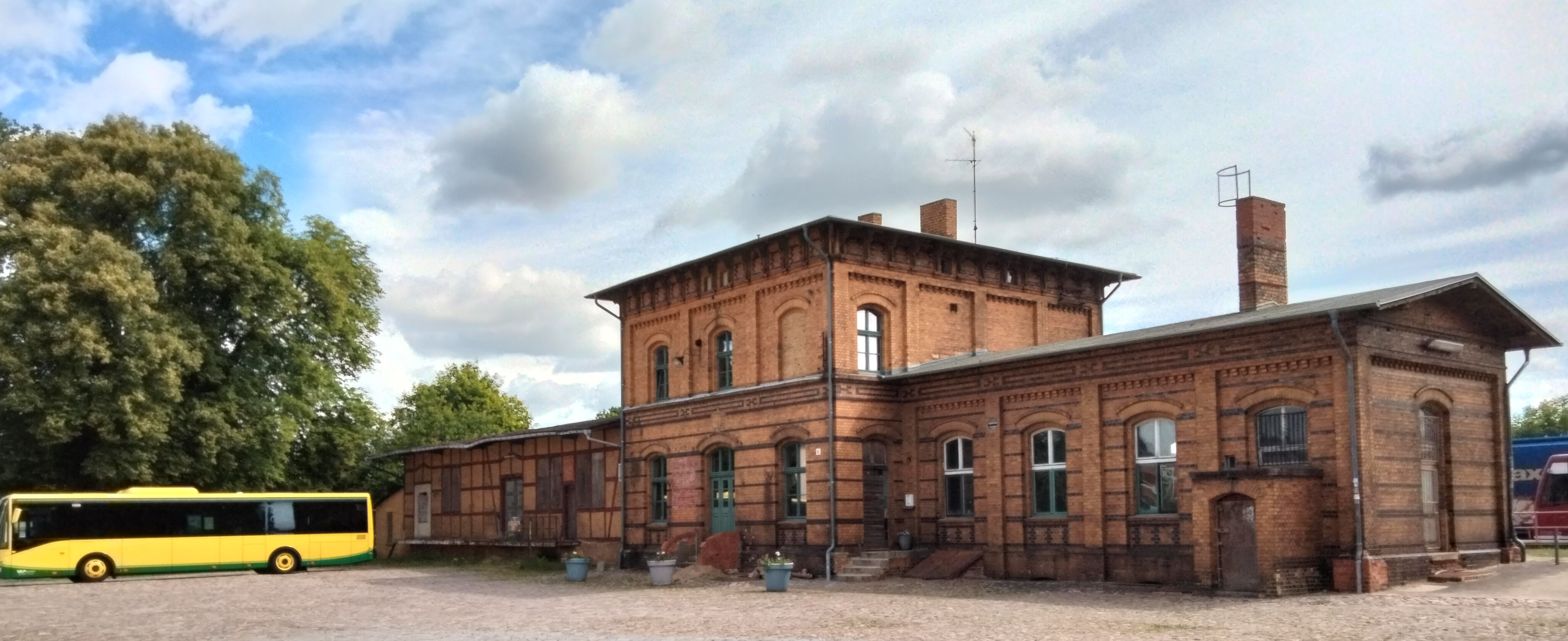
Railway Station

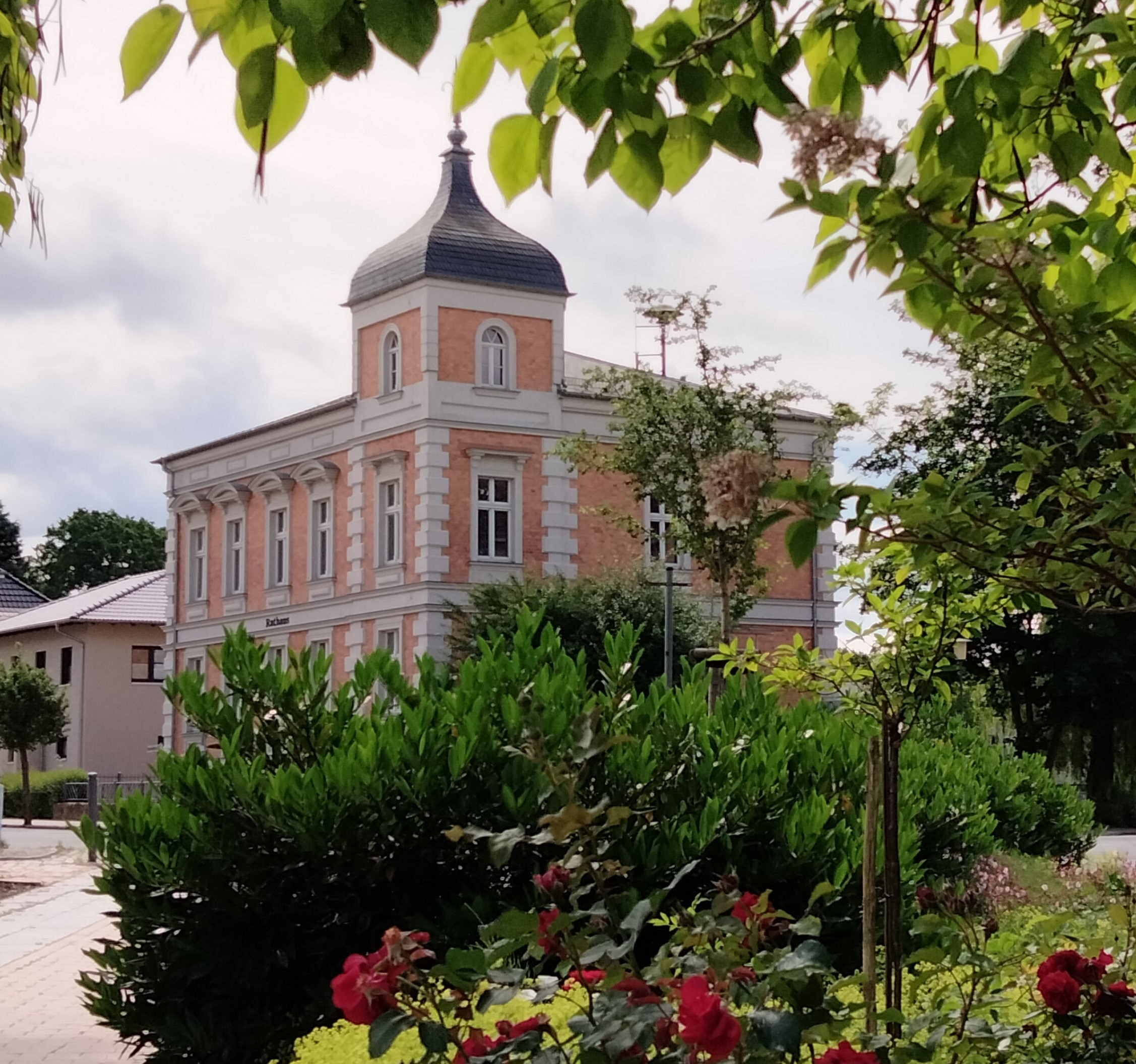
Town Hall

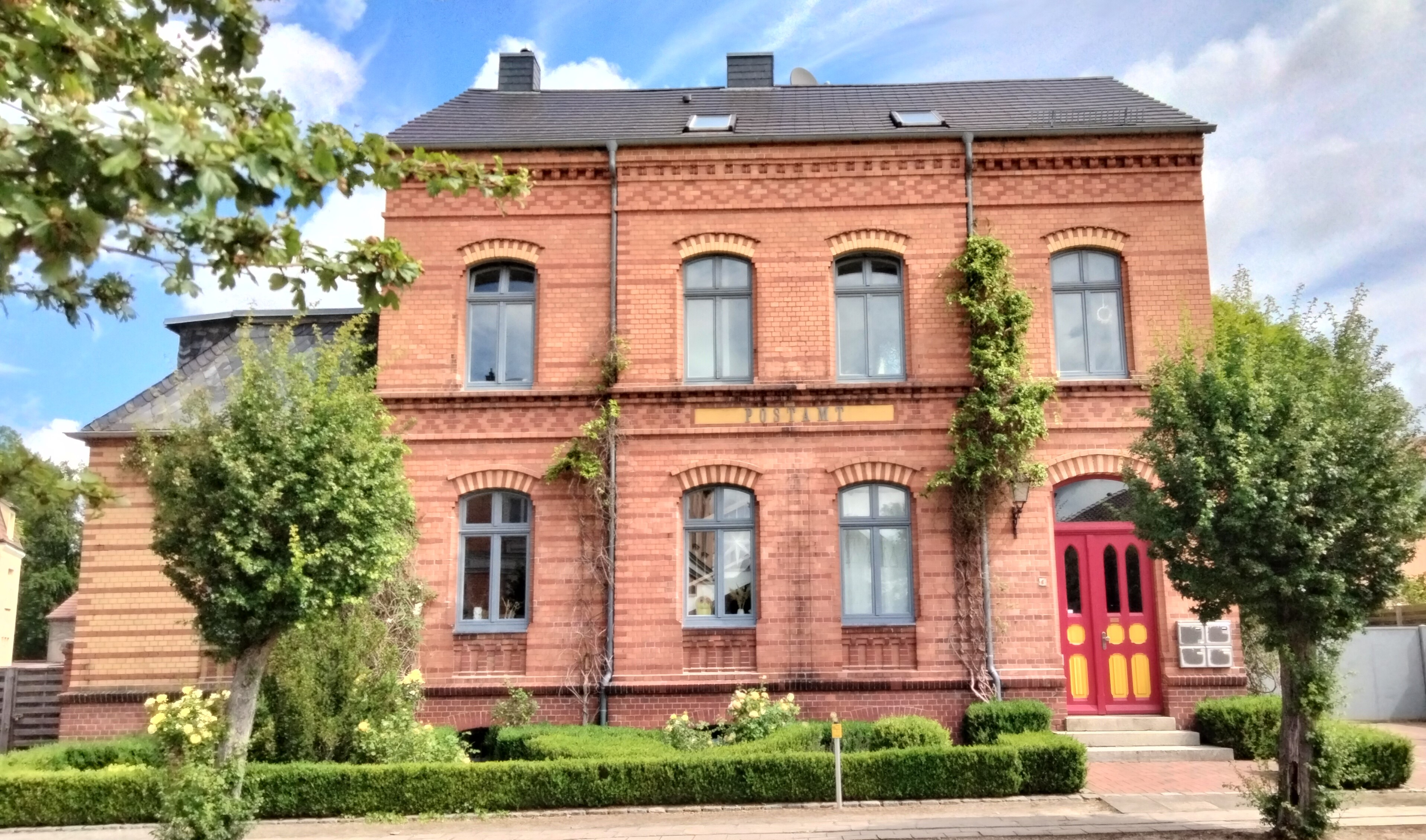
Post Office

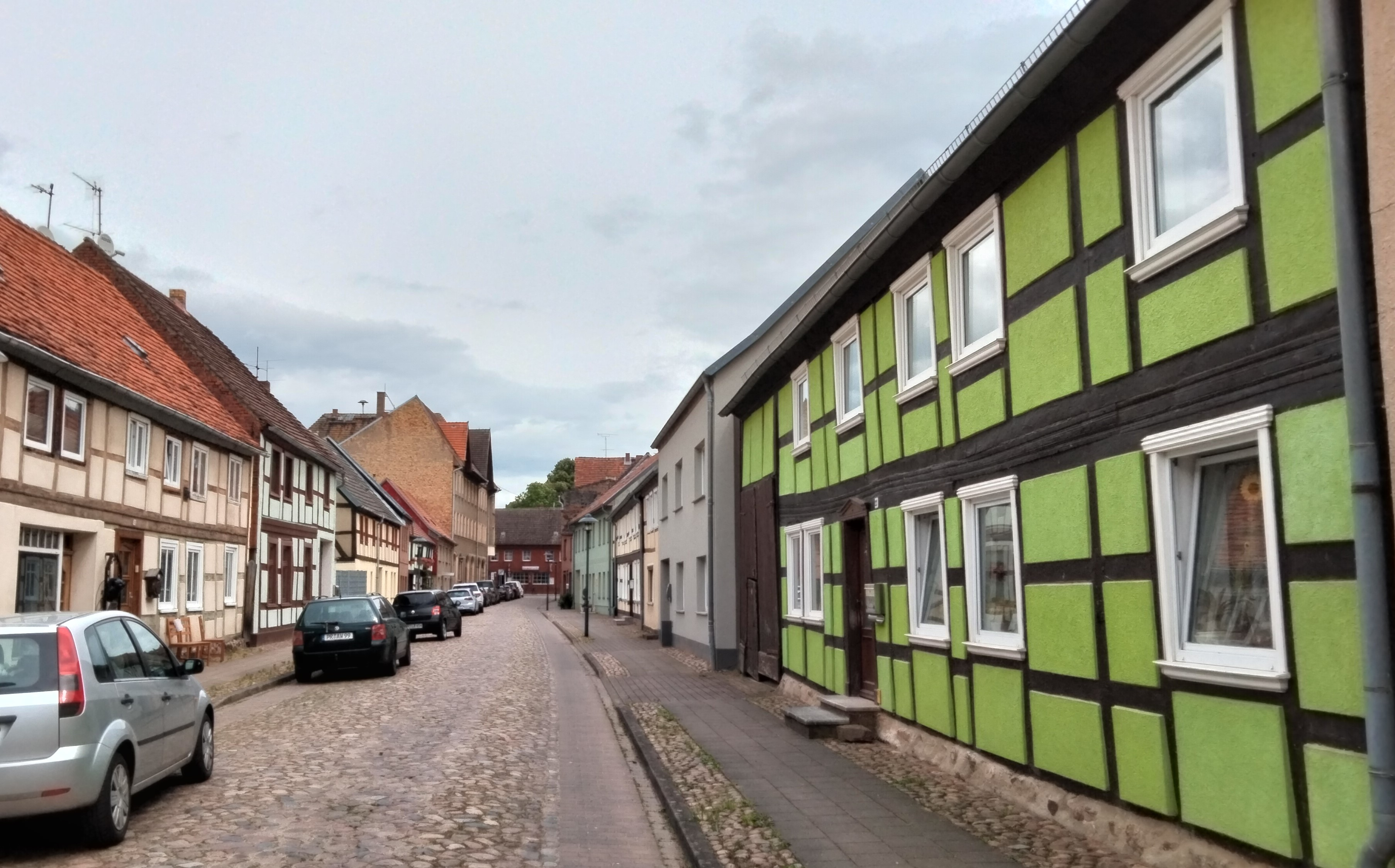
Half-timbered houses in Gruenstrasse

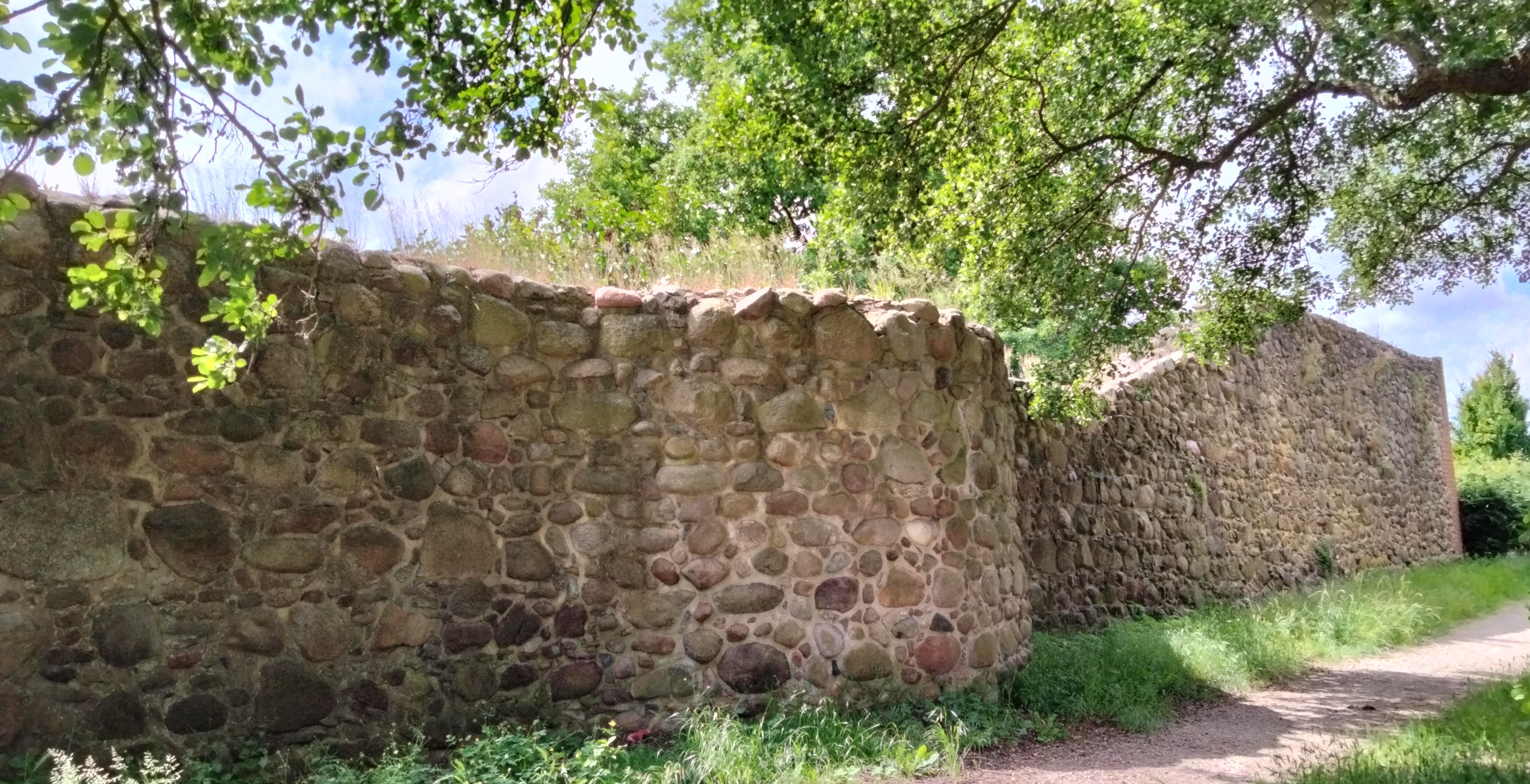
Medieval city wall

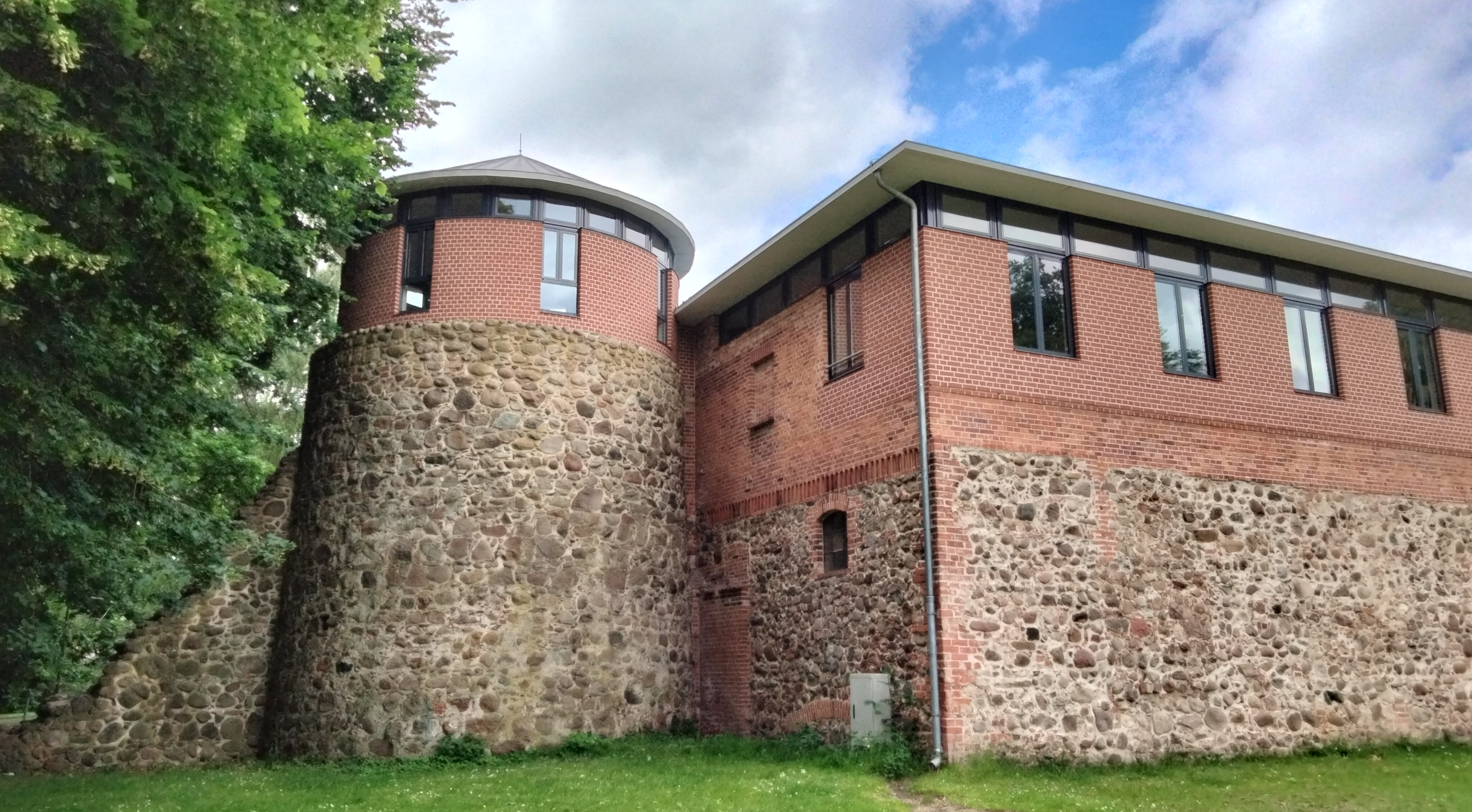
Former shot tower of the medieval city wall

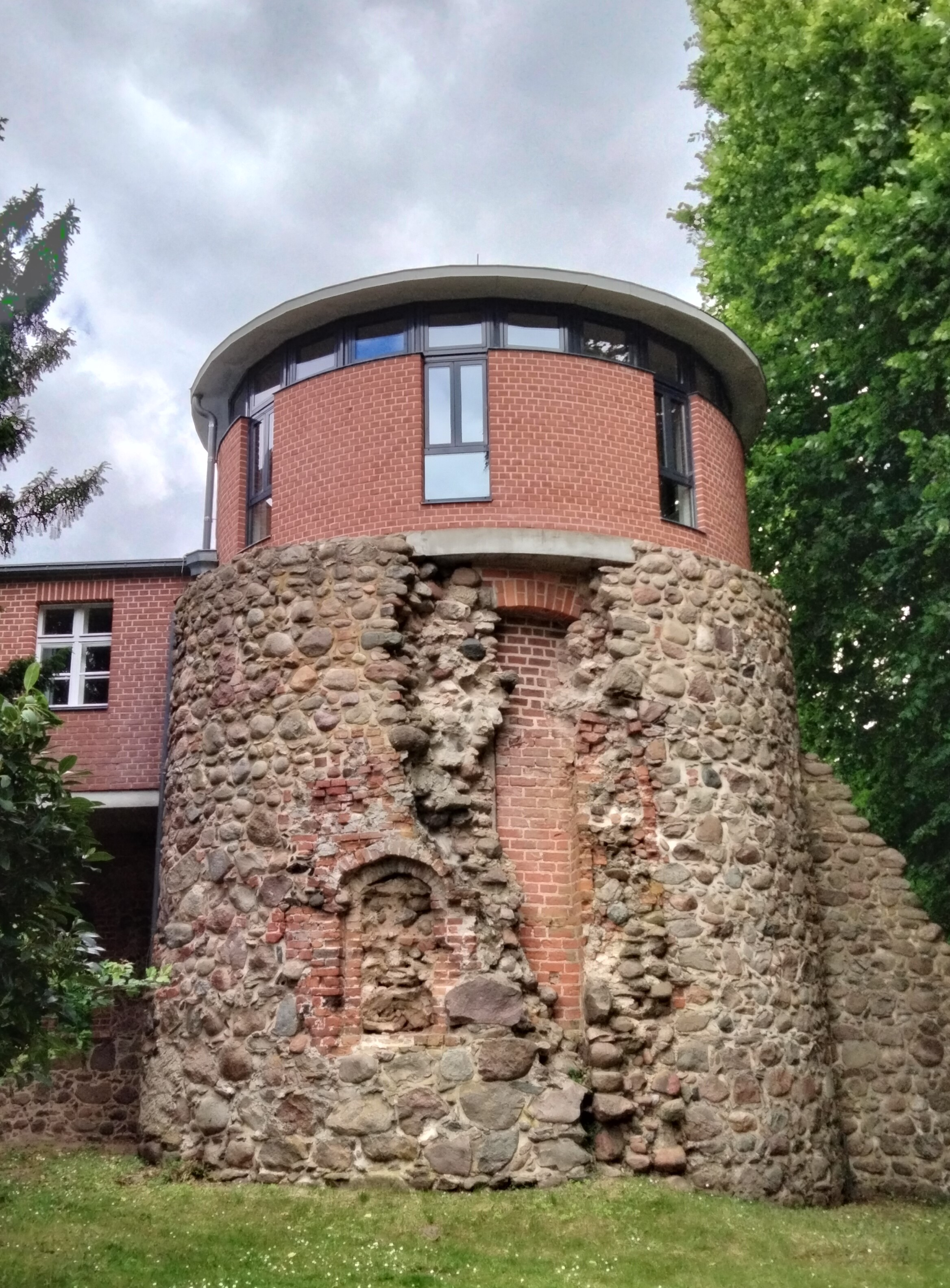
Former shot tower of the medieval city wall

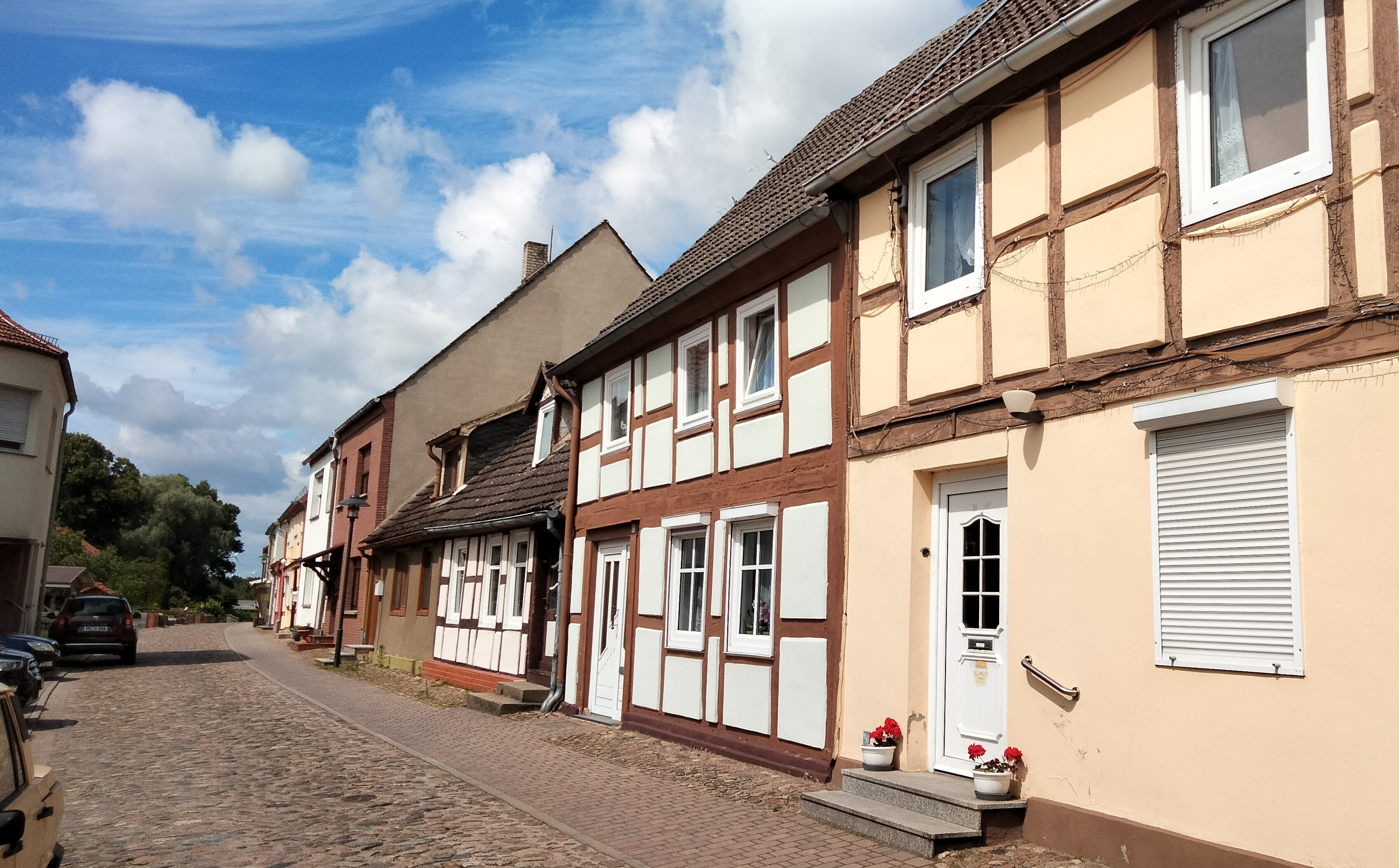
Half-timbered houses in Wallstrasse

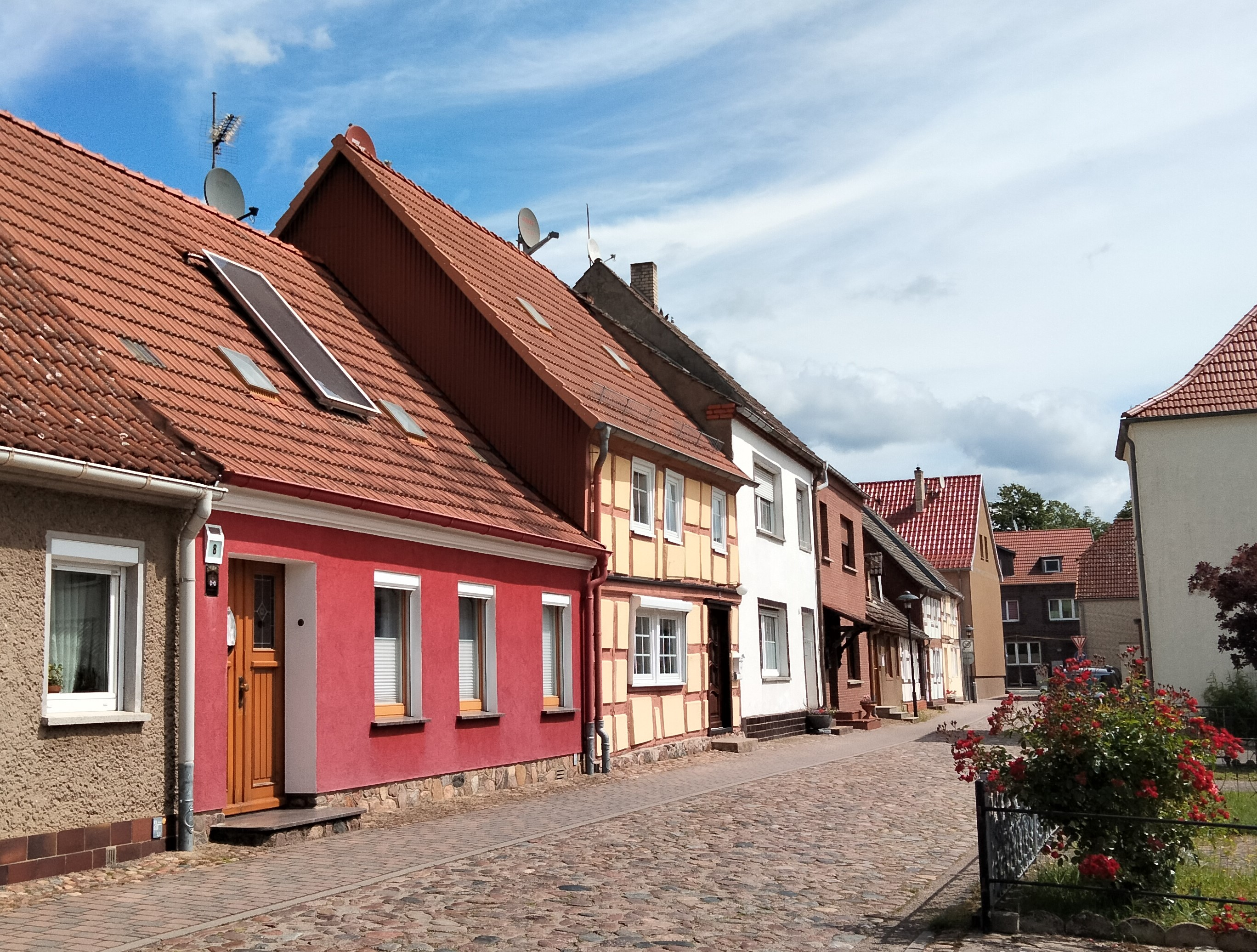
Half-timbered houses in Wallstrasse

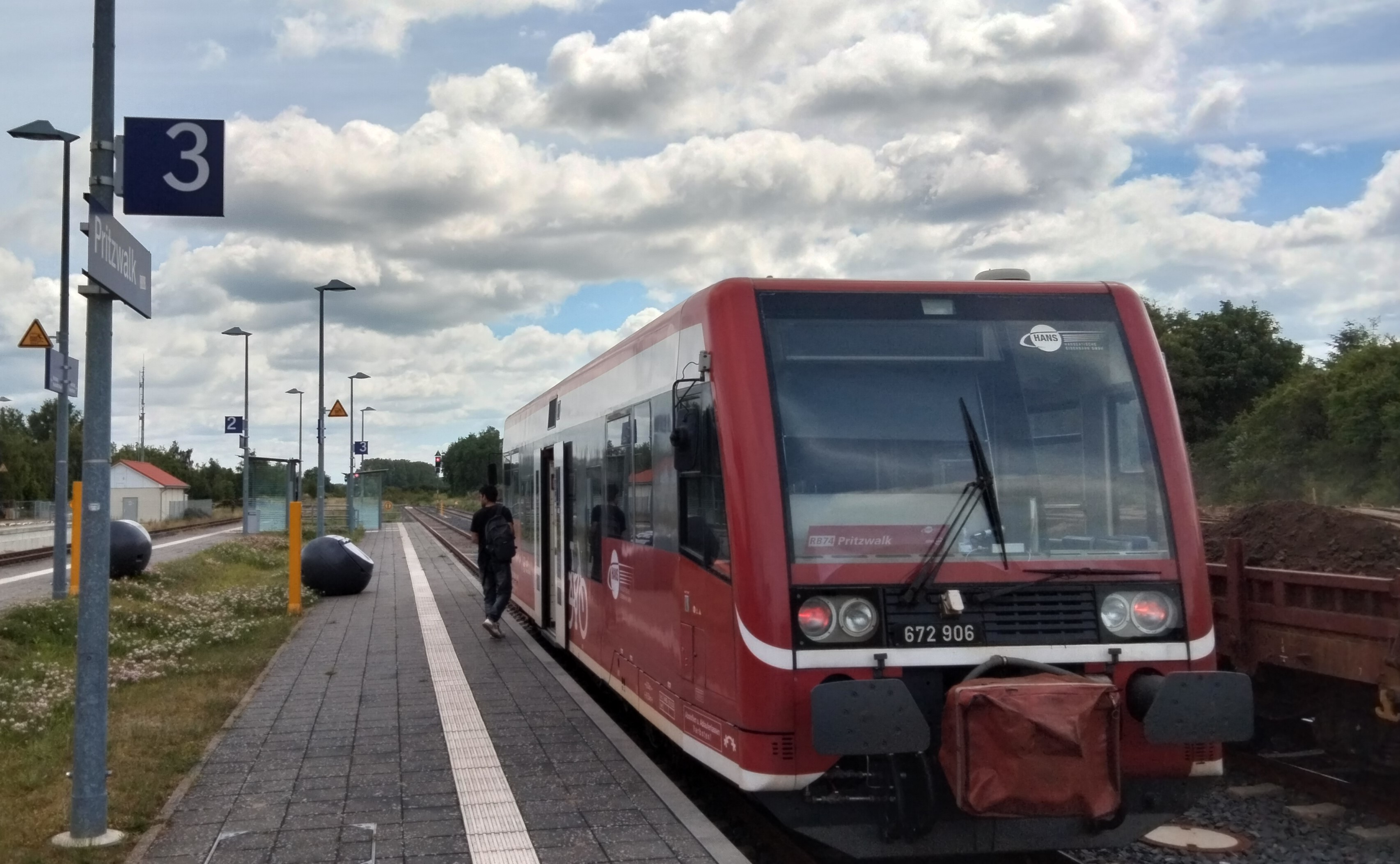
Train from Meyenburg to Pritzwalk
