= Barneberg =

- Ortsteil of Hötensleben
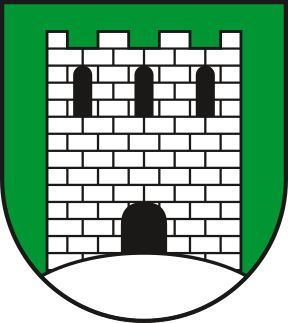
- Coat of arms
- Interactive map of Barneberg
- Location within Germany Location within Saxony-Anhalt
- Coordinates: 52°7′N 11°4′E
- Country: Germany
- State: Saxony-Anhalt
- District: Börde
- Municipality: Hötensleben

Area
  - Total: 8.80 km^{2} (3.40 sq mi)
- Elevation: 150 m (490 ft)

Population (2006-12-31)
  - Total: 759
  - Density: 86.3/km^{2} (223/sq mi)
- Time zone: UTC+01:00 (CET)
  - Summer (DST): UTC+02:00 (CEST)
- Postal codes: 39393
- Dialling codes: 039402
- Vehicle registration: BK

Barneberg is a village and a former municipality in the Börde district in Saxony-Anhalt, Germany. Since 1 January 2010, it is part of the municipality Hötensleben.

== Notable persons ==
Fritz Burchardt, a German-British economist was born in Barneburg in 1902.
