= St. Thomas Church, Berlin =

Protestant church in Berlin-Kreuzberg, Germany

Coordinates: 52°30′19″N 13°25′36″E

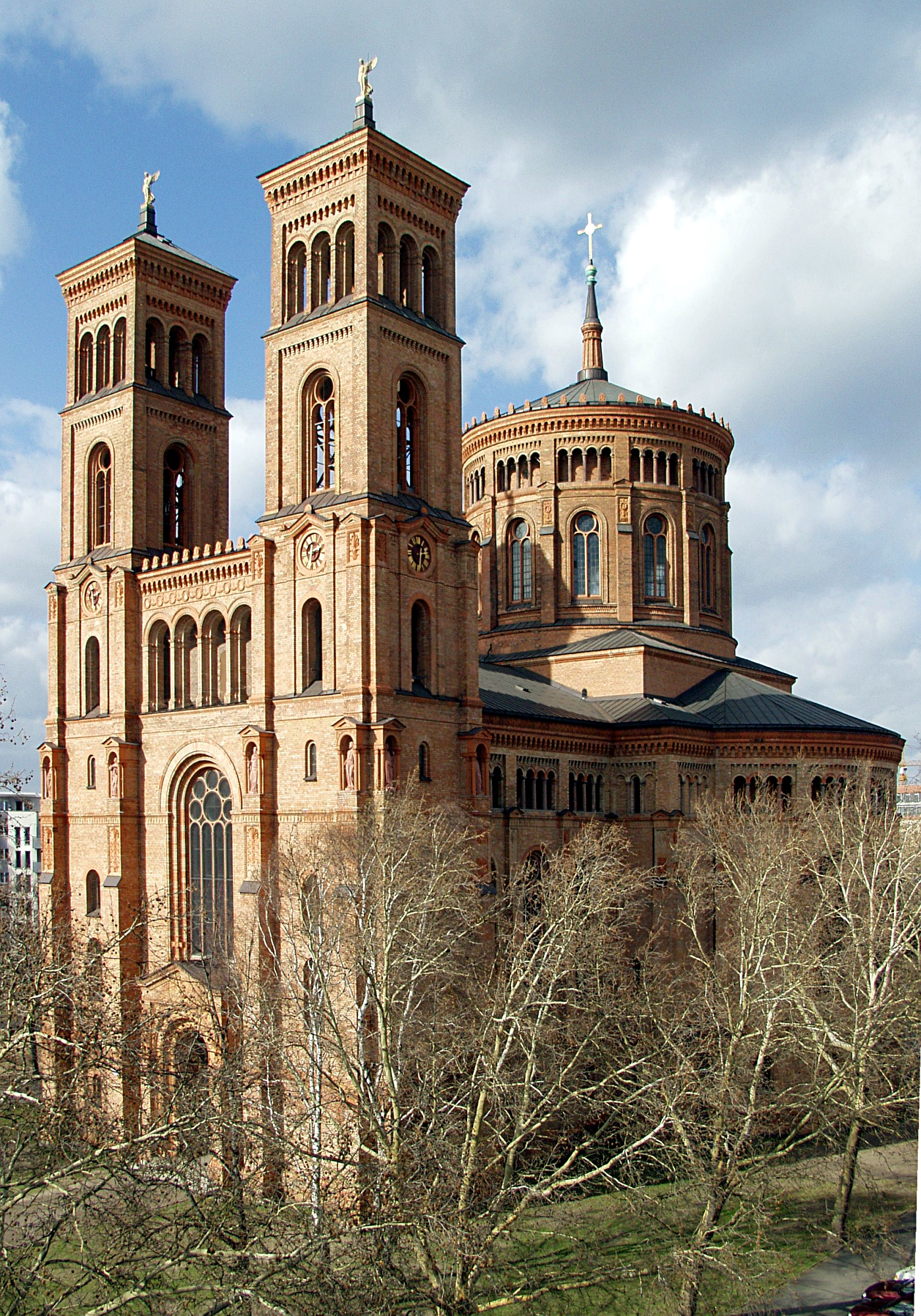
Photograph of Saint Thomas Church

The church St. Thomas (German: Thomaskirche) is a Protestant church in the Kreuzberg district of Berlin. Friedrich Adler designed and built the church between 1865 and 1869. The church was constructed in the shape of a Latin cross with two towers and a 56 metre high dome.

Prior to the construction of the Berliner Dom, it was the largest church in Berlin with around 3,000 seats, and the congregation was one of the largest in Western Christendom.

St. Thomas was partially damaged by an aerial bombardment on 22 November 1942. The church’s eastern gallery and choir windows were completely destroyed. The reconstruction occurred between 1956 and 1963 by Werner Retzlaffand Ludolf von Walthausen. The exterior of the church was reconstructed according to historical templates, while the interior underwent several changes.

It is located directly between the Luisenstädtischer Kanal and Mariannenplatz, once a central location.
