= Gustav Kaupert =

German sculptor

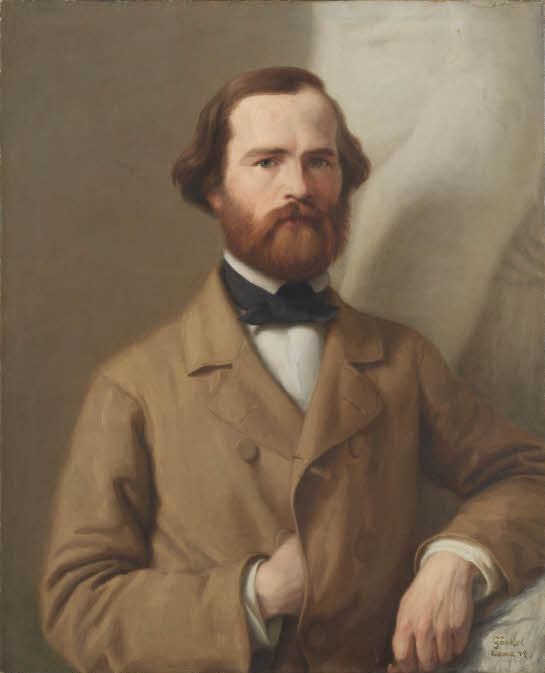
Portrait of Gustav Kaupert by Friedrich Gunkel

Gustav Kaupert (April 4, 1819 – December 4, 1897) was a German sculptor born in Kassel. He was the brother of topographer Johann August Kaupert (1822–1899).

Kaupert was an instructor from 1867 to 1892 at the Städelsches Institut in Frankfurt am Main. His works were largely of an allegorical or mythological nature. Using Carrara marble, he sculpted a monument of Kaiser Wilhelm I, being unveiled in March 1892 at the Imperial Hall of the Römer building in Frankfurt. Another acclaimed work of his were figures of Christ and the Evangelists, located at the Basilica in Trier.

In the United States, his creations can be found in Richmond, Virginia (monument of George Washington), and in Washington DC (figure of "America" at the Capitol building).

He died in Kassel on December 4, 1897.
