= Hötensleben =

- Municipality
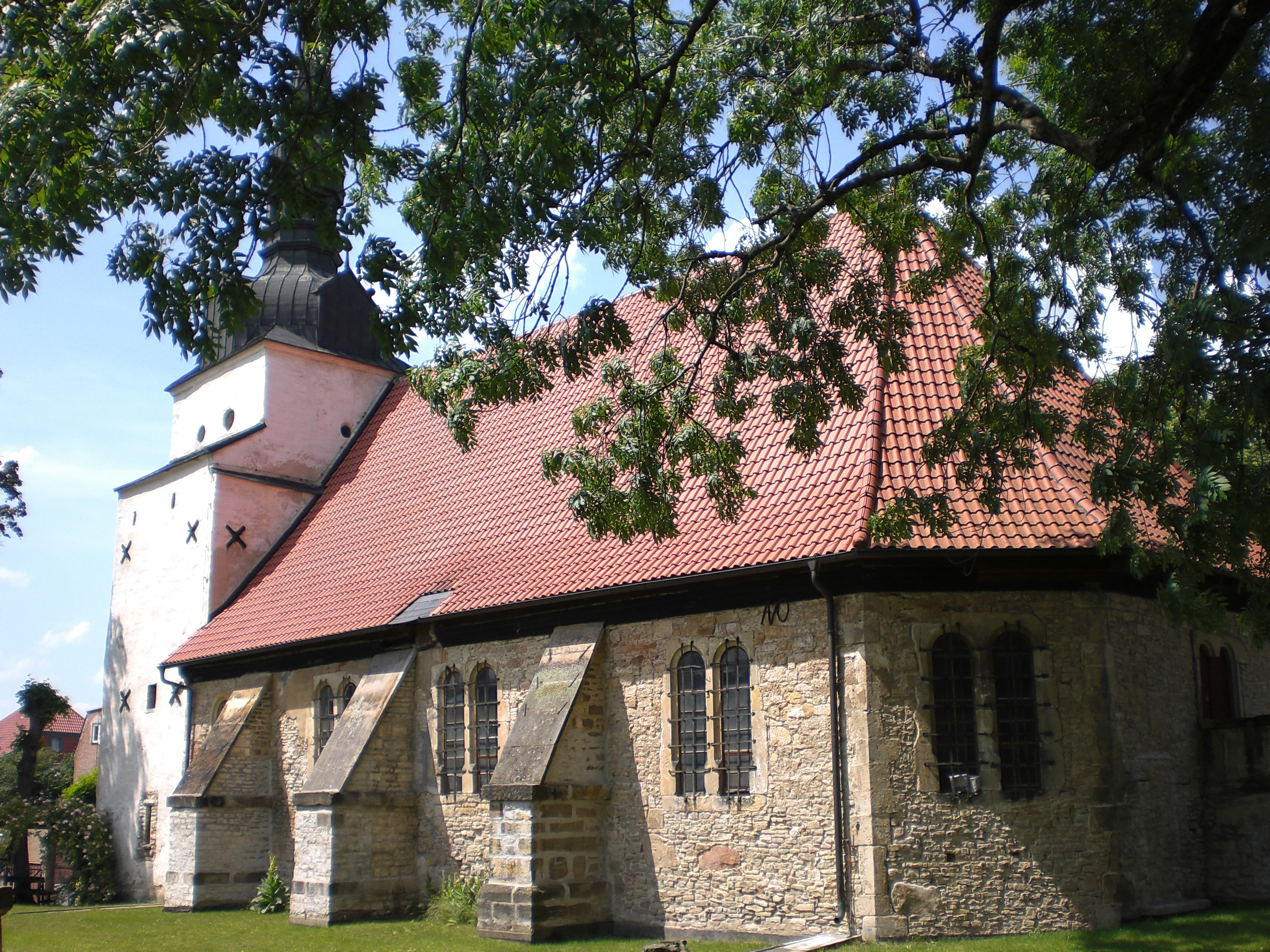
- Church of Saint Bartholomew

- Coat of arms

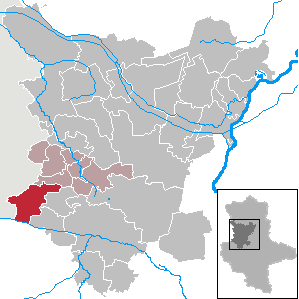
- Location of Hötensleben within Börde district
- Interactive map of Hötensleben
- Location within Germany Location within Saxony-Anhalt
- Coordinates: 52°07′N 11°1′E
- Country: Germany
- State: Saxony-Anhalt
- District: Börde
- Municipal assoc.: Obere Aller

Government
  - Mayor (2022–29): Stephan Löffler

Area
  - Total: 60.75 km^{2} (23.46 sq mi)
- Elevation: 99 m (325 ft)

Population (2025-12-31)
  - Total: 3,329
  - Density: 54.80/km^{2} (141.9/sq mi)
- Time zone: UTC+01:00 (CET)
  - Summer (DST): UTC+02:00 (CEST)
- Postal codes: 39393
- Dialling codes: 039401, 039402, 039405
- Vehicle registration: BK

Hötensleben is a municipality in the Börde district in Saxony-Anhalt, Germany.

== History ==
The first documented evidence of Hötensleben goes back to 983 AD, when the abbey as a part of the city under the name Holeinaslofu or Hokinasluvu was mentioned. The history goes back to the 16th century, but the handwritten documents of the time may not be called reliable.

On 10 January 1016, there is clear documentary evidence of the town. Throughout history, the lords of the town and castle were often changed under ecclesiastical and secular rulers of the day.

On 1 January 2005, it absorbed the former municipality Ohrsleben, followed by the former municipalities Barneberg and Wackersleben in January 2010.

== Politics ==
Stephan Löffler was elected mayor in April 2022.
